= List of Irish politicians who changed party affiliation =

This is a list of members of Dáil Éireann, Seanad Éireann and Irish Members of the European Parliament who changed their party affiliation (that is abandoning a previous party membership to take up a new one) or who resigned from, were suspended from or were expelled from their previous party affiliation, making them independents. This list does not include the Ceann Comhairle, who resigns from their previous party affiliation on election to the position.

== TDs who changed party affiliation ==
| Dáil | Date | TD | Loss | Gain | Constituency | Reason |
|---|---|---|---|---|---|---|
| 4th | 21 June 1924 | Osmond Esmonde | CnaG | NG | Wexford | Joined party |
| 4th | March 1925 | Osmond Esmonde | NG | Ind. | Wexford | Party dissolution |
| 4th | 25 January 1926 | William Magennis | CnaG | CÉ | National University | Joined party on its foundation |
| 4th | 25 January 1926 | Pádraic Ó Máille | CnaG | CÉ | Galway | Joined party on its foundation |
| 4th | 25 January 1926 | Christoper Byrne | CnaG | CÉ | Wicklow | Joined party on its foundation |
| 4th | 16 May 1926 | | SF | FF | | Split in Sinn Féin, with majority of TDs joining new party led by Éamon de Valera |
| 4th | September 1926 | William Redmond | Ind. | NL | Waterford | Joined party on its foundation as leader |
| 4th | September 1926 | James Cosgrave | Ind. | NL | Galway | Joined party on its foundation |
| 4th | May 1927 | Denis Gorey | FP | CnaG | Carlow–Kilkenny | Selected as candidate for Cumann na nGaedheal |
| 5th | 26 July 1927 | Patrick Belton | FF | Ind. | Dublin County | Took Oath of Allegiance in contravention of Fianna Fáil policy |
| 4th | 1927 | Osmond Esmonde | Ind. | CnaG | Wexford | Rejoined party |
| 6th | July 1931 | William Redmond | NL | CnaG | Waterford | Party dissolution |
| 6th | July 1931 | James Coburn | NL | Ind. | Louth | Party dissolution |
| 6th | 24 October 1931 | Richard Anthony | Lab | Ind. | Cork Borough | Expelled for voting for Constitution (Amendment No. 17) Act 1931 |
| 6th | 24 October 1931 | Daniel Morrissey | Lab | Ind. | Tipperary | Expelled for voting for Constitution (Amendment No. 17) Act 1931 |
| 6th | 1932 | Michael Heffernan | FP | CnaG | Tipperary | Selected to run for Cumann na nGaedheal for forthcoming election |
| 6th | 1932 | Michael Jordan | FP | CnaG | Wexford | Selected to run for Cumann na nGaedheal for forthcoming election |
| 6th | 1932 | John White | FP | CnaG | Donegal | Selected to run for Cumann na nGaedheal for forthcoming election |
| 7th | 15 September 1932 | James Dillon | Ind. | NCP | Donegal | Joined new party on foundation |
| 7th | 15 September 1932 | Frank MacDermot | Ind. | NCP | Roscommon | Joined new party on foundation |
| 7th | 15 September 1932 | Timothy O'Donovan | FP | NCP | Cork West | Joined new party on foundation |
| 7th | 15 September 1932 | John O'Shaughnessy | FP | NCP | Limerick | Joined new party on foundation |
| 7th | 15 September 1932 | Daniel Vaughan | FP | NCP | Cork North | Joined new party on foundation |
| 8th | 8 September 1933 | All 48 TDs | CnaG | FG | | New party formed on merger |
| 8th | 8 September 1933 | Richard Holohan | NCP | FG | Carlow–Kilkenny | Joined new party on merger |
| 8th | 8 September 1933 | Patrick McGovern | NCP | FG | Cavan | Joined new party on merger |
| 8th | 8 September 1933 | Timothy O'Donovan | NCP | FG | Cork West | Joined new party on merger |
| 8th | 8 September 1933 | James Dillon | NCP | FG | Donegal | Joined new party on merger |
| 8th | 8 September 1933 | Patrick Rogers | NCP | FG | Leitrim–Sligo | Joined new party on merger |
| 8th | 8 September 1933 | Jack Finlay | NCP | FG | Leix–Offaly | Joined new party on merger |
| 8th | 8 September 1933 | Charles Fagan | NCP | FG | Longford–Westmeath | Joined new party on merger |
| 8th | 8 September 1933 | Frank MacDermot | NCP | FG | Roscommon | Joined new party on merger |
| 8th | 8 September 1933 | Richard Curran | NCP | FG | Tipperary | Joined new party on merger |
| 8th | 8 September 1933 | Nicholas Wall | NCP | FG | Waterford | Joined new party on merger |
| 8th | 8 September 1933 | William Kent | NCP | Ind. | Cork East | Became Independent on formation of Fine Gael |
| 8th | October 1935 | Frank MacDermot | FG | Ind. | Roscommon | Resigned from party |
| 10th | 1942 | James Dillon | FG | Ind. | Monaghan | Left party in opposition to Irish neutrality |
| 11th | July 1943 | William Sheldon | CnaT | Ind. | Donegal East | Resigned from party |
| 11th | 7 January 1944 | James Everett | Lab | NLP | Wicklow | Joined party on its foundation as leader |
| 11th | 7 January 1944 | Thomas Looney | Lab | NLP | Cork South-East | Joined party on its foundation |
| 11th | 7 January 1944 | Dan Spring | Lab | NLP | Kerry North | Joined party on its foundation |
| 11th | 7 January 1944 | James Pattison | Lab | NLP | Kilkenny | Joined party on its foundation |
| 11th | 7 January 1944 | John O'Leary | Lab | NLP | Wexford | Joined party on its foundation |
| 13th | April 1951 | Noël Browne | CnaP | Ind. | Dublin South-East | Resigned from party |
| 14th | May 1952 | James Dillon | Ind. | FG | Monaghan | Rejoined party |
| 14th | 28 October 1953 | Noël Browne | Ind. | FF | Dublin South-East | Joined party |
| 14th | 28 October 1953 | Michael ffrench-O'Carroll | Ind. | FF | Dublin South-West | Joined party |
| 14th | 28 October 1953 | Patrick Cogan | Ind. | FF | Wicklow | Joined party |
| 16th | 16 May 1958 | Noël Browne | Ind. | NPD | Dublin South-East | Joined party on its foundation as co-leader |
| 16th | 16 May 1958 | Jack McQuillan | Ind. | NPD | Roscommon | Joined party on its foundation as co-leader |
| 17th | 27 October 1963 | Noël Browne | NPD | Lab | Dublin South-East | Party dissolution |
| 17th | 27 October 1963 | Jack McQuillan | NPD | Lab | Roscommon | Party dissolution |
| 17th | 27 October 1963 | Seán Dunne | Ind. | Lab | Dublin County | Joined party |
| 18th | 1 November 1967 | Patrick Norton | Lab | Ind. | Kildare | Resigned from party |
| 18th | 22 February 1969 | Patrick Norton | Ind. | FF | Kildare | Joined party |
| 19th | 19 September 1971 | Seán Sherwin | FF | AÉ | Dublin South-West | Joined party on its foundation |
| 19th | 5 November 1971 | Des Foley | FF | Ind. | Dublin County North | Resigned party |
| 19th | 17 November 1971 | Neil Blaney | FF | Ind. | Donegal North-East | Expelled from parliamentary party |
| 19th | 17 November 1971 | Paudge Brennan | FF | Ind. | Wicklow | Expelled from parliamentary party |
| 20th | 28 April 1976 | David Thornley | Lab | Ind. | Dublin North-West | Lost party whip after appearing on Sinn Féin platform during Easter Rising commemorations |
| 20th | 2 February 1977 | David Thornley | Ind. | Lab | Dublin North-West | Readmitted to parliamentary party |
| 23rd | 28 October 1982 | Michael O'Leary | Lab | Ind. | Dublin Central | Resigned as leader and party member |
| 23rd | 3 November 1982 | Michael O'Leary | Ind. | FG | Dublin Central | Joined Fine Gael |
| 24th | 18 May 1984 | Desmond O'Malley | Ind. | FF | Limerick East | Lost whip after support for New Ireland Forum Report |
| 24th | 18 February 1985 | John O'Connell | Ind. | FF | Dublin South-West | Joined party |
| 24th | 21 February 1985 | Seán Treacy | Lab | Ind. | Dublin South-West | Expelled after voting against Health (Family Planning) (Amendment) Bill 1985 |
| 24th | 27 November 1985 | Mary Harney | Ind. | FF | Dublin South-West | Lost whip after voting for the Anglo-Irish Agreement |
| 24th | 21 December 1985 | Desmond O'Malley | Ind. | PDs | Limerick East | Joined party on its foundation as leader |
| 24th | 21 December 1985 | Mary Harney | Ind. | PDs | Dublin South-West | Joined party on its foundation |
| 24th | 20 January 1986 | Pearse Wyse | FF | PDs | Cork South-Central | Joined party |
| 24th | 23 January 1986 | Bobby Molloy | FF | PDs | Galway West | Joined party |
| 24th | 9 April 1986 | Michael Keating | FG | PDs | Dublin Central | Joined party |
| 24th | 9 December 1986 | Alice Glenn | FG | Ind. | Dublin Central | Resigned ahead of motion to expel her in response to sectarian controversy |
| 25th | 20 April 1988 | John Donnellan | FG | Ind. | Galway West | Expelled from parliamentary party after criticising party leader |
| 26th | 1 May 1990 | Jim Kemmy | DSP | Lab | Limerick East | Party dissolution and merger |
| 26th | 22 February 1992 | Proinsias De Rossa | WP | DL | Dublin North-West | Formed new party as leader (initially called New Agenda) |
| 26th | 22 February 1992 | Eric Byrne | WP | DL | Dublin South-Central | Formed new party (initially called New Agenda) |
| 28th | 22 February 1992 | Eamon Gilmore | WP | DL | Dún Laoghaire | Formed new party (initially called New Agenda) |
| 26th | 22 February 1992 | Pat McCartan | WP | DL | Dublin North-East | Formed new party (initially called New Agenda) |
| 28th | 22 February 1992 | Pat Rabbitte | WP | DL | Dublin South-West | Formed new party (initially called New Agenda) |
| 28th | 22 February 1992 | Joe Sherlock | WP | DL | Cork West | Formed new party (initially called New Agenda) |
| 27th | 31 March 1993 | Michael J. Noonan | FF | Ind. | Limerick West | Loss of whip after criticism of party leader and Taoiseach |
| 27th | 5 September 1994 | Martin Cullen | PDs | FF | Waterford | Changed party |
| 27th | 18 January 1995 | Michael J. Noonan | Ind. | FF | Limerick West | Whip restored |
| 27th | 3 October 1995 | Michael J. Noonan | FF | Ind. | Limerick West | Loss of whip after abstaining on divorce amendment |
| 27th | 14 May 1997 | Michael J. Noonan | Ind. | FF | Limerick West | Whip restored |
| 28th | 13 October 1998 | Michael Bell | Lab | Ind. | Louth | Resigned from parliamentary party |
| 28th | 30 November 1998 | Michael Bell | Ind. | Lab | Louth | Rejoined the parliamentary party |
| 28th | 24 January 1999 | Proinsias De Rossa | DL | Lab | Dublin North-West | Party merger |
| 28th | 24 January 1999 | Pat Rabbitte | DL | Lab | Dublin South-West | Party merger |
| 28th | 24 January 1999 | Eamon Gilmore | DL | Lab | Dún Laoghaire | Party merger |
| 28th | 24 January 1999 | Liz McManus | DL | Lab | Wicklow | Party merger |
| 28th | 24 February 1999 | Beverley Flynn | FF | Ind. | Mayo | Resigned party whip |
| 28th | 3 November 1999 | Beverley Flynn | Ind. | FF | Mayo | Rejoined the parliamentary party |
| 28th | 9 February 2000 | Denis Foley | FF | Ind. | Kerry North | Resigned from parliamentary party |
| 28th | 7 June 2000 | Liam Lawlor | FF | Ind. | Dublin West | Resigned from party |
| 28th | 11 April 2001 | Beverley Flynn | FF | Ind. | Mayo | Expelled from parliamentary party |
| 29th | 27 September 2003 | Michael J. Collins | FF | Ind. | Limerick West | Resigned from party |
| 29th | 5 May 2004 | Beverley Flynn | FF | Ind. | Mayo | Expelled from parliamentary party |
| 29th | 22 September 2004 | Liam Twomey | Ind. | FG | Wexford | Joined party |
| 29th | 26 July 2006 | Niall Blaney | IFF | FF | Donegal North-East | Joined party |
| 30th | 28 November 2007 | Ned O'Keeffe | FF | Ind. | Cork East | Resigned from parliamentary party |
| 30th | 27 February 2008 | Ned O'Keeffe | Ind. | FF | Cork East | Rejoined the parliamentary party |
| 30th | 8 April 2008 | Beverley Flynn | Ind. | FF | Mayo | Rejoined the party |
| 30th | 17 October 2008 | Joe Behan | FF | Ind. | Wicklow | Resigned from party |
| 30th | 13 November 2008 | Jim McDaid | FF | Ind. | Donegal North-East | Lost party whip after abstaining in a vote on a health issue |
| 30th | 5 August 2009 | Jimmy Devins | FF | Ind. | Sligo–North Leitrim | Resigned party whip in protest at cuts in cancer services at Sligo General Hospital |
| 30th | 5 August 2009 | Eamon Scanlon | FF | Ind. | Sligo–North Leitrim | Resigned party whip in protest at cuts in cancer services at Sligo General Hospital |
| 30th | 20 November 2009 | Noel Grealish | PDs | Ind. | Galway West | Party dissolution |
| 30th | 20 November 2009 | Mary Harney | PDs | Ind. | Dublin Mid-West | Party dissolution |
| 30th | 29 June 2010 | Mattie McGrath | FF | Ind. | Tipperary South | Lost party whip after voting against a bill to ban stag hunting |
| 30th | 13 January 2011 | Eamon Scanlon | Ind. | FF | Sligo–North Leitrim | Rejoined the parliamentary party |
| 30th | 25 January 2011 | Jimmy Devins | Ind. | FF | Sligo–North Leitrim | Rejoined the parliamentary party |
| 31st | 7 July 2011 | Denis Naughten | FG | Ind. | Roscommon–South Leitrim | Lost party whip for opposing closure of Roscommon County Hospital emergency department |
| 31st | 15 November 2011 | Willie Penrose | Lab | Ind. | Longford–Westmeath | Resigned party whip over the closure of an army barracks |
| 31st | 1 December 2011 | Tommy Broughan | Lab | Ind. | Dublin North-East | Lost party whip after voting against the Government on a vote relating to the Bank Guarantee Scheme |
| 31st | 6 December 2011 | Patrick Nulty | Lab | Ind. | Dublin West | Lost party whip after voting against the VAT increase in the 2012 budget |
| 31st | 31 August 2012 | Clare Daly | SP | Ind. | Dublin North | Resigned from party |
| 31st | 26 September 2012 | Róisín Shortall | Lab | Ind. | Dublin North-West | Resigned party whip and as Minister of State at the Department of Health |
| 31st | 13 December 2012 | Colm Keaveney | Lab | Ind. | Galway East | Lost party whip after voting against part of the 2013 budget |
| 31st | 25 April 2013 | Joan Collins | PBP | Ind. | Dublin South-Central | Left the People Before Profit Alliance and formed the United Left but remained an independent TD |
| 31st | 2 July 2013 | Peter Mathews | FG | Ind. | Dublin South | Lost party whip for voting against the Protection of Life During Pregnancy Bill 2013 |
| 31st | 2 July 2013 | Billy Timmins | FG | Ind. | Wicklow | Lost party whip for voting against the Protection of Life During Pregnancy Bill 2013 |
| 31st | 2 July 2013 | Brian Walsh | FG | Ind. | Galway West | Lost party whip for voting against the Protection of Life During Pregnancy Bill 2013 |
| 31st | 2 July 2013 | Terence Flanagan | FG | Ind. | Dublin North-East | Lost party whip for voting against the Protection of Life During Pregnancy Bill 2013 |
| 31st | 11 July 2013 | Lucinda Creighton | FG | Ind. | Dublin South-East | Lost party whip for voting against the Protection of Life During Pregnancy Bill 2013 and resigned as Minister of State for European Affairs |
| 31st | 12 July 2013 | Peadar Tóibín | SF | Ind. | Meath West | Suspended from parliamentary party for voting against the Protection of Life During Pregnancy Bill 2013 |
| 31st | 7 October 2013 | Willie Penrose | Ind. | Lab | Longford–Westmeath | Rejoined the parliamentary party |
| 31st | 3 December 2013 | Colm Keaveney | Ind. | FF | Galway East | Joined Fianna Fáil |
| 31st | 12 January 2014 | Peadar Tóibín | Ind. | SF | Meath West | Rejoined the parliamentary party after a six-month suspension for voting against the Protection of Life During Pregnancy Bill 2013 |
| 31st | 30 April 2014 | Brian Walsh | Ind. | FG | Galway West | Rejoined the parliamentary party |
| 31st | 10 February 2015 | Anne Ferris | Lab | Ind. | Wicklow | Lost party whip for voting in favour of providing for abortion in cases of fatal foetal abnormalities |
| 31st | 13 March 2015 | Lucinda Creighton | Ind. | Ren | Dublin South-East | Joined party on its foundation as leader |
| 31st | 13 March 2015 | Billy Timmins | Ind. | Ren | Wicklow | Joined party on its foundation |
| 31st | 13 March 2015 | Terence Flanagan | Ind. | Ren | Dublin North-East | Joined party on its foundation |
| 31st | 29 May 2015 | Michael McNamara | Lab | Ind. | Clare | Lost party whip for voting against the sale of the state's stake in Aer Lingus |
| 31st | 15 July 2015 | Stephen Donnelly | Ind. | SD | Wicklow | Joined party on its foundation as co-leader |
| 31st | 15 July 2015 | Catherine Murphy | Ind. | SD | Kildare North | Joined party on its foundation as co-leader |
| 31st | 15 July 2015 | Róisín Shortall | Ind. | SD | Dublin North-West | Joined party on its foundation as co-leader |
| 31st | 16 July 2015 | Anne Ferris | Ind. | Lab | Wicklow | Rejoined the parliamentary party |
| 31st | 16 September 2015 | Michael McNamara | Ind. | Lab | Clare | Rejoined the parliamentary party |
| 31st | 26 September 2015 | Eamonn Maloney | Lab | Ind. | Dublin South-West | Resigned from party |
| 31st | 24 November 2015 | Seán Conlan | FG | Ind. | Cavan–Monaghan | Resigned from party |
| 32nd | 26 July 2016 | Tommy Broughan | I4C | Ind. | Dublin Bay North | Left party |
| 32nd | 5 September 2016 | Stephen Donnelly | SD | Ind. | Wicklow | Left party |
| 32nd | 2 February 2017 | Stephen Donnelly | Ind. | FF | Wicklow | Joined party |
| 32nd | 22 March 2018 | Carol Nolan | SF | Ind. | Offaly | Suspended for voting against the bill on repealing the Eight Amendment before it was put to a referendum. She resigned from Sinn Féin in June 2018. |
| 32nd | 2 October 2018 | Peter Fitzpatrick | FG | Ind. | Louth | Resigned from party |
| 32nd | 15 November 2018 | Peadar Tóibín | SF | Ind. | Meath West | Resigned from party |
| 32nd | 28 January 2019 | Peadar Tóibín | Ind. | Aon | Meath West | Joined party on its foundation as leader |
| 33rd | 31 May 2020 | Joan Collins | I4C | RTC | Dublin South-Central | Joined party on its foundation as leader |
| 33rd | 15 September 2021 | Marc MacSharry | FF | Ind. | Sligo–Leitrim | Resigned party whip to vote no confidence in Minister for Foreign Affairs Simon Coveney. He left the party in November 2022. |
| 33rd | 25 February 2022 | Violet-Anne Wynne | SF | Ind. | Clare | Resigned from party |
| 33rd | 19 May 2022 | Patrick Costello | GP | Ind. | Dublin South-Central | Suspended after breaking whip on motion on ownership of the National Maternity Hospital, Dublin |
| 33rd | 19 May 2022 | Neasa Hourigan | GP | Ind. | Dublin Central | Suspended after breaking whip on motion on ownership of the National Maternity Hospital |
| 33rd | 6 July 2022 | Joe McHugh | FG | Ind. | Donegal | Resigned whip to vote against Remediation of Dwellings Damaged By the Use of Defective Concrete Blocks Bill 2022 |
| 33rd | 23 November 2022 | Patrick Costello | Ind. | GP | Dublin South-Central | Regained party whip |
| 33rd | 23 November 2022 | Neasa Hourigan | Ind. | GP | Dublin Central | Regained party whip |
| 33rd | 23 March 2023 | Neasa Hourigan | GP | Ind. | Dublin Central | Suspended after voting against government on eviction ban |
| 33rd | 10 November 2023 | Michael Collins | Ind. | II | Cork South-West | Joined party on its foundation as leader |
| 33rd | 10 November 2023 | Richard O'Donoghue | Ind. | II | Limerick County | Joined party on its foundation as General Secretary |
| 33rd | 12 February 2024 | Michael Fitzmaurice | Ind. | II | Roscommon–Galway | Joined party |
| 33rd | July 2024 | Neasa Hourigan | Ind. | GP | Dublin Central | Regained party whip |
| 33rd | 9 October 2024 | Patricia Ryan | SF | Ind. | Kildare South | Resigned from party |
| 34th | 10 December 2024 | Eoin Hayes | SD | Ind. | Dublin Bay South | Suspended from party |
| 34th | 25 July 2025 | Eoin Hayes | Ind. | SD | Dublin Bay South | Readmitted to party |

== Senators who changed party affiliation ==
| Seanad | Date | Senator | Loss | Gain | Panel | Reason |
|---|---|---|---|---|---|---|
| 21st | 14 January 1999 | Brendan Ryan | Ind. | Lab | National University | Took Labour whip |
| 21st | 14 June 2000 | Helen Keogh | PDs | FG | Nominated by the Taoiseach | Switched party |
| 22nd | 29 April 2004 | Michael Brennan | FF | PDs | Nominated by the Taoiseach | Resigned from party |
| 22nd | 28 March 2007 | Liam Fitzgerald | FF | Ind. | Labour Panel | Resigned from party |
| 22nd | 4 April 2007 | Margaret Cox | FF | Ind. | Industrial and Commercial Panel | Resigned from party |
| 24th | 7 February 2012 | Eamonn Coghlan | Ind. | FG | Nominated by the Taoiseach | Joined Fine Gael |
| 24th | 21 December 2012 | James Heffernan | Lab | Ind. | Agricultural Panel | Lost the parliamentary Labour Party whip |
| 24th | 16 July 2013 | Fidelma Healy Eames | FG | Ind. | Labour Panel | Lost the party whip for voting against the Protection of Life During Pregnancy Bill 2013 |
| 24th | 16 July 2013 | Paul Bradford | FG | Ind. | Agricultural Panel | Lost the party whip for voting against the Protection of Life During Pregnancy Bill 2013 |
| 24th | 21 December 2014 | Mark Daly | FF | Ind. | Administrative Panel | Lost the party whip on Water Services Bill |
| 24th | 3 February 2015 | Mark Daly | Ind. | FF | Administrative Panel | Re-gained party whip |
| 24th | 13 March 2015 | Paul Bradford | Ind. | Ren | Agricultural Panel | Joined Renua on its foundation |
| 24th | 26 March 2015 | Jim Walsh | FF | Ind. | Agricultural Panel | Resigned party whip in opposition to the Children and Family Relationships Bill 2015 and the Thirty-fourth Amendment of the Constitution (Marriage Equality) Bill 2015 |
| 24th | 25 May 2015 | Averil Power | FF | Ind. | Industrial and Commercial Panel | Resigned from party |
| 24th | 3 September 2015 | James Heffernan | Ind. | SD | Agricultural Panel | Joined the Social Democrats |
| 25th | 30 November 2017 | Trevor Ó Clochartaigh | SF | Ind. | Agricultural Panel | Resigned from party |
| 26th | 4 November 2024 | Eugene Murphy | FF | Ind. | Agricultural Panel | Resigned from Fianna Fáil to contest the 2024 general election as an independent. |
| 27th | 9 February 2025 | Martin Conway | FG | Ind. | Administrative Panel | Resigned from Fine Gael |

== MEPs who changed party affiliation ==
| Date | Parl. | MEP | Loss | Gain | Constituency | Note |
|---|---|---|---|---|---|---|
| 22 February 1992 | 3rd | Des Geraghty | Workers' Party | Democratic Left | Dublin | Joined new party (initially called New Agenda) |
| 5 April 2013 | 7th | Nessa Childers | Labour | Independent | East | Resigned from parliamentary party |
| 24 June 2014 | 8th | Brian Crowley | Fianna Fáil | Independent | South | Loss of whip on joining European Conservatives and Reformists |

== See also ==
- Party switching
- List of Dáil by-elections
- List of Seanad by-elections
- List of ministerial resignations and terminations of appointment in the Republic of Ireland
