= 33rd Dáil =

Irish parliament lower house, 2020–2024

←	32nd Dáil	34th Dáil	→

Overview
- Legislative body: Dáil Éireann
- Jurisdiction: Ireland
- Meeting place: Leinster House
- Term: 20 February 2020 – 8 November 2024
- Election: 2020 general election
- Government: 32nd government of Ireland (2020–2022); 33rd government of Ireland (2022–2024); 34th government of Ireland (2024–2025)
- Members: 160
- Ceann Comhairle: Seán Ó Fearghaíl
- Leas-Cheann Comhairle: Catherine Connolly
- Taoiseach: Simon Harris — Leo Varadkar; 17 December 2022 to 9 April 2024 — Micheál Martin; 27 June 2020 to 17 December 2022
- Tánaiste: Micheál Martin — Leo Varadkar until 17 December 2022
- Chief Whip: Hildegarde Naughton
- Leader of the Opposition: Mary Lou McDonald

Sessions
- 1st: 20 February 2020 – 30 July 2020
- 2nd: 2 September 2020 – 15 July 2021
- 3rd: 15 September 2021 – 14 July 2022
- 4th: 14 September 2022 – 13 July 2023
- 5th: 20 September 2023 – 11 July 2024
- 6th: 18 September 2024 – 7 November 2024

The 33rd Dáil was elected at the 2020 general election on 8 February 2020 and first met on 20 February 2020. The members of Dáil Éireann, the house of representatives of the Oireachtas (legislature) of Ireland, are known as TDs. It sat with the 26th Seanad as the Houses of the Oireachtas. There were 160 TDs in the 33rd Dáil, an increase of 2.

The 33rd Dáil was dissolved by President Michael D. Higgins on 8 November 2024, at the request of the Taoiseach Simon Harris. It lasted 4 years, 262 days.

== Composition of the 33rd Dáil ==
- 32nd, 33rd, 34th government coalition parties

Party	Feb. 2020	Nov. 2024	Change
Fianna Fáil	38	35	▼3
Sinn Féin	37	33	▼4
Fine Gael	35	32	▼3
Green	12	12	Steady
Labour	6	6	Steady
Social Democrats	6	6	Steady
PBP–Solidarity (Note: Known as Solidarity–People Before Profit until December 2020.)	5	5	Steady
Aontú	1	1	Steady
Inds. 4 Change	1	0	▼1
Independent Ireland	—N/a	3	▲3
Right to Change	—N/a	1	▲1
Independent	19	20	▲1
Ceann Comhairle	—N/a	1	▲1
Vacant	—N/a	5	▲5
Total	160		

Notes

Members of Dáil Éireann after the 2020 general election.

== Ceann Comhairle ==
- Ceann Comhairle: Seán Ó Fearghaíl (Fianna Fáil)
- Leas-Cheann Comhairle: Catherine Connolly (Independent)

The Ceann Comhairle is automatically returned unless they state their intention to retire before the Dáil is dissolved. The outgoing Ceann Comhairle, Seán Ó Fearghaíl, did not retire. The first order of business of the new Dáil was to elect a new Ceann Comhairle. Ó Fearghaíl and Denis Naughten were both nominated, and Ó Fearghaíl was re-elected as Ceann Comhairle in a secret ballot.

On 23 July 2020, Catherine Connolly and Fergus O'Dowd were nominated for the position of Leas-Cheann Comhairle. Connolly was elected in a secret ballot.

== Political leadership ==
=== Government ===
- Taoiseach
  - Leo Varadkar (14 June 2017 to 27 June 2020)
  - Micheál Martin (27 June 2020 to 17 December 2022)
  - Leo Varadkar (17 December 2022 to 9 April 2024)
  - Simon Harris (9 April 2024 to date)
- Tánaiste
  - Simon Coveney (30 November 2017 to 27 June 2020)
  - Leo Varadkar (27 June 2020 to 17 December 2022)
  - Micheál Martin (17 December 2022 to date)
- Leader of Fine Gael
  - Leo Varadkar (2 June 2017 to 20 March 2024)
  - Simon Harris (20 March 2024 to date)
- Leader of Fianna Fáil
  - Micheál Martin (26 January 2011 to date)
- Leader of the Green Party
  - Eamon Ryan (27 May 2011 to 18 June 2024)
  - Roderic O'Gorman (18 June 2024 to date)

=== Opposition ===
- Leader of Sinn Féin
  - Mary Lou McDonald (10 February 2018 to date)
- Leader of the Labour Party
  - Brendan Howlin (20 May 2016 to 3 April 2020)
  - Alan Kelly (3 April 2020 to 24 March 2022)
  - Ivana Bacik (24 March 2022 to date)
- Leader of the Social Democrats
  - Róisín Shortall & Catherine Murphy (15 July 2015 to 1 March 2023)
  - Holly Cairns (1 March 2023 to date)
- Leader of Aontú
  - Peadar Tóibín (28 January 2019 to date; founding leader)
- Leader of Independent Ireland
  - Michael Collins (10 November 2023 to date; founding leader)

== List of TDs ==
Of the 160 TDs, forty-eight were elected for the first time. 36 are women (22.5%) and 124 are men.

+: Elected for the first time at the 2020 general election.
‡: Previously served as member of the Dáil non-consecutively to the current consecutive terms of office.
#: Member of the 25th Seanad at time of election.
§: Returned automatically without standing for election as outgoing Ceann Comhairle, in accordance with Article 16.6 of the Constitution of Ireland.

Constituency	Name	Portrait	Party affiliation (Technical group)		Assumed office
Constituency	Name	Portrait	Start of Dáil term	End of Dáil term	Assumed office
Carlow–Kilkenny	Kathleen Funchion		Sinn Féin	Elected to European Parliament in 2024	10 March 2016
Carlow–Kilkenny	John McGuinness		Fianna Fáil		26 June 1997
Carlow–Kilkenny	Jennifer Murnane O'Connor		Fianna Fáil		20 February 2020
Carlow–Kilkenny	Malcolm Noonan		Green Party		20 February 2020
Carlow–Kilkenny	John Paul Phelan		Fine Gael		9 March 2011
Cavan–Monaghan	Matt Carthy		Sinn Féin		20 February 2020
Cavan–Monaghan	Heather Humphreys		Fine Gael		9 March 2011
Cavan–Monaghan	Brendan Smith		Fianna Fáil		14 December 1992
Cavan–Monaghan	Niamh Smyth		Fianna Fáil		10 March 2016
Cavan–Monaghan	Pauline Tully		Sinn Féin		20 February 2020
Clare	Joe Carey		Fine Gael	Resigned in 2024	14 June 2007
Clare	Cathal Crowe		Fianna Fáil		20 February 2020
Clare	Michael McNamara		Independent (Independent Group)	Elected to European Parliament in 2024	20 February 2020
Clare	Violet-Anne Wynne		Sinn Féin	Independent	20 February 2020
Cork East	Pat Buckley		Sinn Féin		10 March 2016
Cork East	James O'Connor		Fianna Fáil		20 February 2020
Cork East	Seán Sherlock		Labour		14 June 2007
Cork East	David Stanton		Fine Gael		26 June 1997
Cork North-Central	Mick Barry		People Before Profit–Solidarity		10 March 2016
Cork North-Central	Colm Burke		Fine Gael		20 February 2020
Cork North-Central	Thomas Gould		Sinn Féin		20 February 2020
Cork North-Central	Pádraig O'Sullivan		Fianna Fáil		3 December 2019
Cork North-West	Michael Creed		Fine Gael		14 June 2007
Cork North-West	Aindrias Moynihan		Fianna Fáil		10 March 2016
Cork North-West	Michael Moynihan		Fianna Fáil		26 June 1997
Cork South-Central	Simon Coveney		Fine Gael		3 November 1998
Cork South-Central	Micheál Martin		Fianna Fáil		29 June 1989
Cork South-Central	Michael McGrath		Fianna Fáil		14 June 2007
Cork South-Central	Donnchadh Ó Laoghaire		Sinn Féin		10 March 2016
Cork South-West	Holly Cairns		Social Democrats		20 February 2020
Cork South-West	Michael Collins		Independent (Rural Group)	Independent Ireland	10 March 2016
Cork South-West	Christopher O'Sullivan		Fianna Fáil		20 February 2020
Donegal	Pearse Doherty		Sinn Féin		30 November 2010
Donegal	Pádraig Mac Lochlainn		Sinn Féin		20 February 2020
Donegal	Charlie McConalogue		Fianna Fáil		9 March 2011
Donegal	Joe McHugh		Fine Gael	Independent	14 June 2007
Donegal	Thomas Pringle		Independent (Independent Group)		9 March 2011
Dublin Bay North	Richard Bruton		Fine Gael		9 March 1982
Dublin Bay North	Seán Haughey		Fianna Fáil		10 March 2016
Dublin Bay North	Denise Mitchell		Sinn Féin		10 March 2016
Dublin Bay North	Cian O'Callaghan		Social Democrats		20 February 2020
Dublin Bay North	Aodhán Ó Ríordáin		Labour	Elected to European Parliament in 2024	20 February 2020
Dublin Bay South	Chris Andrews		Sinn Féin		20 February 2020
Dublin Bay South	Ivana Bacik		Elected in 2021 by-election	Labour	13 July 2021
Dublin Bay South	Eoghan Murphy		Fine Gael	Resigned in 2021	9 March 2011
Dublin Bay South	Jim O'Callaghan		Fianna Fáil		10 March 2016
Dublin Bay South	Eamon Ryan		Green Party		10 March 2016
Dublin Central	Paschal Donohoe		Fine Gael		9 March 2011
Dublin Central	Gary Gannon		Social Democrats		20 February 2020
Dublin Central	Neasa Hourigan		Green Party		20 February 2020
Dublin Central	Mary Lou McDonald		Sinn Féin		9 March 2011
Dublin Fingal	Alan Farrell		Fine Gael		9 March 2011
Dublin Fingal	Darragh O'Brien		Fianna Fáil		10 March 2016
Dublin Fingal	Joe O'Brien		Green Party		3 December 2019
Dublin Fingal	Louise O'Reilly		Sinn Féin		10 March 2016
Dublin Fingal	Duncan Smith		Labour		20 February 2020
Dublin Mid-West	Emer Higgins		Fine Gael		20 February 2020
Dublin Mid-West	Gino Kenny		People Before Profit–Solidarity		10 March 2016
Dublin Mid-West	Eoin Ó Broin		Sinn Féin		10 March 2016
Dublin Mid-West	Mark Ward		Sinn Féin		3 December 2019
Dublin North-West	Dessie Ellis		Sinn Féin		9 March 2011
Dublin North-West	Paul McAuliffe		Fianna Fáil		20 February 2020
Dublin North-West	Róisín Shortall		Social Democrats		14 December 1992
Dublin Rathdown	Josepha Madigan		Fine Gael		10 March 2016
Dublin Rathdown	Catherine Martin		Green Party		10 March 2016
Dublin Rathdown	Neale Richmond		Fine Gael		20 February 2020
Dublin South-Central	Joan Collins		Independents 4 Change (Independent Group)	Right to Change (Independent Group)	9 March 2011
Dublin South-Central	Patrick Costello		Green Party		20 February 2020
Dublin South-Central	Aengus Ó Snodaigh		Sinn Féin		6 June 2002
Dublin South-Central	Bríd Smith		People Before Profit–Solidarity		10 March 2016
Dublin South-West	Colm Brophy		Fine Gael		10 March 2016
Dublin South-West	Seán Crowe		Sinn Féin		9 March 2011
Dublin South-West	Francis Noel Duffy		Green Party		20 February 2020
Dublin South-West	John Lahart		Fianna Fáil		10 March 2016
Dublin South-West	Paul Murphy		People Before Profit–Solidarity		14 October 2014
Dublin West	Jack Chambers		Fianna Fáil		10 March 2016
Dublin West	Paul Donnelly		Sinn Féin		20 February 2020
Dublin West	Roderic O'Gorman		Green Party		20 February 2020
Dublin West	Leo Varadkar		Fine Gael		14 June 2007
Dún Laoghaire	Richard Boyd Barrett		People Before Profit–Solidarity		9 March 2011
Dún Laoghaire	Cormac Devlin		Fianna Fáil		20 February 2020
Dún Laoghaire	Jennifer Carroll MacNeill		Fine Gael		20 February 2020
Dún Laoghaire	Ossian Smyth		Green Party		20 February 2020
Galway East	Seán Canney		Independent (Regional Group)		10 March 2016
Galway East	Ciarán Cannon		Fine Gael		9 March 2011
Galway East	Anne Rabbitte		Fianna Fáil		10 March 2016
Galway West	Catherine Connolly		Independent (Independent Group)		10 March 2016
Galway West	Mairéad Farrell		Sinn Féin		20 February 2020
Galway West	Noel Grealish		Independent (Regional Group)		6 June 2002
Galway West	Hildegarde Naughton		Fine Gael		10 March 2016
Galway West	Éamon Ó Cuív		Fianna Fáil		14 December 1992
Kerry	Pa Daly		Sinn Féin		20 February 2020
Kerry	Norma Foley		Fianna Fáil		20 February 2020
Kerry	Brendan Griffin		Fine Gael		9 March 2011
Kerry	Danny Healy-Rae		Independent (Rural Group)		10 March 2016
Kerry	Michael Healy-Rae		Independent (Rural Group)		9 March 2011
Kildare North	Réada Cronin		Sinn Féin		20 February 2020
Kildare North	Bernard Durkan		Fine Gael		14 December 1982
Kildare North	James Lawless		Fianna Fáil		10 March 2016
Kildare North	Catherine Murphy		Social Democrats		9 March 2011
Kildare South	Cathal Berry		Independent (Regional Group)		20 February 2020
Kildare South	Martin Heydon		Fine Gael		9 March 2011
Kildare South	Seán Ó Fearghaíl		Fianna Fáil	Ceann Comhairle	6 June 2002
Kildare South	Patricia Ryan		Sinn Féin	Independent	20 February 2020
Laois–Offaly	Barry Cowen		Fianna Fáil	Elected to European Parliament in 2024	9 March 2011
Laois–Offaly	Charles Flanagan		Fine Gael		14 June 2007
Laois–Offaly	Seán Fleming		Fianna Fáil		26 June 1997
Laois–Offaly	Carol Nolan		Independent (Rural Group)		10 March 2016
Laois–Offaly	Brian Stanley		Sinn Féin	Independent	9 March 2011
Limerick City	Brian Leddin		Green Party		20 February 2020
Limerick City	Willie O'Dea		Fianna Fáil		9 March 1982
Limerick City	Kieran O'Donnell		Fine Gael		20 February 2020
Limerick City	Maurice Quinlivan		Sinn Féin		10 March 2016
Limerick County	Niall Collins		Fianna Fáil		14 June 2007
Limerick County	Richard O'Donoghue		Independent (Rural Group)	Independent Ireland	20 February 2020
Limerick County	Patrick O'Donovan		Fine Gael		9 March 2011
Longford–Westmeath	Peter Burke		Fine Gael		10 March 2016
Longford–Westmeath	Sorca Clarke		Sinn Féin		20 February 2020
Longford–Westmeath	Joe Flaherty		Fianna Fáil		20 February 2020
Longford–Westmeath	Robert Troy		Fianna Fáil		9 March 2011
Louth	Peter Fitzpatrick		Independent (Regional Group)		9 March 2011
Louth	Imelda Munster		Sinn Féin		10 March 2016
Louth	Ged Nash		Labour		20 February 2020
Louth	Fergus O'Dowd		Fine Gael		6 June 2002
Louth	Ruairí Ó Murchú		Sinn Féin		20 February 2020
Mayo	Dara Calleary		Fianna Fáil		14 June 2007
Mayo	Rose Conway-Walsh		Sinn Féin		20 February 2020
Mayo	Alan Dillon		Fine Gael		20 February 2020
Mayo	Michael Ring		Fine Gael		14 June 1994
Meath East	Thomas Byrne		Fianna Fáil		10 March 2016
Meath East	Helen McEntee		Fine Gael		16 April 2013
Meath East	Darren O'Rourke		Sinn Féin		20 February 2020
Meath West	Damien English		Fine Gael		6 June 2002
Meath West	Johnny Guirke		Sinn Féin		20 February 2020
Meath West	Peadar Tóibín		Aontú (Regional Group)		9 March 2011
Roscommon–Galway	Michael Fitzmaurice		Independent (Independent Group)	Independent Ireland	14 October 2014
Roscommon–Galway	Claire Kerrane		Sinn Féin		20 February 2020
Roscommon–Galway	Denis Naughten		Independent (Regional Group)		26 June 1997
Sligo–Leitrim	Frank Feighan		Fine Gael		20 February 2020
Sligo–Leitrim	Marian Harkin		Independent (Independent Group)		20 February 2020
Sligo–Leitrim	Martin Kenny		Sinn Féin		10 March 2016
Sligo–Leitrim	Marc MacSharry		Fianna Fáil	Independent	10 March 2016
Tipperary	Martin Browne		Sinn Féin		20 February 2020
Tipperary	Jackie Cahill		Fianna Fáil		10 March 2016
Tipperary	Alan Kelly		Labour		9 March 2011
Tipperary	Michael Lowry		Independent (Regional Group)		10 March 1987
Tipperary	Mattie McGrath		Independent (Rural Group)		14 June 2007
Waterford	Mary Butler		Fianna Fáil		10 March 2016
Waterford	David Cullinane		Sinn Féin		10 March 2016
Waterford	Marc Ó Cathasaigh		Green Party		20 February 2020
Waterford	Matt Shanahan		Independent (Regional Group)		20 February 2020
Wexford	James Browne		Fianna Fáil		10 March 2016
Wexford	Brendan Howlin		Labour		10 March 1987
Wexford	Paul Kehoe		Fine Gael		6 June 2002
Wexford	Verona Murphy		Independent (Regional Group)		20 February 2020
Wexford	Johnny Mythen		Sinn Féin		20 February 2020
Wicklow	John Brady		Sinn Féin		10 March 2016
Wicklow	Stephen Donnelly		Fianna Fáil		9 March 2011
Wicklow	Simon Harris		Fine Gael		9 March 2011
Wicklow	Steven Matthews		Green Party		20 February 2020
Wicklow	Jennifer Whitmore		Social Democrats		20 February 2020

== Technical groups ==
The Independents and some small parties formed three technical groups to facilitate Dáil speaking time.

=== Regional Group ===
Party	Name	Constituency
Independent (8)	Cathal Berry	Kildare South
Independent (8)	Seán Canney	Galway East
Independent (8)	Peter Fitzpatrick	Louth
Independent (8)	Noel Grealish	Galway West
Independent (8)	Michael Lowry	Tipperary
Independent (8)	Verona Murphy	Wexford
Independent (8)	Denis Naughten	Roscommon–Galway
Independent (8)	Matt Shanahan	Waterford
Aontú (1)	Peadar Tóibín	Meath West

=== Rural Group ===
Party	Name	Constituency
Independent (4)	Danny Healy-Rae	Kerry
Independent (4)	Michael Healy-Rae	Kerry
Independent (4)	Mattie McGrath	Tipperary
Independent (4)	Carol Nolan	Laois–Offaly
Independent Ireland (2)	Michael Collins	Cork South-West
Independent Ireland (2)	Richard O'Donoghue	Limerick County

=== Independent Group ===
Party	Name	Constituency
Independent (4)	Catherine Connolly	Galway West
Independent (4)	Marian Harkin	Sligo–Leitrim
Independent (4)	Michael McNamara	Clare
Independent (4)	Thomas Pringle	Donegal
Right to Change (1)	Joan Collins	Dublin South-Central
Independent Ireland (1)	Michael Fitzmaurice	Roscommon–Galway

== Changes ==
Date	Constituency	Loss	Gain	Note
20 February 2020	Kildare South	Fianna Fáil	Ceann Comhairle	Seán Ó Fearghaíl takes office as Ceann Comhairle
31 May 2020	Dublin South-Central	Inds. 4 Change	Right to Change	Joan Collins resigns from Independents 4 Change and founds Right to Change
27 April 2021	Dublin Bay South	Fine Gael		Eoghan Murphy resigns as a TD
9 July 2021	Dublin Bay South		Labour	Ivana Bacik gains seat left vacant by Murphy
15 September 2021	Sligo–Leitrim	Fianna Fáil	Independent	Marc MacSharry resigns the Fianna Fáil whip. He left the party in November 2022.
25 February 2022	Clare	Sinn Féin	Independent	Violet-Anne Wynne resigns from Sinn Féin
19 May 2022	Dublin South-Central	Green	Independent	Patrick Costello suspended after breaking whip on motion on ownership of the National Maternity Hospital
19 May 2022	Dublin Central	Green	Independent	Neasa Hourigan suspended after breaking whip on motion on ownership of the National Maternity Hospital
6 July 2022	Donegal	Fine Gael	Independent	Joe McHugh resigns whip to vote against Remediation of Dwellings Damaged By the Use of Defective Concrete Blocks Bill 2022
23 November 2022	Dublin South-Central	Independent	Green	Patrick Costello regains party whip
23 November 2022	Dublin Central	Independent	Green	Neasa Hourigan regains party whip
22 March 2023	Dublin Central	Green	Independent	Neasa Hourigan suspended after breaking whip on motion on extension of eviction ban
10 November 2023	Cork South-West	Independent	Independent Ireland	Michael Collins co-founds Independent Ireland
10 November 2023	Limerick County	Independent	Independent Ireland	Richard O'Donoghue co-founds Independent Ireland
12 February 2024	Roscommon–Galway	Independent	Independent Ireland	Michael Fitzmaurice joins Independent Ireland
16 July 2024	Dublin Bay North	Labour		Election of Aodhán Ó Ríordáin to the European Parliament
16 July 2024	Clare	Independent		Election of Michael McNamara to the European Parliament
16 July 2024	Carlow–Kilkenny	Sinn Féin		Election of Kathleen Funchion to the European Parliament
16 July 2024	Laois–Offaly	Fianna Fáil		Election of Barry Cowen to the European Parliament
July 2024	Dublin Central	Independent	Green	Neasa Hourigan regains party whip
27 August 2024	Clare	Fine Gael		Resignation of Joe Carey on medical grounds
9 October 2024	Kildare South	Sinn Féin	Independent	Resignation of Patricia Ryan from Sinn Féin
12 October 2024	Laois–Offaly	Sinn Féin	Independent	Resignation of Brian Stanley from Sinn Féin
