= List of political parties in the Republic of Ireland =

There are a number of political parties in Ireland, and coalition governments are common. The two historically largest parties, Fianna Fáil and Fine Gael, arose from a split in the original Sinn Féin. Fine Gael is the successor of Cumann na nGaedheal, the faction that supported the 1921 Anglo-Irish Treaty, while Fianna Fáil arose from members of the anti-Treaty faction who opposed Sinn Féin's abstensionism. The division on the Treaty had also caused the Irish Civil War (1922–1923), leading to the difference between the parties being described as "Civil War politics", to distinguish it from a more common left-right political divide. Fianna Fáil and Fine Gael together are sometimes pejoratively referred to as "FFG".

As of 2024, Fianna Fáil is the largest party in Dáil Éireann, followed by Sinn Féin in second, and closely by Fine Gael in third position. The Labour Party was formed in 1912, and it had usually been the third party in parliamentary strength, though it is currently the fourth largest party in the Dáil, followed closely by the Social Democrats in fifth.

The Electoral Commission maintains a Register of Political Parties under the Electoral Reform Act 2022. Before the establishment of the Commission 2023, the register was maintained by the Houses of the Oireachtas. To register to contest national elections a party must have either at least one member in Dáil Éireann or the European Parliament, or 300 recorded members aged 18 or over. Parties that register only to contest elections in part of the state or in local elections need only 100 recorded members aged 18 or over. In either case, at least half of the recorded members must be on the register of electors.

== Political parties with representation at a local, national or European level ==
=== Party details ===
Party	Current leader(s)	Founded	Inaugural leader(s)	Position	International affiliation	EP group
Fianna Fáil	Micheál Martin	1926	Éamon de Valera	Centre to centre-right	LI	Renew
Sinn Féin	Mary Lou McDonald	1905 (Note: The original Sinn Féin party split in 1970, with the majority faction becoming Official Sinn Féin (later renamed to the Workers' Party). One of the smaller factions formed a party named Provisional Sinn Féin, and after Official Sinn Féin changed its name, Provisional Sinn Féin changed its name to Sinn Féin. Although the present Sinn Féin was founded in 1970, it claims to be a continuation of the original Sinn Féin.)	Arthur Griffith	Centre-left to left-wing	—N/a	The Left
Fine Gael	Simon Harris	1933	Eoin O'Duffy	Centre to centre-right	CDI	EPP
Green Party; Comhaontas Glas	Roderic O'Gorman	1981	—N/a (Note: For the first twenty years of its existence, the Green Party did not have a national leader. Trevor Sargent was elected as the first national leader in 2001.)	Centre-left to left-wing	GG	Greens/EFA
Labour Party	Ivana Bacik	1912	James Connolly; James Larkin; William O'Brien	Centre-left	PA; SI	S&D
Social Democrats	Holly Cairns	2015	Catherine Murphy; Róisín Shortall; Stephen Donnelly	Centre-left	—N/a	—N/a
PBP–Solidarity	Collective leadership	2015	—N/a	Left-wing to far-left	—N/a	—N/a
Independent Ireland	Michael Collins	2023	Michael Collins	Centre-right to right-wing	—N/a	Renew
Aontú	Peadar Tóibín	2019	Peadar Tóibín	Fiscal: left-wing Social: right wing	—N/a	—N/a
100% Redress	Tomás Seán Devine	2023	Tomás Seán Devine	Single-issue	—N/a	—N/a
Human Dignity Alliance	Rónán Mullen	2018	Rónán Mullen	Right-wing	—N/a	—N/a
Right to Change	Joan Collins	2020	Joan Collins	Left-wing	—N/a	—N/a
Workers and Unemployed Action	Séamus Healy	1985	Séamus Healy	Left-wing	—N/a	—N/a
Workers' Party	Michael McCorry	1970 (Note: The Workers' Party emerged as the majority faction from a split in Sinn Féin in 1970, becoming known as Official Sinn Féin. In the Republic of Ireland, it renamed itself as Sinn Féin The Workers' Party in 1977. In Northern Ireland, it continued with the Republican Clubs name used by Sinn Féin to escape a 1964 ban, and later as Workers Party Republican Clubs. Both sections adopted the current name in 1982.)	Arthur Griffith	Far-left	IMCWP	—N/a
Republican Sinn Féin	Seosamh Ó Maoileoin	1986 (Note: Republican Sinn Féin split from Sinn Féin in 1986 over the policy of abstentionism.)	Ruairí Ó Brádaigh	Left-wing	—N/a	—N/a
Independent Left	—N/a	2019	—N/a	Left-wing	—N/a	—N/a

=== Party representation ===
Party	Representation (as of Oct. 2026)			
Party	Oireachtas		European Parliament	Local councils
Party	Dáil Éireann	Seanad Éireann	European Parliament	Local councils
Fianna Fáil	48 / 174	19 / 60	4 / 14	246 / 949
Sinn Féin (Note: Sinn Féin also has 7 members of the UK House of Commons, 27 members of the Northern Ireland Assembly, 144 local councillors in Northern Ireland.)	39 / 174	6 / 60	2 / 14	99 / 949
Fine Gael	38 / 174	16 / 60	4 / 14	246 / 949
Social Democrats	12 / 174	1 / 60	0 / 14	31 / 949
Labour	11 / 174	2 / 60	1 / 14	57 / 949
Independent Ireland	4 / 174	0 / 60	1 / 14	27 / 949
PBP–Solidarity (Note: People Before Profit also has 1 member of the Northern Ireland Assembly and 2 local councillors in Northern Ireland)	3 / 174	0 / 60	0 / 14	12 / 949
Aontú	2 / 174	1 / 60	0 / 14	10 / 949
Green (Note: The Green Party also has 5 local councillors in Northern Ireland)	1 / 174	1 / 60	0 / 14	23 / 949
100% Redress	1 / 174	0 / 60	0 / 14	4 / 949
Right to Change	0 / 174	0 / 60	0 / 14	1 / 949
Kerry Ind. Alliance	0 / 174	0 / 60	0 / 14	1 / 949
Workers and Unemployed	0 / 174	0 / 60	0 / 14	1 / 949
Republican Sinn Féin (Note: Unregistered party)	0 / 174	0 / 60	0 / 14	1 / 949
Independent Left	0 / 174	0 / 60	0 / 14	1 / 949

== Parties and groupings represented in the Oireachtas ==
=== Fianna Fáil ===
Fianna Fáil is the largest party in the Dáil, has the joint largest delegation of MEPs from Ireland, and has the largest number of city and county council seats. It has been in government more than any other party: 1932–1948, 1951–1954, 1957–1973, 1977–1981, 1982, 1987–1994, and 1997–2011, and since 2020. On all occasions up to 1989, it was in a single-party government; on all occasions since then it was the leading party in a coalition government. It is a member of the Alliance of Liberals and Democrats for Europe Party and is led by Taoiseach Micheál Martin.

It was founded in 1926 by Éamon de Valera in a split from Sinn Féin. When Sinn Féin refused to drop its abstentionist stand, de Valera led most of its TDs out of that party with a view toward republicanising the Free State from within. It was founded as a radical anti-Treaty party drawing support from small farmers and urban workers but has since become a party of the establishment. It was first elected to power in 1932 on a constitutional republican platform, promising to remove constitutional links with Britain and reduce poverty by creating employment. It oversaw much of the industrial development of the Republic and has consequently drawn support from all social classes, making it a classic populist party.

Fianna Fáil has 48 TDs, 19 senators, 4 MEPs and 246 councillors.

=== Sinn Féin ===
Sinn Féin is the second largest party in the Dáil and the largest party in the Northern Ireland Assembly. The name Sinn Féin, meaning "ourselves" or "we ourselves", has been used by a number of political organisations in Ireland since 1905, when first used by Arthur Griffith. Sinn Féin was the party of separatism before Irish independence, and broke through in the Westminster election of 1918, where it won 73 of the 105 Irish seats.

The modern-day Sinn Féin party emerged in 1970 after a split in the party, and was often distinguished as Provisional Sinn Féin. It was closely linked to the Provisional Irish Republican Army. It is led by Mary Lou McDonald.

Sinn Féin has 39 TDs, 6 senators, 2 MEPs and 99 councillors in the Republic of Ireland.

=== Fine Gael ===
Fine Gael is the third largest party in the Dáil, the second largest party in local government in Ireland and has joint largest delegation of MEPs from Ireland. It was founded in 1933 by a merger of Cumann na nGaedheal, which had supported the Treaty and formed the government between 1922 and 1932, the National Guard (popularly called the Blueshirts) and the small National Centre Party. It is a member of the centre-right European People's Party and is led by Tánaiste Simon Harris. Counting the tenure of predecessor Cumann na nGaedheal, Fine Gael has been in government in the periods 1922–1932, 1948–1951, 1954–1957, 1973–1977, 1981–1982, 1982–1987, 1994–1997, and 2011 to date. On each occasion from 1948 until 2016, it was the leading party of a coalition with the Labour Party, and in three of those cases also with other smaller parties. At the 2011 general election, Fine Gael became the largest party in the Oireachtas with 36.1% of the vote.

Fine Gael has 38 TDs, 16 senators, 4 MEPs and 246 councillors.

=== Labour Party ===
The Labour Party is a social democratic party, founded in 1912 as part of the trade union movement, with which it maintains organisational links. For most of the history of the state, it was the third largest party, though it is currently in fifth position in parliamentary strength.

It has been in government in the periods 1948–1951, 1954–1957, 1973–1977, 1981–1982, 1982–1987, 1993–1994, 1994–1997, and 2011–2016. On each occasion, it was in coalition with Fine Gael, with the exception 1993 to 1994, when it was in coalition with Fianna Fáil. The Labour Party merged with the smaller Democratic Left party in 1999. It is a member of the Party of European Socialists, and is led by Ivana Bacik.

The Labour Party has 11 TDs, 2 senators, 1 MEP and 57 councillors.

=== Social Democrats ===
The Social Democrats were founded in July 2015 by three independent TDs Catherine Murphy, Róisín Shortall, and Stephen Donnelly (who left the party for Fianna Fáil in 2017). It is led by Holly Cairns. The Social Democrats have 12 TDs, 1 senator and 31 councillors.

=== People Before Profit–Solidarity ===
People Before Profit–Solidarity is an electoral alliance between the left-wing People Before Profit (PBP) and Solidarity parties. While the alliance was formed for electoral purposes in October 2015, the member parties continue to organise separately.

People Before Profit–Solidarity have 3 TDs and 12 councillors.

=== Independent Ireland ===
Independent Ireland was registered in November 2023 and was founded by two TDs, Michael Collins and Richard O'Donoghue, both members of the Rural Independents Dáil grouping. It has 4 TDs, 1 MEP and 27 councillors.

=== Aontú ===
Aontú is an all-Ireland republican party with a left-wing economic stance and a conservative social position. It was founded in 2019 by Peadar Tóibín who left Sinn Féin because of its support for the Health (Regulation of Termination of Pregnancy) Act 2018. It has 2 TDs, 1 senator and ten councillors in the Republic of Ireland.

=== Green Party ===
The Green Party was established in 1981 and is allied to the European Green Party. The Green Party Northern Ireland voted in 2005 to become a region of the Irish Green Party, making it the second party to be organised on an all-Ireland basis. It has Northern Ireland members on the Irish Green Party national executive.

In June 2007, the Green Party entered coalition government with Fianna Fáil and the Progressive Democrats. In January 2011 they left the coalition, and at the 2011 general election, lost all of their Dáil seats. From 2020 to 2024, it was in a coalition government with Fianna Fáil and Fine Gael.

In the 2024 election, they went from 12 seats to one seat. The Green Party has 1 TD, 1 senator and 23 councillors.

=== 100% Redress ===
100% Redress was founded in County Donegal in 2023, campaigning on the Irish defective block crisis. It has 1 TD, and four councillors on Donegal County Council.

== Parties represented only on local authorities ==
=== Right to Change ===
Right to Change was founded in May 2020 by Joan Collins. It has one councillor.

=== Workers and Unemployed Action ===
Workers and Unemployed Action (WUA) is a left-wing political organisation formed in 1985 by Séamus Healy. At the 2011 election, the WUA formed part of the United Left Alliance, but it left in 2012. WUA has one councillor on Tipperary County Council.

=== Kerry Independent Alliance ===
The Kerry Independent Alliance (previously the South Kerry Independent Alliance) have one councillor on Kerry County Council. It is registered to contest elections for Dáil Éireann and in Killarney for local elections.

=== Republican Sinn Féin ===
Republican Sinn Féin were formed in 1986 by members of Sinn Féin who did not support the decision made at the party's ard fheis in that year to end its policy of abstentionism and to allow elected Sinn Féin TDs take their seats in Dáil Éireann. They have one councillor, Tomás Ó Curraoin on Galway County Council. As the party is not registered, he is officially an independent councillor.

=== Independent Left ===
Independent Left have one councillor, former PBP member John Lyons, on Dublin City Council. As the party is not registered, he is officially an independent councillor.

== Parties with no elected representation ==
Party	Leader	Ideology	Position
Centre Party (formerly Renua)	Andrew Kelly	Anti-abortion	Right-wing to far-right
Communist	Ciara Ní Mhaoilfhinn	Communism	Far-left
Éirígí	Brian Leeson	Irish republicanism	Far-left
Farmers' Alliance	Liam McLaughlin	Agrarianism	Right-wing
Fís Nua	None	Green politics	Left-wing
Glór (Note: Originally registered as the Housing Rights and Reform Alliance; renamed the Reform Alliance in November 2021; renamed Glór – Voice of the People in November 2023)	Diarmaid Ó Cadhla	N/A	
Ireland First (Note: Member party of National Alliance)	Disputed	Anti-immigration	Far-right
Irish Freedom	Disputed	Hard Euroscepticism	Right-wing to far-right
The Irish People (Note: Member party of National Alliance)	AJ Cahill	Anti-immigration	Far-right
Irish Republican Socialist	Ard chomhairle	Irish republicanism	Far-left
Liberty Republic	Ben Gilroy	Anti-immigration	Far-right
National Party	Gerry Kinneavy	Anti-immigration	Far-right
Party for Animal Welfare	Carol Johnson	Animal welfare	N/A
Rabharta	Lorna Bogue	Eco-socialism	Left-wing
Saoradh	Brian Kenna	Irish republicanism	Far-left
United People (Note: Split from Direct Democracy Ireland in 2015)	Jeffrey Rudd	N/A	
Workers' Party	Michael McCorry	Marxism–Leninism	Far-left

== See also ==
- List of political parties by country
- List of political parties in Northern Ireland
