= Clare Daly =

Irish politician (born 1968)

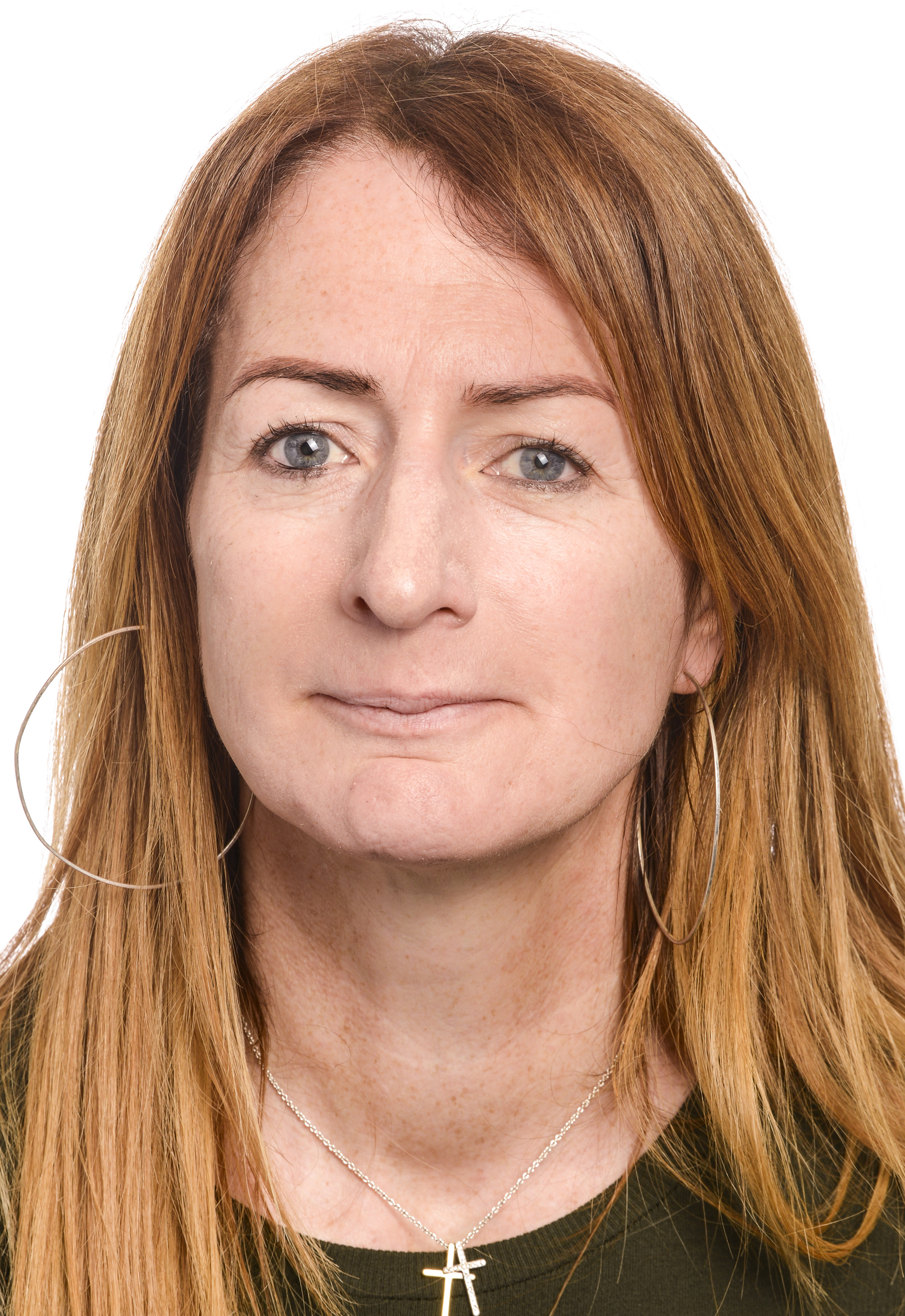
- Daly in 2019

Member of the European Parliament
- In office 2 July 2019 – 17 July 2024
- Constituency: Dublin

Teachta Dála
- In office February 2016 – July 2019
- Constituency: Dublin Fingal
- In office February 2011 – February 2016
- Constituency: Dublin North

Personal details
- Born: 16 April 1968 (age 58) Newbridge, County Kildare, Ireland
- Party: Ireland: Independent; EU: The Left
- Other political affiliations: Independents 4 Change (2014–2026); United Left (2013–2015); Socialist Party (1996–2012); Labour Party (until 1989)
- Spouse: Michael Murphy (m. 1999, separated)
- Children: 1
- Education: Dublin City University
- Website: claredaly.ie

Clare Daly (born 16 April 1968) is an Irish politician who was a Member of the European Parliament (MEP) from Ireland for the Dublin constituency from July 2019 to July 2024. She is a member of Independents 4 Change, affiliated to The Left in the European Parliament.

In the 1980s, Daly was a member of the Labour Party as a teenager, but was later expelled alongside other members after they were accused of being Trotskyists infiltrating the party using the tactic of entryism. She went on to be a founding member of "Militant Labour", later renamed the Socialist Party. In 1999 she was elected to Fingal County Council, a position she held for 12 years. Daly was elected as a Socialist Party TD for the Dublin North constituency at the 2011 general election.

Since 2012, Daly has had a close political association with Mick Wallace. After the Socialist Party condemned Wallace for tax evasion, Daly left the party in August 2012 and formed United Left.

After becoming an MEP, Daly gained international attention for her foreign policy positions, particularly on Russia. Describing herself as an opponent of "EU militarism", her views have been the subject of controversy and criticism in Europe, but have been promoted by state-controlled media in Russia, China, Iran, Syria, and other authoritarian states. Daly lost her seat in the 2024 European Parliament election. She was a candidate in Dublin Central in the 2024 general election but was eliminated on the 4th count.

== Life and career ==
=== Early years and education ===
Daly is from Newbridge, County Kildare. Her father, Kevin Daly, was a colonel in the Irish Army, where he was Director of Signals. She is an atheist, while her brother and an uncle are Catholic priests. Daly studied accountancy at Dublin City University (DCU). She was twice elected president of the Students' Union, serving from 1988 to 1990, and was active in the students' movement as a campaigner for abortion rights and information. On leaving college she took a job in the catering section of Aer Lingus on a low wage, and became SIPTU's shop steward at Dublin Airport.

=== Early political career ===
Daly initially joined the Labour Party, where she was elected to the party's Administrative Committee as a youth representative. A member of Labour's Militant Tendency, she was expelled from the party in 1989 alongside Joe Higgins and other supporters of the faction after they were accused of being Trotskyists infiltrating the party using the tactic of entryism. At first calling themselves Militant Labour, in 1996 they formed the Socialist Party.

=== County councillor (1999 to 2011) ===
Daly was elected for the Swords area at the 1999 Fingal County Council election. She was re-elected at the 2004 local elections and the 2009 local elections, topping the poll on both occasions.

In 2003, Daly was jailed for a month, alongside 21 others from the Anti-Bin Tax Campaign for breaching a High Court order preventing protests leading to obstruction of the council's non-collection policy for those not paying bin charges. in 2011, she announced that she would not register to pay a new household charge brought in as part of the latest austerity budget, calling it "reprehensible", and telling Phil Hogan, the minister responsible, in the Dáil: "You can't bring everyone to court". She was an organiser of the Anti-Water charges campaign in Swords in 2014.

She first ran for a seat in Dáil Éireann at the 1997 general election, receiving 7.2% on that occasion and 8.2% at the 1998 Dublin North by-election. At the 2002 general election she received 5,501 votes (12.5%), narrowly missing a seat. At the 2007 general election she received 9% of the vote.

=== Teachta Dála (2011 to 2019) ===
Elections to the Dáil
Party	Election		FPv	FPv%	Result
Socialist Party	Dublin North	1997	2,971	7.2	Eliminated on count 6/7
Socialist Party	Dublin North	1998	2,692	8.2	Eliminated on count 12/14
Socialist Party	Dublin North	2002	5,501	12.5	Eliminated on count 8/8
Socialist Party	Dublin North	2007	4,872	8.9	Eliminated on count 7/10
Socialist Party	Dublin North	2011	7,513	15.2	Elected on count 6/7
Inds. 4 Change	Dublin North	2016	9,480	15.7	Elected on count 4/10
Inds. 4 Change	Dublin Central	2024	1,317	4.0	Eliminated on count 4/11

She was eventually elected to Dáil Éireann at the 2011 general election, taking 15.2% of the first preference vote. During the presidential election campaign later that year, Daly and Joe Higgins supported the nomination of independent candidate David Norris in his search for the 20 Oireachtas members necessary for inclusion on the ballot paper.

In February 2012, it was reported that she would introduce a bill to provide for limited access to abortion where there is "real and substantial risk to the life" of the pregnant woman, in line with the X Case. The bill was defeated before its second reading on 19 April 2012.

In 2012, Daly, Higgins and Joan Collins used travel expenses to cover expenses related to their attendance at anti-household charge meetings around the country. Daly described the dispute over this as a "smear campaign", saying that legal advice was being sought as there was a lack of clarity around the issue and that she would refund any money that was used inappropriately.

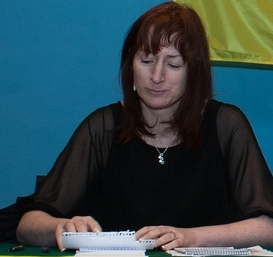
Daly on 14 January 2012

In June of that same year, Daly refused to call for the resignation of her friend and political ally Mick Wallace in the wake of his VAT controversy. It was reported by the Evening Herald that the United Left Alliance, of which the Socialist Party was part, were to confront her over this stance. Daly resigned from the Socialist Party on 31 August 2012. In a statement, the Socialist Party said "it believed Ms Daly had resigned because she placed more value on her political connection with Independent TD Mick Wallace than on the political positions and work of the Socialist Party." Daly described the claim as "absolute nonsense" and said that she had not called for Wallace's resignation because the Socialist Party had not called for his resignation. She requested a share of the €120,000 Socialist Party's Leaders Allowance to allow her to continue to fund her activities as an Independent TD.

In April 2013, along with another TD, Joan Collins, she founded a new political party called United Left.

Following the 39th G8 summit, Daly accused the Fine Gael–Labour government of "prostituting" the country to US President Barack Obama and criticised what she described as media and political "slobbering" over his wife Michelle and their children during their stay in Ireland. She also called Obama a hypocrite and a war criminal for speaking about peace whilst using drones to bomb foreign civilians and wanting to supply weapons to Syrian rebels. Taoiseach Enda Kenny responded to her comments, saying they were "disgraceful" and "beneath you" since President Obama had supported peace in Northern Ireland.

In January 2013, Daly was arrested after taking an illegal turn while driving, under suspicion of drink driving. Daly admitted to having consumed a hot whiskey, but a urine test found that she was below the legal alcohol limit for driving. In 2016, an investigation by the Garda Síochána Ombudsman Commission found that details of Daly's arrest had been leaked in an unauthorised manner, and that Daly's right to privacy had been breached.

In the aftermath of the November 2015 Paris attacks, Daly criticised Simon Coveney's willingness to send Irish troops to Mali to allow French troops to concentrate on domestic security, stating the Government had "an incredibly fluid interpretation of what it means to be a neutral country". Daly said "Reference has been made to France being better placed and France having a right to defend its citizens. Precisely contradictory remarks were made when Russia engaged in the same reprehensible actions by bombing Syria in response to attacks on Russia. The West said Russia should not be doing that because it was endangering its citizens. That was correct for Russia but it is also correct for France". Coveney accused Daly of attempting to shift blame for the attacks from the perpetrators and onto France itself and other European countries. Coveney said: "The suggestion in this House that we should be looking at ourselves to blame for what happened on the streets of Paris is reprehensible. France has an obligation to defend itself".

In December 2015, Daly along with independent TDs Mick Wallace and Maureen O'Sullivan each put forward offers of a €5,000 surety for a 23-year-old man being prosecuted under terrorism legislation in the Special Criminal Court in Dublin, charged with membership of the terrorist Provisional Irish Republican Army.

At the 2016 general election, she stood as an Independents 4 Change candidate in the Dublin Fingal constituency, and was elected.

In 2018 Daly, Wallace, Maureen O’Sullivan and Catherine Connolly went on a visit to Damascus, Maaloula and Aleppo in Syria. While there, Clare Daly said "[Syrians] feel that they are the victims primarily of Israeli, Saudi, American and Turkish interference". She said Ireland should be neutral in international affairs and not allow Shannon Airport to be used by the US military, which "has been a contributing factor to the destabilisation of Afghanistan, and Iraq, and all the refugees that have flown from that". During the trip, Daly visited areas under the control of the Assad regime, including the Yarmouk Camp in Damascus and the city of Aleppo. Daly was guided around Yarmouk by members of the Popular Front for the Liberation of Palestine – General Command (PFLP-GC), a group aligned with Assad and designated a terrorist organisation by the EU. In a Dáil speech following the trip, Daly stated they had a meeting with pro-Assad businessman Fares Al-Shehabi, head of Aleppo's chamber of commerce, who was under EU sanctions at the time for his support of the Assad regime. Daly later called in the Dáil for Al-Shehabi to be granted a visa to visit Ireland, describing him as a Sunni Muslim and secular businessman who could speak on the Syrian conflict.

=== Member of the European Parliament (2019 to 2024) ===
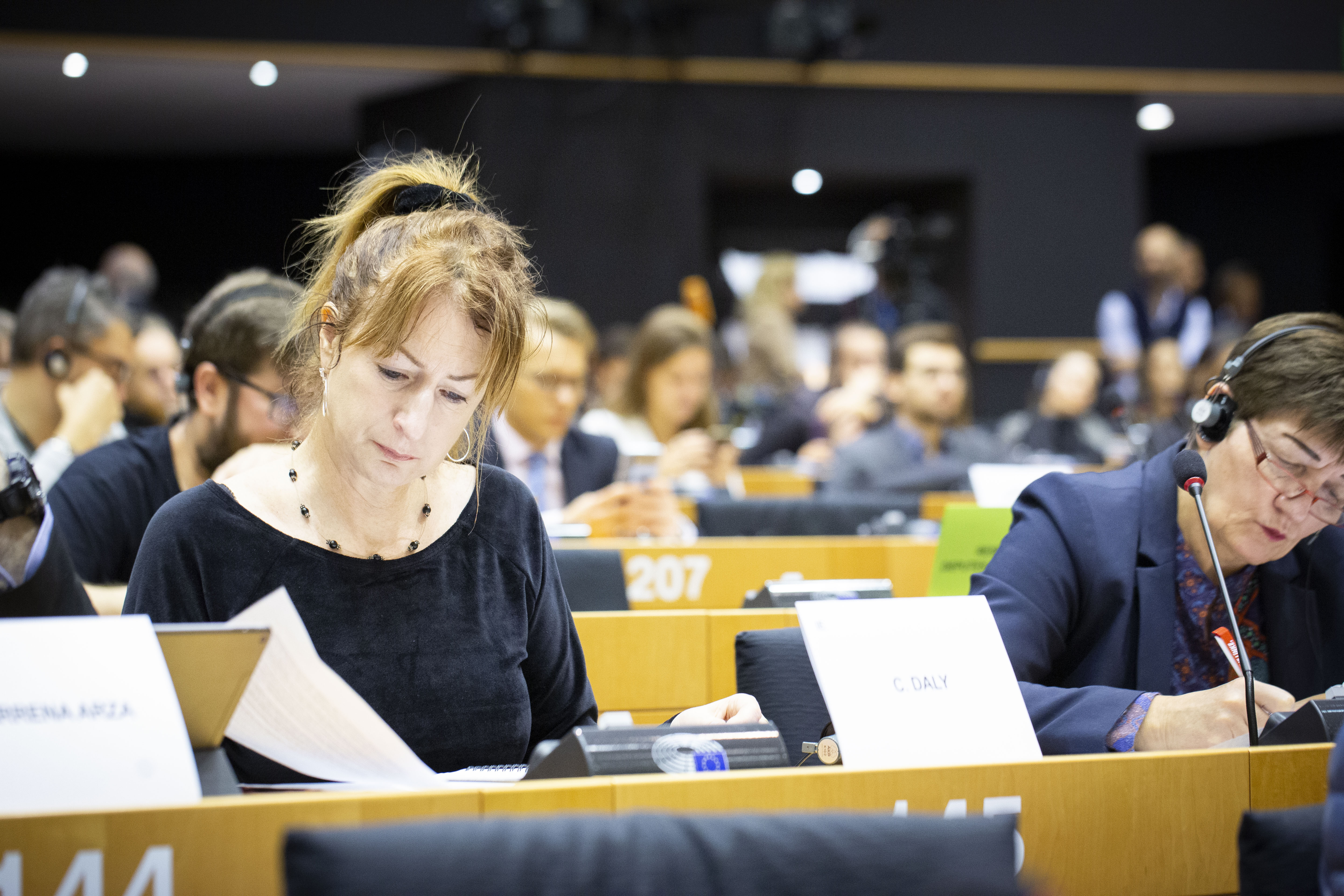
Daly on 3 October 2019

At the 2019 European Parliament elections, she was elected for the Dublin constituency. She received 42,305 first preference votes (11.6%) and took the third seat. The Times, that year, described Daly as "one of the busiest Irish members in the European parliament this term".

The Irish Times reported in April 2022 that, after becoming MEPs, Daly and Wallace were given high profiles in the state-controlled media of authoritarian states such as Russia, China, Iran and Syria. The report said "they are presented as important international figures who confirm regime positions". Daly had been featured in more Chinese-language news articles than any other Irish person, followed by Wallace.

In the 2024 European Parliament elections, she was endorsed by celebrities, Susan Sarandon and Annie Lennox. She lost her seat at this election, with 26,855 (7.1%) first preference votes. Following her defeat, Daly wrote on X: "I have been honoured to have been able to use this platform as a powerful voice for peace, antimilitarism and neutrality. This result is not a rejection of those ideas. It is a testament to the success and reach of the work we’ve done that the establishment came out in such force to harm my chance of reelection. Electoral politics is always only a platform to organise form. That organisation is going on in communities, workplaces, and universities all over Europe. We will continue to fight." While leaving the count centre, she was caught on camera declining an interview with RTÉ, telling the reporter: "You've no interest in talking to me for five years, so I’ve no interest in talking to you."

==== Nepotism and bullying allegations ====
In December 2019, The Times reported that Daly had appointed her former husband, Michael Murphy, as a European Parliamentary Assistant. The rules in the European Parliament prohibit the employment of "spouses or stable non-marital partners". Daly previously employed the son of fellow Independents4Change MEP Mick Wallace. In September 2020, a former parliamentary assistant of Daly, who had worked for her for over seven years and was her election agent in the 2016 general election, accused her of mistreatment and of having "no respect for workers' rights".

==== Visit to Popular Mobilization Forces headquarters ====
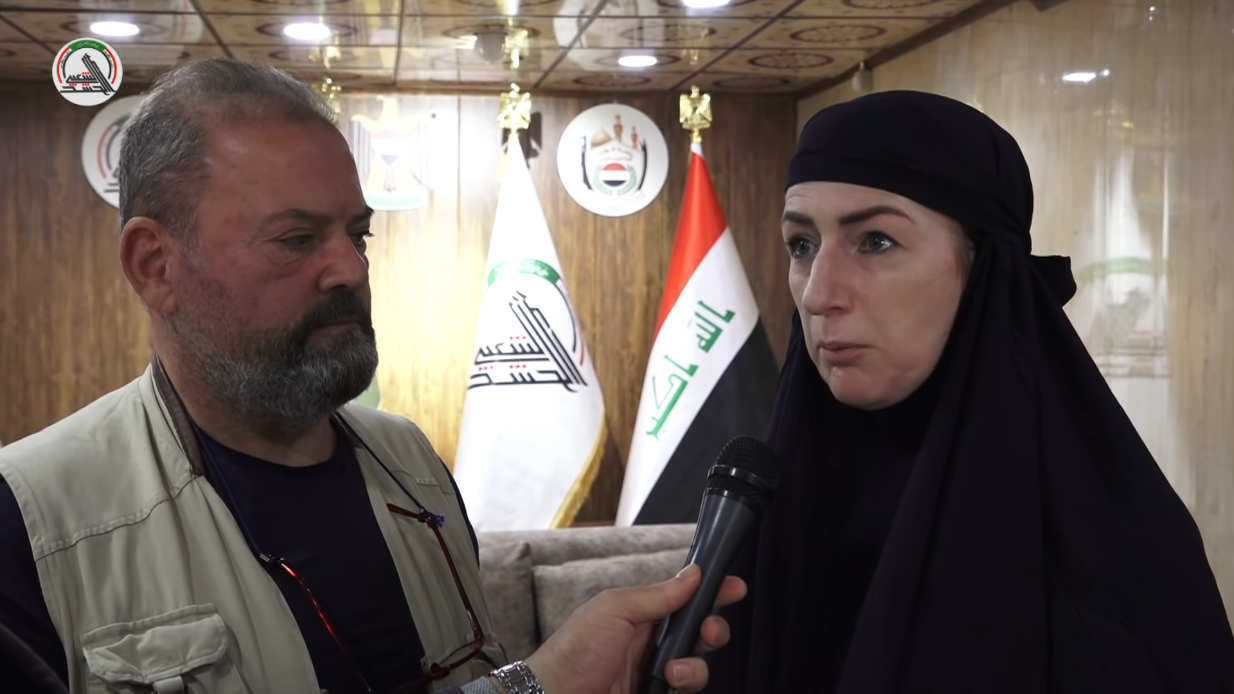
Daly during her appearance in a promotional video released by the Popular Mobilization Forces

In April 2021, Daly and Wallace were called "embarrassments to Ireland" by Fianna Fáil's Malcolm Byrne after the two MEPs travelled to Iraq and visited the headquarters of the Popular Mobilization Forces (called Hashed al-Shaabi in Arabic), an Iraqi state-sponsored paramilitary network supported by Iran whose militias are accused of war crimes.

Daly was interviewed on camera and praised the PMF's activities, saying it "upholds international law" unlike "the United States and many European countries". The interview was then used in a promotional video by the organization. Byrne alleged that the PMF has "lured gay people to their deaths" and that Daly and Wallace allowed "themselves to be used as propaganda tools". Following a 2024 Human Rights Watch report which stated the militia was involved in abductions, extrajudicial killings, sexual violence, and the targeting of LGBTQ+ people, Daly defended her 2021 comments and dismissed the report as a "complete misrepresentation".

After returning from Iraq, Daly said a priority for a number of Iraqi politicians was the departure of US military forces. She said that, since the Iraqi parliament voted in favour of an American troop withdrawal, US forces were "an occupying power, so in that sense they're fair game. Under international law they're a legitimate target".

==== Russia and Ukraine ====
Daly has consistently voted against resolutions that have been critical of Vladimir Putin's Russia. She said that, while she has not supported Vladimir Putin, she is "an unapologetic opponent of the rampant Russophobia that prevails and only benefits the military-industrial complex". A clip from a European parliament speech by Daly was broadcast on Russian state media Rossiya 1 and Channel One Russia, where a presenter and a guest said it was "evidence that western politicians were coming around to the Kremlin point of view on the Ukraine invasion". For her statements about the Russian invasion of Ukraine, the Security Service of Ukraine added Daly to a list of public figures it regards as spreading Russian disinformation and propaganda. Daly responded by accusing Ukraine's government of a "smear campaign against international figures who refuse to toe the line".

According to The Irish Times, Daly's and Wallace's positions on Putin's Russia have caused tensions with other members of The Left in the European Parliament. Wallace and Daly tabled amendments on behalf of the Left, seeking to "water down" resolutions against Russia. They sought to remove a statement that a Dutch-led investigation found that Russia's military supplied the missile which downed Malaysia Airlines Flight 17, killing 298 civilians.

Daly said that the Russian occupation of Crimea since 2014 "has the clear support of the majority of the population". In January 2022, Daly described the Russian military buildup on Ukraine's border as being "clearly defensive" and said there is "no evidence that Russia has any desire to invade Ukraine, it would be of no benefit to them". Amid fears of an invasion, Daly was one of 52 MEPs who voted against providing €1.2 billion in loans to Ukraine, against 598 MEPs in favour.

On 2 March 2022, Daly was one of 13 MEPs who voted against a resolution condemning the Russian invasion of Ukraine. She was criticised by constituents and others in Ireland. Daly later said that she opposed Russia's invasion but had voted against the resolution because it also stated support for NATO and had called for weapons to be sent to Ukraine. Daly said the "decision by Russia to abandon diplomacy and invade Ukraine is contrary to international law. The sole responsibility for this is borne by President Vladimir Putin". She also accused NATO of "destabilising the area for the past decade".

Daly has opposed sanctions against Russia for its invasion of Ukraine. She said that "the ordinary people of Europe" would pay for the sanctions and "not a single Ukrainian life will be saved". Daly added that the EU and military-industrial complex were "fanning the flames" of a "proxy war" with Russia. She later accused the West of arming Ukraine "to keep the war going".

In January 2023, Daly voted against establishing a tribunal to investigate the Russian leadership for crimes of aggression against Ukraine. Daly also voted against a resolution to declare Russia a state sponsor of terrorism. She said "I condemn Russia's invasion and call for a withdrawal" and stated "even the warhawks in the Biden administration have resisted pressure to designate Russia a 'state sponsor of terrorism,' because doing so would close off options for negotiating humanitarian and peace efforts".

Daly denounced Russian opposition leader Alexei Navalny as a "vicious anti-immigrant racist" and asked why MEPs were so outraged at his arrest by Russia's security forces. In a 2024 interview, Daly described the war in Ukraine as "incredibly dangerous for the world" and Volodymyr Zelenskyy's calls for weapons and money as "increasingly unhinged".

==== Support for convicted and alleged Russian spies ====
In November 2021, Daly and Wallace travelled to Lithuania to support Algirdas Paleckis, a politician found guilty of spying for Russia's Federal Security Service in return for money. Daly said the conviction was not based on evidence, and attended court when Paleckis' appeal was being heard. In May 2022, Paleckis's conviction for spying was upheld.

While in Lithuania, Daly and Wallace protested together with Latvian MEP Tatjana Ždanoka. Eight days before the Russian invasion of Ukraine, the three MEPs again protested together in the European Parliament wearing shirts bearing the Russian slogan "Stop killing Donbass children". In January 2024, Ždanoka was also accused of spying for Russian intelligence agencies in a joint investigation by Russian, Latvian, Estonian and Swedish media outlets. Daly responded that journalists should "cover the work that we actually do instead of occupying your time with these constant attempts to construct elaborate guilt-by-association conspiracy theories".

==== Israeli–Palestinian conflict ====
Daly condemned Israel's actions in the Gaza Strip during the Gaza war and accused Israel of committing genocide against the Palestinians in Gaza. On 10 November 2023, she criticised European Commission President Ursula von der Leyen for not calling for a ceasefire, saying that "Israel has spent a month pounding Gaza into rubble and filling the streets with children's blood. With European and American weapons, and European and American support. Still [Von der Leyen] cannot even say the word: 'ceasefire.'" In December 2023, a speech by Daly at the European Parliament went viral. Daly referred to von der Leyen as "Frau Genocide" and accused her of "overriding the foreign policies of elected governments all to cheerlead a brutal apartheid regime that she calls a 'vibrant democracy' as [it] pulverizes a city of children".

==== Syrian chemical attack ====
At a European Parliament committee in April 2021, Daly and Wallace challenged the findings of a report by the Organisation for the Prohibition of Chemical Weapons (OPCW) into the 2018 Douma chemical attack in Syria. They accused the OPCW of wrongly blaming the Assad regime. Daly said that "an independent OCPW is absolutely necessary". Fellow Irish MEP Barry Andrews (of Fianna Fáil) accused Daly and Wallace of spreading a conspiracy theory that the attack was staged by the White Helmets. He expressed "revulsion at the likes of this disinformation". The White Helmets, a Syrian civil protection group that gathered evidence of war crimes, "have been subject of smear campaigns backed by the regime of Bashar al-Assad and ally Russia".

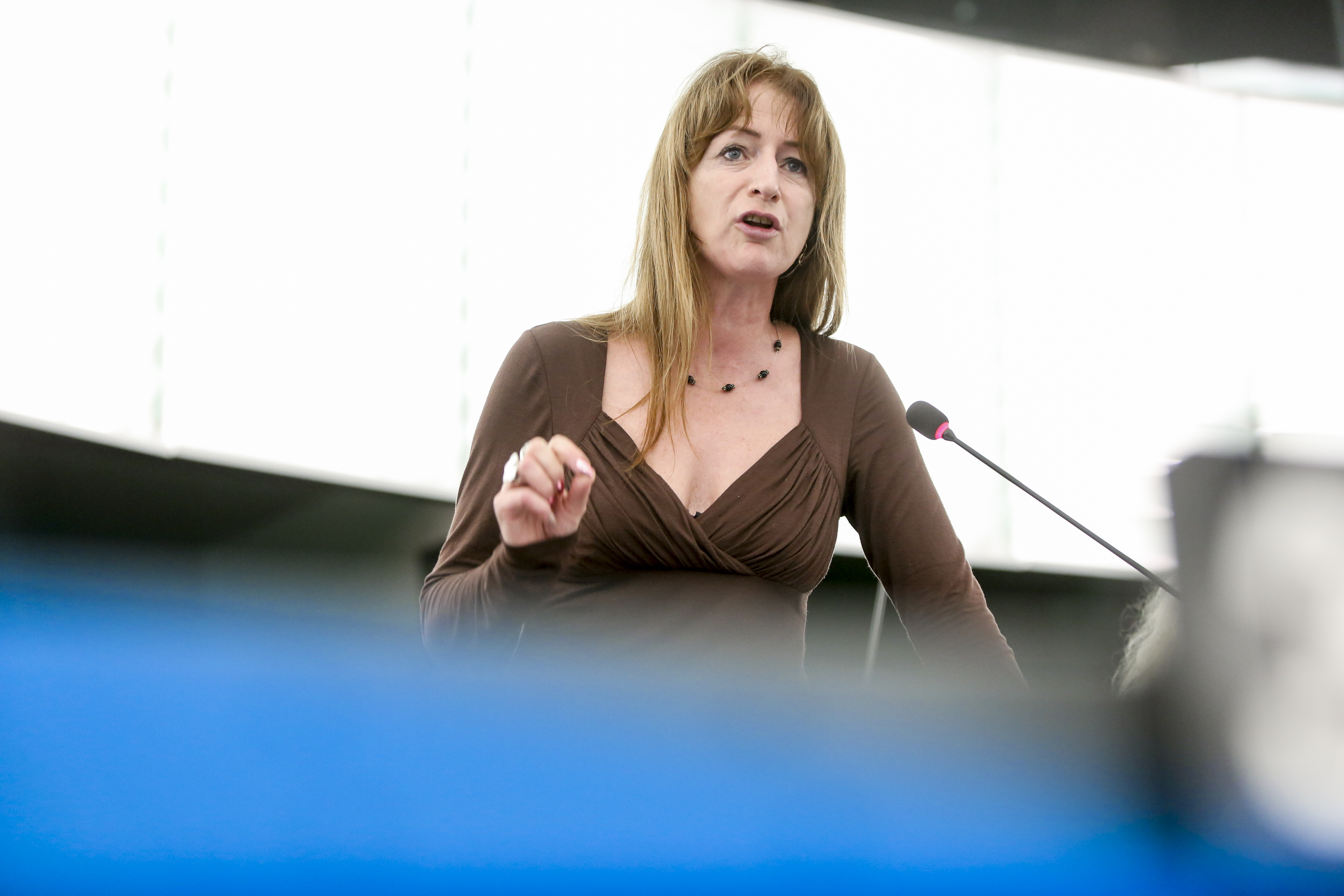
Daly on 22 October 2019

==== Venezuelan and Ecuadorian election monitoring ====
In June 2021, Daly and Wallace were among the MEPs censured by the European Parliament's Democracy Support and Election Coordination Group for acting as unofficial election monitors in the December 2020 Venezuelan parliamentary election and April 2021 Ecuadorian general election without a mandate or permission from the EU. Official European overseas trips had been suspended during the COVID-19 pandemic. Daly and Wallace were barred until the end of 2021 from making any election missions. They were warned that any further such action may result in their ejection from the European Parliament until the end of their terms in 2024. While MEPs can make personal trips overseas, according to The Irish Times, Daly and Wallace made no mention in their tweets that they were acting in an unofficial capacity.

Daly and Wallace issued a joint statement in response that read: "This is a political stunt by the centre right parties in the European Parliament, and we will be challenging it. These were not 'fake' election-observation trips. We made abundantly clear by public announcement at the time that we were not visiting Ecuador or Venezuela with an official election observation mandate." They continued: "Although we regret that the Ecuadorian people did not choose Andrés Arauz as their president, we found the elections to be conducted fairly and impartially, and their results are beyond question." Ecuadorian election officials said that Daly could not be an objective election observer while openly supporting one side, such as Andrés Arauz, over the other.

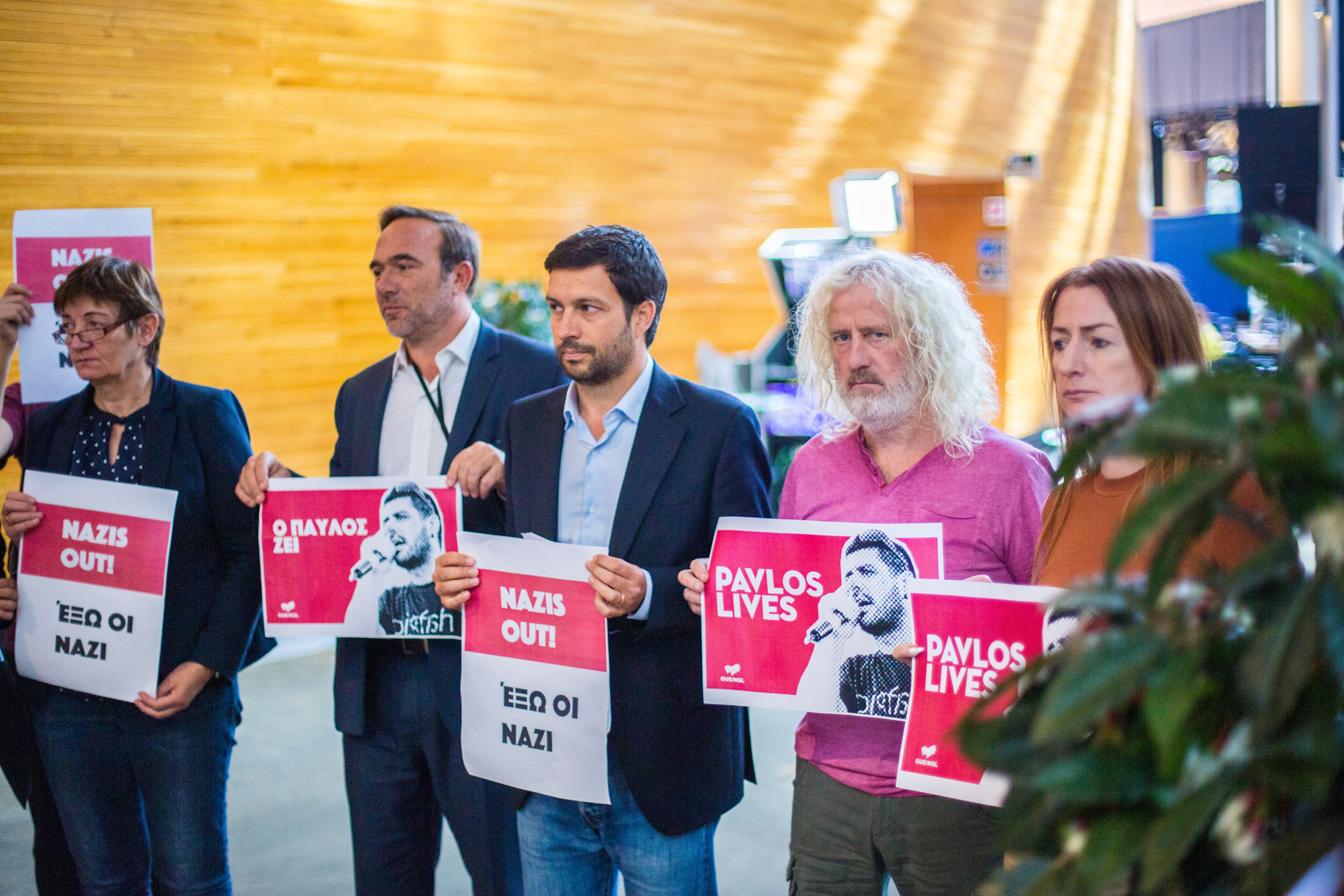
Daly at the 6th anniversary of the murder of Pavlos Fyssas by a member of the neo-fascist group Golden Dawn

Both Daly and Wallace refused to present vaccination certificates upon entering the European Parliament, resulting in them being reprimanded by the European Parliament.

==== Nicaragua ====
On 15 September 2022, she was one of 19 MEPs who voted against condemning Nicaragua for the arrest of Rolando Álvarez.

==== RTÉ lawsuit ====
In April 2022, Daly and Wallace sued for defamation against Ireland's national broadcasting service RTÉ, for undisclosed reasons. Their lawsuit was flagged as a potential threat to press freedom by the Index on Censorship and International Press Institute. The organizations alerted the Council of Europe, filing it under "harassment and intimidation of journalists". A statement from the Index on Censorship said "we believe that they are characteristic of strategic lawsuits against public participation – also known as SLAPPs".

=== Later career ===
After losing her European Parliament seat in 2024, Daly announced that she would run in the Dublin Central constituency in the 2024 general election. She placed tenth with 1,317 first preference votes, 20% of the quota, and was eliminated in the 4th round of counting. In 2026, her political party Independents 4 Change was removed from the political party register.

== Personal life ==
Daly married political activist Michael Murphy in 1999, with whom she had one daughter. They have since separated.

== See also ==
- List of Irish politicians
- List of Irish politicians who changed party affiliation

Dáil	Election	Deputy (Party)	Deputy (Party)	Deputy (Party)	Deputy (Party)	Deputy (Party)	Deputy (Party)	Deputy (Party)	Deputy (Party)
4th	1923	Alfie Byrne (Ind.)	Francis Cahill (CnaG)	Margaret Collins-O'Driscoll (CnaG)	Seán McGarry (CnaG)	William Hewat (BP)	Richard Mulcahy (CnaG)	Seán T. O'Kelly (Rep)	Ernie O'Malley (Rep)
4th	1925 by-election	Alfie Byrne (Ind.)	Patrick Leonard (CnaG)	Margaret Collins-O'Driscoll (CnaG)	Oscar Traynor (Rep)	William Hewat (BP)	Richard Mulcahy (CnaG)	Seán T. O'Kelly (Rep)	Ernie O'Malley (Rep)
5th	1927 (Jun)	Alfie Byrne (Ind.)	John Byrne (CnaG)	Margaret Collins-O'Driscoll (CnaG)	Oscar Traynor (SF)	Denis Cullen (Lab)	Richard Mulcahy (CnaG)	Seán T. O'Kelly (FF)	Kathleen Clarke (FF)
6th	1927 (Sep)	Alfie Byrne (Ind.)	John Byrne (CnaG)	Margaret Collins-O'Driscoll (CnaG)	Patrick Leonard (CnaG)	James Larkin (IWL)	Richard Mulcahy (CnaG)	Seán T. O'Kelly (FF)	Eamonn Cooney (FF)
6th	1928 by-election	Alfie Byrne (Ind.)	John Byrne (CnaG)	Margaret Collins-O'Driscoll (CnaG)	Patrick Leonard (CnaG)	Vincent Rice (CnaG)	Richard Mulcahy (CnaG)	Seán T. O'Kelly (FF)	Eamonn Cooney (FF)
6th	1929 by-election	Thomas F. O'Higgins (CnaG)	John Byrne (CnaG)	Margaret Collins-O'Driscoll (CnaG)	Patrick Leonard (CnaG)	Vincent Rice (CnaG)	Richard Mulcahy (CnaG)	Seán T. O'Kelly (FF)	Eamonn Cooney (FF)
7th	1932	Alfie Byrne (Ind.)	John Byrne (CnaG)	Margaret Collins-O'Driscoll (CnaG)	Oscar Traynor (FF)	Cormac Breathnach (FF)	Richard Mulcahy (CnaG)	Seán T. O'Kelly (FF)	Eamonn Cooney (FF)
8th	1933	Alfie Byrne (Ind.)	Patrick Belton (CnaG)	Vincent Rice (CnaG)	Oscar Traynor (FF)	Cormac Breathnach (FF)	Richard Mulcahy (CnaG)	Seán T. O'Kelly (FF)	Eamonn Cooney (FF)
9th	1937	Constituency abolished. See Dublin North-East and Dublin North-West							

Dáil	Election	Deputy (Party)	Deputy (Party)	Deputy (Party)	Deputy (Party)
22nd	1981	Ray Burke (FF)	John Boland (FG)	Nora Owen (FG)	3 seats 1981–1992
23rd	1982 (Feb)	Ray Burke (FF)	John Boland (FG)	Nora Owen (FG)	3 seats 1981–1992
24th	1982 (Nov)	Ray Burke (FF)	John Boland (FG)	Nora Owen (FG)	3 seats 1981–1992
25th	1987	Ray Burke (FF)	John Boland (FG)	G. V. Wright (FF)	3 seats 1981–1992
26th	1989	Ray Burke (FF)	Nora Owen (FG)	Seán Ryan (Lab)	3 seats 1981–1992
27th	1992	Ray Burke (FF)	Nora Owen (FG)	Seán Ryan (Lab)	Trevor Sargent (GP)
28th	1997	Ray Burke (FF)	Nora Owen (FG)	G. V. Wright (FF)	Trevor Sargent (GP)
28th	1998 by-election	Seán Ryan (Lab)	Nora Owen (FG)	G. V. Wright (FF)	Trevor Sargent (GP)
29th	2002	Seán Ryan (Lab)	Jim Glennon (FF)	G. V. Wright (FF)	Trevor Sargent (GP)
30th	2007	James Reilly (FG)	Michael Kennedy (FF)	Darragh O'Brien (FF)	Trevor Sargent (GP)
31st	2011	James Reilly (FG)	Alan Farrell (FG)	Brendan Ryan (Lab)	Clare Daly (SP)
32nd	2016	Constituency abolished. See Dublin Fingal			

Dáil	Election	Deputy (Party)	Deputy (Party)	Deputy (Party)	Deputy (Party)	Deputy (Party)
32nd	2016	Louise O'Reilly (SF)	Clare Daly (I4C)	Brendan Ryan (Lab)	Darragh O'Brien (FF)	Alan Farrell (FG)
32nd	2019 by-election	Louise O'Reilly (SF)	Joe O'Brien (GP)	Brendan Ryan (Lab)	Darragh O'Brien (FF)	Alan Farrell (FG)
33rd	2020	Louise O'Reilly (SF)	Joe O'Brien (GP)	Duncan Smith (Lab)	Darragh O'Brien (FF)	Alan Farrell (FG)
34th	2024	Constituency abolished. See Dublin Fingal East and Dublin Fingal West.				
