= United Left (Ireland) =

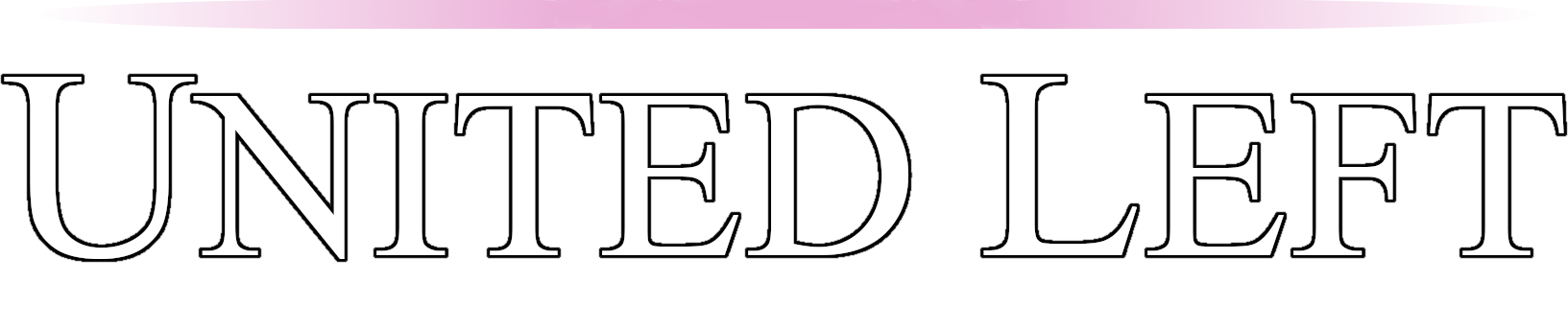
- Founder: Clare Daly; Joan Collins; Declan Bree; Pat Dunne
- Founded: 25 April 2013
- Dissolved: December 2015
- Preceded by: United Left Alliance
- Political position: Left-wing
- Colours: Pink

United Left was a left-wing political party in Ireland founded in 2013. The founders were TDs Clare Daly and Joan Collins, who had been elected at the 2011 election as members of the Socialist Party and People Before Profit Alliance respectively. United Left was added to the official register of political parties in May 2013. Its registered officers were Daly, Collins, Declan Bree of Sligo County Council and Pat Dunne of Dublin City Council, all formerly of the United Left Alliance. As of December 2015, it is no longer a registered political party.

== Election results ==
=== Local government elections ===
Election	First Preference Vote	Vote %	Seats
2014	2,879	0.2%	2 / 949
