= United Left Alliance =

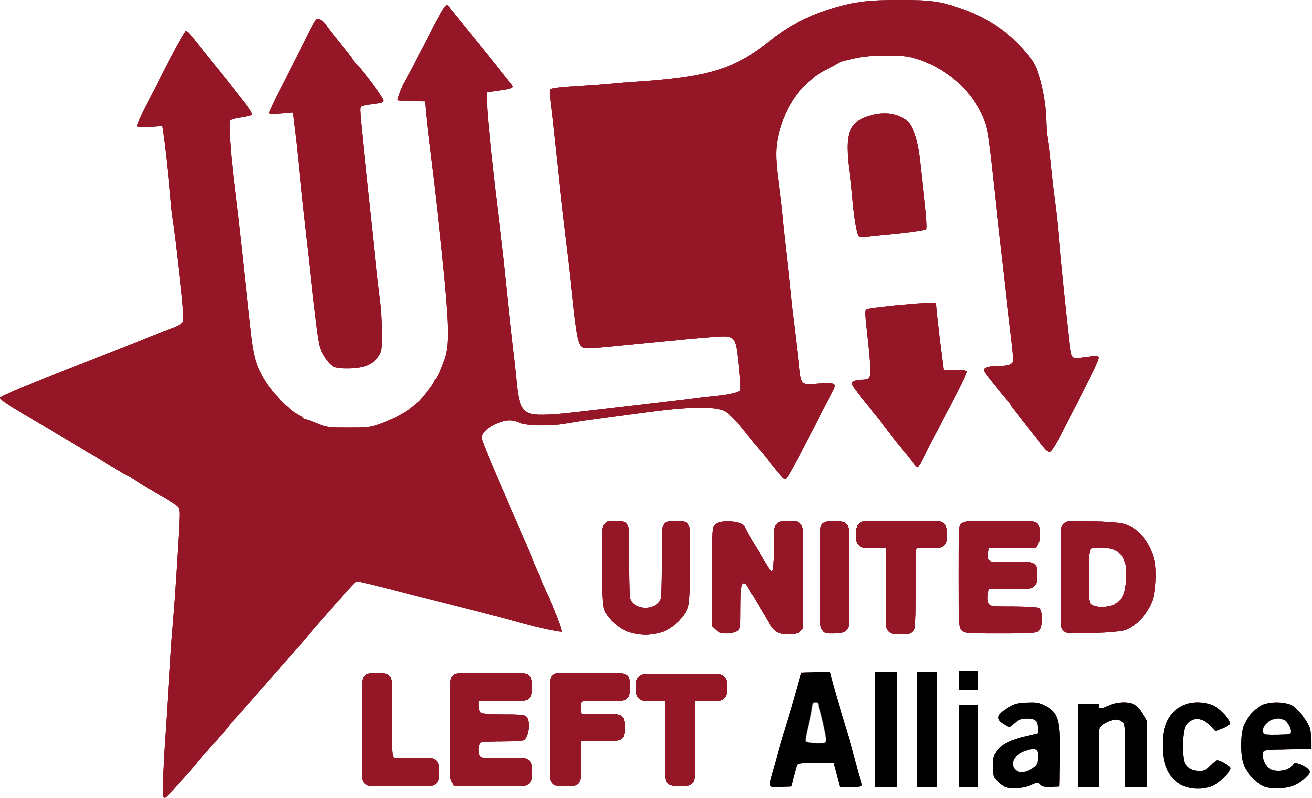
- Abbreviation: ULA
- Founded: 29 November 2010
- Dissolved: May 2013
- Succeeded by: United Left
- Ideology: Democratic socialism
- Political position: Left-wing
- Members: People Before Profit Alliance, Socialist Party (until January 2013), WUAG (until October 2012)

The United Left Alliance (Irish: Comhaontas Aontaithe an Chlé, ULA) was an electoral alliance of left-wing political parties and independent politicians in the Republic of Ireland, formed to contest the 2011 general election. The grouping originally consisted of three existing political parties, the Socialist Party, the People Before Profit Alliance (PBPA), and the Workers and Unemployed Action Group (WUAG), as well as former members of the Labour Party.

Its formation was announced in early November 2010 and it was formally launched on 29 November 2010 at the Gresham Hotel in Dublin. In the February 2011 general election it ran twenty candidates of which five were elected. Its share of the national vote was 2.6%.

The Workers and Unemployed Action Group withdrew from the alliance on 2 October 2012 following disagreements with the other parties. The Socialist Party left the United Left Alliance in January 2013, later co-founding the Anti-Austerity Alliance.

There was a reorientation within the ULA in March 2013 when Joan Collins TD left PBPA and, along with other public representatives Clare Daly TD and Cllr Declan Bree as well as some individual members, formed a new platform or organisation within the ULA called United Left.

Since late 2013, the Alliance is defunct. Although the Alliance was not long-lasting, it arguably paved the way for the creation of Solidarity–People Before Profit, another left-wing electoral alliance in Ireland.

== Foundation ==
The formation of the group was announced at a press conference held on 25 November 2010. This followed the announcement a few days earlier that the Green Party would be exiting from the governing coalition with Fianna Fáil, leading to a general election in early 2011, and the day after the unveiling of a four-year austerity plan to tackle the country's financial crisis.

On 11 January 2011 it was reported that members of the Labour Party in Laois–Offaly had joined the ULA due to dissatisfaction with the selection convention for the general election. Ray Fitzpatrick was selected to run in Laois Offaly as a ULA/Socialist Party candidate. Another candidate Liam Dumpleton chose to break his ties with the ULA and ran as an independent.

Sligo councillor and former Labour TD, Declan Bree's Independent Socialist Group joined the ULA in February 2011, and it was confirmed that Bree would be standing in the Sligo–North Leitrim constituency. Bree had been involved in the talks about setting up the ULA in November 2010 however disagreements arose over the addition of other candidates such as Catherine Connolly in Galway West. The ULA is also receiving backing from Socialist Democracy, a small Trotskyist group. The Irish Republican Socialist Party (IRSP) permits its members to aid ULA election campaigns in a personal capacity but has criticised the ULA's lack of revolutionary and anti-imperialist platforms. A number of other left parties including the Workers' Party and the Communist Party of Ireland are not affiliated to the ULA but co-operate with one another on issues where they hold common positions.

The United Left Alliance name did not appear on ballot papers for the 2011 general election, and candidates were listed under their individual parties or as non-party. This was because the alliance is not yet a registered political party: attempts to have "United Left Alliance" added to the names of the constituent parties by the Registrar of Political Parties had not been completed in time for the 25 February poll.

In April 2012 in Dublin the second ULA conference was held, two non-aligned members (non-Socialist Party or People Before Profit members) of the ULA were elected to the steering committee.

== Programme ==
The alliance declared that it wished to become an alternative to a potential Fine Gael–Labour coalition government that could be formed following the election. They oppose public spending cuts and reductions in welfare and pay rates and have ruled out deals or coalitions with either Fianna Fáil or Fine Gael – who they describe as "right wing parties". The programme agreed by the parties making up the alliance has seven "key demands".

== 2011 general election candidates ==
The alliance initially stated that it expected to stand about twenty candidates for election in 2011. By 14 February twenty had been announced. Five candidates were elected.

Denotes candidates elected to Dáil Éireann

Constituency	Candidate	Party	% Votes
Carlow–Kilkenny	Conor Mac Liam	Socialist Party	1.5
Cork North-Central	Mick Barry	Socialist Party	9.2
Cork North-West	Anne Foley	People Before Profit Alliance	3.4
Dublin Mid-West	Robert Connolly	Socialist Party	1.5
Dublin Mid-West	Gino Kenny	People Before Profit Alliance	5.8
Dublin North	Clare Daly	Socialist Party	15.2
Dublin North-Central	John Lyons	People Before Profit Alliance	3.7
Dublin North-East	Brian Greene	Socialist Party	2.1
Dublin North-West	Andrew Keegan	People Before Profit Alliance	2.1
Dublin South	Nicola Curry	People Before Profit Alliance	1.8
Dublin South-Central	Joan Collins	People Before Profit Alliance	12.9
Dublin South-East	Annette Mooney	People Before Profit Alliance	1.8
Dublin South-West	Mick Murphy	Socialist Party	5.2
Dublin West	Joe Higgins	Socialist Party	19.0
Dún Laoghaire	Richard Boyd Barrett	People Before Profit Alliance	10.9
Laois–Offaly	Ray Fitzpatrick	Socialist Party	0.8
Limerick City	Cian Prendiville	Socialist Party	1.7
Sligo–North Leitrim	Declan Bree	Independent	5.1
Tipperary South	Séamus Healy	Workers and Unemployed Action Group	21.3
Wexford	Séamus O'Brien	People Before Profit Alliance	1.0

== 31st Dáil ==
The five TDs elected under the ULA banner sit as part of the Technical Group, along with 11 other Independent TDs.

It was reported in April 2011 in the political magazine The Phoenix that the ULA was divided between the Socialist Party and the PBPA with "palpable tension between the two groups at their own weekly ULA meetings as well as at Technical Group gatherings, with BB [Richard Boyd Barret] and [Joe] Higgins barely speaking to each other unless required to conduct essential business."

The ULA held its first national convention on 27 June in Liberty Hall in Dublin which was attended by 400 people. The ULA has no constitution nor a mechanism for its members to directly participate in election of officers or decide on policy. It is governed by a "Steering Committee" composed of representatives from the Socialist Party, PBPA, and WUAG. This was originally intended to be an interim arrangement pending agreement between the constituent parties on a permanent party structure. However such an agreement looks increasingly unlikely. The Phoenix magazine on 10 February 2012 reported relations as "descended into fratricide yet again" and "open warfare". A decision was taken by the Steering Committee and communicated to members in November 2011 to hold a national conference of the ULA in late January 2012. It was then changed to 28 April 2012. Two independent members were elected by members unaffiliated to the three founding organisations to the steering committee at the conference.

In September 2011, a national campaign was launched to boycott a proposed €100 household charge. The ULA and its constituent parts are heavily involved in the campaign which also includes other left parties and political groups such as the Workers' Party, Workers Solidarity Movement (Anarchist organisation), Éirígí and some Sinn Féin members and a majority non-aligned activists and householders. Richard Boyd Barrett promised "a mass campaign of resistance" and Joe Higgins promised "a very, very big campaign in political and organisational terms". United Left Alliance TDs Richard Boyd Barrett, Joan Collins, Clare Daly and Joe Higgins opposed the imprisonment of County Offaly pensioner Teresa Treacy, jailed on 13 September 2011 for contempt of court after refusing access to her land for the construction of ESB power lines.

In the two constitutional referendums held alongside the 2011 Irish presidential election, the United Left Alliance advocated a "yes" vote on the Twenty-ninth Amendment (Judges' Remuneration) and a "no" vote on the Thirtieth Amendment (Houses of the Oireachtas Inquiries). The Socialist Party/ULA also unsuccessfully contested the Dublin West by-election securing 21.1% of the first preference vote, in third place behind Labour and Fianna Fáil.

On 2 November 2011, Sinn Féin and United Left Alliance TDs walked out of the Dáil in protest against the government's decision not to hold a debate on the payment of more than €700 million to Anglo Irish Bank bondholders.

They campaigned for a "no" vote in the 2012 European Fiscal Compact referendum.

=== Expenses controversy ===
In 2012 TDs Joan Collins, Claire Daly and Joe Higgins were embroiled in a controversy over expenses claims; their travel expenses seemed to have been used for travel expenses other than for constituency travel and journeys to the Dail, expenses were used for travelling to anti-household charge meetings. Joan Collins TD also admitted to using the expenses to campaign against the household charge, and said she would repay them. Richard Boyd Barrett did not claim travel expenses for travel outside his constituency and Seamus Healy did not use travel expenses for anti-household charge campaign meeting travel. It was subsequently confirmed by the Minister for Public Expenditure Brendan Howlin that they were entitled to claim travelling expenses for travel outside of their constituencies. The ULA and Socialist Party stated at the time that the story was a "manufactured controversy" and part of a "vindictive smear campaign by Independent Newspapers".

=== Wallace controversy ===
In June 2012 it was revealed that independent TD Mick Wallace had knowingly underdeclared VAT. While Wallace was not a member of the ULA, within the Technical Group he was known to be close to the ULA TDs, particularly Clare Daly. Seamus Healy, WUAG TD, immediately called for Wallace to resign his seat, describing his behaviour as "completely and absolutely wrong and unacceptable". Clare Daly, Socialist Party TD for Dublin North, refused to support the call for Wallace to stand down. Daly resigned from the Socialist Party on 31 August 2012. The party said "it believed Ms Daly had resigned because she placed more value on her political connection with Independent TD Mick Wallace than on the political positions and work of the Socialist Party." Daly stated that she intended to remain a member of the ULA as an independent. The Socialist Party responded with a statement on 3 September questioning her future membership as she had "already inflicted serious damage on herself, and some damage on the Socialist Party and the United Left Alliance". On 8 October 2012 Daly appeared on the Tonight with Vincent Browne programme on TV3 and was questioned on her reasons for resigning from the Socialist Party. She stated that "not enough attention was being put into...the building of the ULA" and referred to "plenty of reasons" over a long period. Daly also condemned "the actions" of Mick Wallace in avoiding payments of VAT.

=== Departure of WUAG and the Socialist Party ===
On 2 October 2012 the Workers and Unemployed Action Group withdrew from the United Left Alliance. The party chairman, Seamus Healy, stated that the WUAG's calls for Wallace's resignation had been blocked on a number of occasions by the other parties in the alliance. The party stated that it had a commitment to "tax equity and defence of public services" which could more effectively be campaigned for outside the United Left Alliance. The statement also cited concerns over "factional activity" by the Socialist Workers Party, which it claimed was attempting to boost its own membership at the expense of the ULA.

In December 2012, the Socialist Party stated "we will be diminishing our participation in the ULA". On 26 January 2013, the Socialist Party announced they were withdrawing from the ULA.

=== Formation of the United Left party and decline ===
In April 2013 it was announced that Clare Daly and Joan Collins had officially registered the United Left party and that it would be launched in May 2013.
