= Violet-Anne Wynne =

Irish former politician (born 1987)

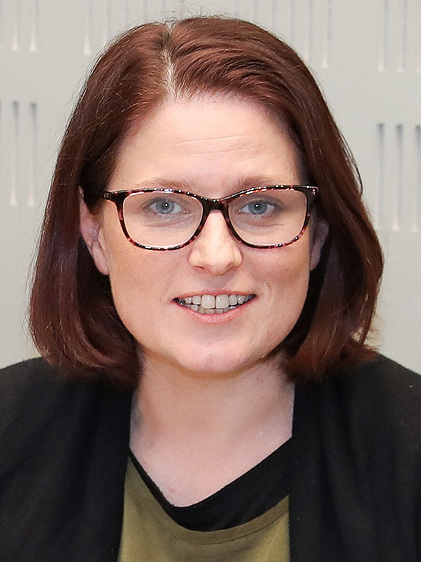
- Wynne in 2023

Teachta Dála
- In office February 2020 – November 2024
- Constituency: Clare

Personal details
- Born: 30 March 1987 (age 39) Tullamore, County Offaly, Ireland
- Party: Independent
- Other political affiliations: Sinn Féin (until 2022)
- Domestic partner: John Montaine
- Children: 6
- Education: Trinity College Dublin

Military service
- Allegiance: Ireland
- Branch/service: Army Reserve
- Unit: Infantry Corps

Violet-Anne Wynne (born 30 March 1987) is an Irish independent politician who served as a Teachta Dála (TD) for the Clare constituency from 2020 until 2024. Elected as a Sinn Féin member, she resigned from the party and became an independent in February 2022 following a series of disputes with the local party organisation.

== Early life and education ==
Wynne is from Tullamore, County Offaly. She attended St Colman's National School nearby and the Coláiste Mhuire in Blakestown. She studied psychology at Trinity College Dublin. She is a former member of the Reserve Defence Forces, having been involved for three years. She has worked as a home help provider for young adults with disabilities, a literacy tutor, and for the crime victims helpline.

== Political career ==
Wynne contested the 2019 Clare County Council election, coming 8th out 9 candidates in the local electoral area of Kilrush, securing 4.2% of the first preference vote.

In 2020, she was chosen by Sinn Féin local branches in Clare to stand for Sinn Féin in the 2020 general election. She had been the local party members' third choice for a candidate, gaining the nomination after their first choice, Councillor Mike McKee, fell ill and died, and their second choice, Noeleen Moran, withdrew from the nomination process after she felt the local branch had not been prompt enough in convening. Wynne had been considered to be a paper candidate in an election Sinn Féin initially did not expect to gain seats in; however, she came second with 15% of the first preference vote following a surge in Sinn Féin popularity during the election campaign.

=== Vaccines ===
Also following her election, journalist Philip Ryan of the Irish Independent suggested that Wynne previously proposed some vaccine hesitancy views regarding the HPV vaccine relating to cervical cancer. The Sinn Féin press office said Wynne's comments were "old remarks" which did not "reflect Sinn Féin policy".

=== Social media conduct ===
In April 2020, Wynne was criticised for her conduct on social media by some of her constituents after she referred to Clare TD Pat Breen and former Clare TD (now Senator) Timmy Dooley as "Prat Breen" and "Timmy Do Nothing". She was also accused of belittling constituents who asked questions in relation to the COVID-19 pandemic. A spokesperson representing Sinn Féin in County Clare referred to her behaviour as "A prime example why the party's social media guidelines should be followed at all times on social media platforms."

Following the criticisms, Wynne issued a formal apology, stating "I understand that a number of remarks I made on Facebook recently have caused offence. I want to apologise for this and to those involved".

=== Resignation from Sinn Féin ===
In February 2022, Wynne resigned from Sinn Féin. Wynne alleged that she was the victim of a campaign of "psychological warfare" from members of the local party but that she did not have a problem with Sinn Féin TDs in the Dáil.

As part of a press release, Wynne stated "I was a proud Sinn Féin TD and took my membership with the party very seriously, I believed that they were the party for United Irelanders and were the future for this island. I now have experience that I can no longer ignore" and went on to suggest that the party did "not take kindly to autonomy and those who do not follow their plans". Wynne resolved to continue her work as TD as an Independent.

Sinn Féin Deputy Whip Denise Mitchell responded stating "I am so very sorry to hear of Violet-Anne's decision this morning. Violet-Anne was a valued member of the Sinn Féin Oireachtas team. The party worked extremely hard over the last two years to resolve challenges at constituency level. That work was continuing."

At the 2024 general election Wynne lost her seat, securing just 310 first preference votes, a 96% drop in votes compared to her 2020 result.

== Personal life ==
Wynne is a member of the Anglican Church of Ireland. She met her partner, John Montaine, while she was living in Blanchardstown, Dublin. In 2011, the couple decided to settle in Tullycrine near Kilrush, County Clare with their children under the Rural Settlement Scheme when Montaine developed health issues that required a slower-paced lifestyle. Wynne supports Montaine's use of cannabis to manage epilepsy.

== Legal issues ==
In 2016, housing charity Rural Resettlement Ireland obtained a court judgement for rent arrears of €12,126.40 owed by Wynne and Montaine. Rural Resettlement Ireland closed down but its operators suggested she should give the owed amount to another charity. She subsequently agreed to do so. In May 2022 Wynne said she was "homeless", having relied on short-term accommodation since leaving a house rendered too small by the birth of her sixth child in February 2022.

In November 2024, a court ordered Wynne to pay €11,500 in compensation to Fiona Smyth, a former employee the Workplace Relations Commission found was unfairly dismissed in March 2023. Smyth, who had worked in Wynne’s constituency office as an administrative assistant, described her sudden termination as unjust and upsetting, especially given the personal support she had extended to Wynne during difficult times. The WRC adjudication officer determined that Wynne's decision to dismiss Smyth via a message to her union representative was “astonishing” and lacked due process, as no letter of dismissal or appeals procedure was provided. While Wynne claimed issues with Smyth’s work performance, the WRC found no substantive evidence that Smyth had failed in her role. Smyth’s dismissal came shortly after she requested time off for an emergency, which coincided with union involvement on her behalf. Additionally, Wynne suggested a breach of trust because Smyth's husband joined Sinn Féin and planned to run in an election, but Smyth clarified her husband was pursuing an apprenticeship and had no election plans. Wynne acknowledged the WRC’s decision and expressed her intention to pay but stated she lacked the funds to settle the award in full, leading Smyth to pursue enforcement proceedings through the courts. At a hearing in Ennis District Court on 13 December 2024, a judge granted the determination order, and Wynne pledged to pay the outstanding fee with her termination payment from Dáil Éireann.

In October 2026 a private landlord sought an order under the residential tenancy act, for Wynne and her partner to immediately vacate a property due to rent arrears standing at €18,000.

Dáil	Election	Deputy (Party)	Deputy (Party)	Deputy (Party)	Deputy (Party)	Deputy (Party)
2nd	1921	Éamon de Valera (SF)	Brian O'Higgins (SF)	Seán Liddy (SF)	Patrick Brennan (SF)	4 seats 1921–1923
3rd	1922	Éamon de Valera (AT-SF)	Brian O'Higgins (AT-SF)	Seán Liddy (PT-SF)	Patrick Brennan (PT-SF)	4 seats 1921–1923
4th	1923	Éamon de Valera (Rep)	Brian O'Higgins (Rep)	Conor Hogan (FP)	Patrick Hogan (Lab)	Eoin MacNeill (CnaG)
5th	1927 (Jun)	Éamon de Valera (FF)	Patrick Houlihan (FF)	Thomas Falvey (FP)	Patrick Hogan (Lab)	Patrick Kelly (CnaG)
6th	1927 (Sep)	Éamon de Valera (FF)	Patrick Houlihan (FF)	Martin Sexton (FF)	Patrick Hogan (Lab)	Patrick Kelly (CnaG)
7th	1932	Éamon de Valera (FF)	Seán O'Grady (FF)	Martin Sexton (FF)	Patrick Hogan (Lab)	Patrick Burke (CnaG)
8th	1933	Éamon de Valera (FF)	Seán O'Grady (FF)	Patrick Houlihan (FF)	Patrick Hogan (Lab)	Patrick Burke (CnaG)
9th	1937	Éamon de Valera (FF)	Seán O'Grady (FF)	Thomas Burke (FP)	Patrick Hogan (Lab)	Patrick Burke (FG)
10th	1938	Éamon de Valera (FF)	Seán O'Grady (FF)	Thomas Burke (FP)	Peter O'Loghlen (FF)	Patrick Burke (FG)
11th	1943	Éamon de Valera (FF)	Seán O'Grady (FF)	Thomas Burke (FP)	Patrick Hogan (Lab)	Patrick Burke (FG)
12th	1944	Éamon de Valera (FF)	Seán O'Grady (FF)	Thomas Burke (FP)	Peter O'Loghlen (FF)	Patrick Burke (FG)
12th	1945 by-election	Éamon de Valera (FF)	Seán O'Grady (FF)	Thomas Burke (FP)	Peter O'Loghlen (FF)	Patrick Shanahan (FF)
13th	1948	Éamon de Valera (FF)	Seán O'Grady (FF)	Thomas Burke (FP)	Patrick Hogan (Lab)	4 seats 1948–1969
14th	1951	Éamon de Valera (FF)	Patrick Hillery (FF)	William Murphy (FG)	Patrick Hogan (Lab)	4 seats 1948–1969
15th	1954	Éamon de Valera (FF)	Patrick Hillery (FF)	William Murphy (FG)	Patrick Hogan (Lab)	4 seats 1948–1969
16th	1957	Éamon de Valera (FF)	Patrick Hillery (FF)	William Murphy (FG)	Patrick Hogan (Lab)	4 seats 1948–1969
16th	1959 by-election	Seán Ó Ceallaigh (FF)	Patrick Hillery (FF)	William Murphy (FG)	Patrick Hogan (Lab)	4 seats 1948–1969
17th	1961	Seán Ó Ceallaigh (FF)	Patrick Hillery (FF)	William Murphy (FG)	Patrick Hogan (Lab)	4 seats 1948–1969
18th	1965	Seán Ó Ceallaigh (FF)	Patrick Hillery (FF)	William Murphy (FG)	Patrick Hogan (Lab)	4 seats 1948–1969
18th	1968 by-election	Seán Ó Ceallaigh (FF)	Patrick Hillery (FF)	Sylvester Barrett (FF)	Patrick Hogan (Lab)	4 seats 1948–1969
19th	1969	Frank Taylor (FG)	Patrick Hillery (FF)	Sylvester Barrett (FF)	3 seats 1969–1981	
20th	1973	Frank Taylor (FG)	Brendan Daly (FF)	Sylvester Barrett (FF)	3 seats 1969–1981	
21st	1977	Frank Taylor (FG)	Brendan Daly (FF)	Sylvester Barrett (FF)	3 seats 1969–1981	
22nd	1981	Madeleine Taylor (FG)	Brendan Daly (FF)	Sylvester Barrett (FF)	Bill Loughnane (FF)	4 seats since 1981
23rd	1982 (Feb)	Donal Carey (FG)	Brendan Daly (FF)	Sylvester Barrett (FF)	Bill Loughnane (FF)	4 seats since 1981
24th	1982 (Nov)	Donal Carey (FG)	Brendan Daly (FF)	Sylvester Barrett (FF)	Madeleine Taylor-Quinn (FG)	4 seats since 1981
25th	1987	Donal Carey (FG)	Brendan Daly (FF)	Síle de Valera (FF)	Madeleine Taylor-Quinn (FG)	4 seats since 1981
26th	1989	Donal Carey (FG)	Brendan Daly (FF)	Síle de Valera (FF)	Madeleine Taylor-Quinn (FG)	4 seats since 1981
27th	1992	Donal Carey (FG)	Moosajee Bhamjee (Lab)	Síle de Valera (FF)	Tony Killeen (FF)	4 seats since 1981
28th	1997	Donal Carey (FG)	Brendan Daly (FF)	Síle de Valera (FF)	Tony Killeen (FF)	4 seats since 1981
29th	2002	Pat Breen (FG)	James Breen (Ind.)	Síle de Valera (FF)	Tony Killeen (FF)	4 seats since 1981
30th	2007	Pat Breen (FG)	Joe Carey (FG)	Timmy Dooley (FF)	Tony Killeen (FF)	4 seats since 1981
31st	2011	Pat Breen (FG)	Joe Carey (FG)	Timmy Dooley (FF)	Michael McNamara (Lab)	4 seats since 1981
32nd	2016	Pat Breen (FG)	Joe Carey (FG)	Timmy Dooley (FF)	Michael Harty (Ind.)	4 seats since 1981
33rd	2020	Violet-Anne Wynne (SF)	Joe Carey (FG)	Cathal Crowe (FF)	Michael McNamara (Ind.)	4 seats since 1981
34th	2024	Donna McGettigan (SF)	Joe Cooney (FG)	Cathal Crowe (FF)	Timmy Dooley (FF)	4 seats since 1981
