= Independents 4 Change =

Irish political party

- Founded: 2014
- Dissolved: 2026
- Ideology: Socialism; Anti-neoliberalism; Antimilitarism
- Political position: Left-wing

Independents 4 Change was an Irish political alliance, which was also registered as a political party, comprising several independent politicians. It had two MEPs in the Ninth European Parliament: Clare Daly and Mick Wallace.

== History ==
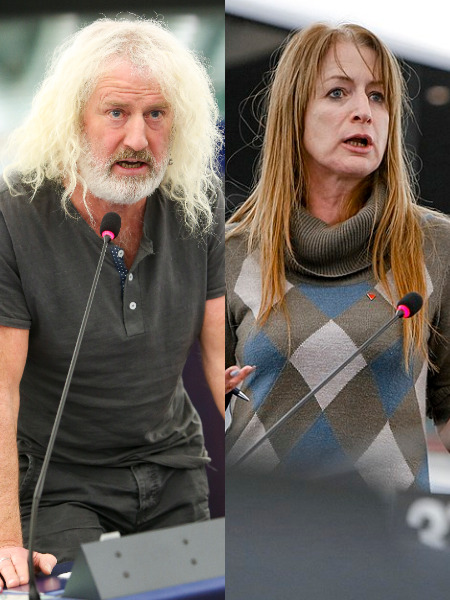
Mick Wallace and Clare Daly, who were elected as Independents 4 Change MEPs in 2019.

The political grouping registered as a political party in 2014. It was previously known as the "Independents for Equality" Movement.

Four candidates contested the 2014 local elections for the group in each of the local electoral areas in Wexford County Council. None of them were elected.

The party adopted its current name in September 2015, after the establishment of the Right2Change electoral alliance, to which its candidates in the 2016 general election subscribed.

Mick Wallace, Clare Daly, Joan Collins, Tommy Broughan, and councillor Barry Martin contested the 2016 general election for Independents 4 Change (I4C), with Broughan, Collins, Daly and Wallace being elected.

Within the 32nd Dáil, I4C took advantage of revised Dáil standing orders to form their own technical group, which also included three Independent TDs who were not members of the party itself: Catherine Connolly, Thomas Pringle, and Maureen O'Sullivan.

Tommy Broughan left the party on 26 July 2016. In 2016, Ruth Nolan, a member of South Dublin County Council for Lucan who had been elected for People Before Profit, joined Independents 4 Change.

At the 2019 European Parliament election, Clare Daly and Mick Wallace were elected as MEPs; they became part of The Left group in the European Parliament. Three councilors were elected for Independents 4 Change in the local elections held on the same day, including former Labour TD from Sligo, and longtime Independent Socialist councillor Declan Bree.

In the February 2020 general election, Independents 4 Change returned one TD, Joan Collins in Dublin South-Central. However, she soon left I4C to found a new party called Right to Change, leaving I4C with no TDs.

Neither Daly nor Wallace were re-elected in the 2024 European elections. Dean Mulligan was re-elected as a councillor for the Swords electoral area on Fingal County Council.

In addition to Mulligan, Wallace and Daly contested the 2024 Irish general election; None were elected.

In March 2026, Independents 4 Change requested that the organisation be removed from the register of political parties (meaning they would no longer be able to put candidates forward for election under the party's name).

== Election results ==
=== General elections ===
| Election | Seats won | ± | Position | First pref. votes | % | Government |
|---|---|---|---|---|---|---|
| 2016 | 4 / 158 | ▲4 | 6th | 31,365 | 1.5% | FG–Ind. with Fianna Fáil confidence & supply |
| 2020 | 1 / 160 | ▼3 | ▼9th | 8,421 | 0.4% | FF–FG–GP |
| 2024 | 0 / 174 | ▼1 | ▼14th | 5,166 | 0.2% | No seats |

=== Local elections ===
| Election | Seats won | ± | First pref. votes | % |
|---|---|---|---|---|
| 2014 | 0 / 949 | Steady | 1,828 | 0.1% |
| 2019 | 3 / 949 | ▲3 | 8,626 | 0.5% |
| 2024 | 1 / 949 | ▼2 | 3,537 | 0.2% |

=== European Parliament ===
| Election | Leader | 1st pref Votes | % | Seats | +/− | EP Group |
|---|---|---|---|---|---|---|
| 2019 | Collective leadership | 124,085 | 7.39% (#5) | 2 / 13 | New | The Left |
| 2024 | Collective leadership | 79,658 | 4.58% (#7) | 0 / 14 | ▼2 | − |
