= Right to Change =

Minor Irish political party

- Founder: Joan Collins
- Founded: May 2020
- Split from: Independents 4 Change
- Headquarters: Inchicore, Dublin
- Political position: Left-wing
- Local government: 1 / 949

Website
- righttochange.ie

Right to Change (also written as Right2Change or RTOC) is a minor left-wing political party in Ireland. It was founded in May 2020 by TD Joan Collins. Collins was elected as an Independents 4 Change TD in the 2020 general election; she had previously been a member of the Socialist Party. The party has invited trade unions to affiliate.

The party focuses on social and economic justice, grassroots activism, and progressive policies.

RTOC gained representation on Dublin City Council, after two former Independents 4 Change councillors, Sophie Nicoulland and Pat Dunne, joined the party. Only Dunne was re-elected at the 2024 local elections.

For the 2024 general election, Collins was the sole candidate to run for RTOC. She was not re-elected, leaving the party without national representation.

== Election results ==
=== Dáil Éireann ===
| Election | Leader | 1st pref votes | % | Seats | ± | Government |
|---|---|---|---|---|---|---|
| 2024 | Joan Collins | 2,907 | 0.13 (#16) | 0 / 174 | ▼1 | Extra-parliamentary |

=== Local elections ===
| Election | Seats won | ± | First pref. votes | % |
|---|---|---|---|---|
| 2024 | 1 / 949 | ▲1 | 2,639 | 0.1% |
