= Joan Collins (politician) =

Irish politician (born 1961)

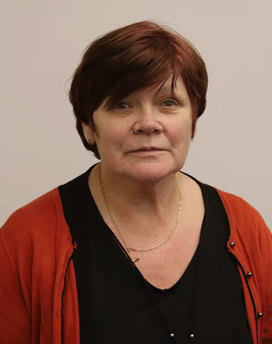
- Collins in 2020

Teachta Dála
- In office February 2011 – November 2024
- Constituency: Dublin South-Central

Personal details
- Born: 4 June 1961 (age 65) Drimnagh, Dublin, Ireland
- Party: Right to Change (2020–present)
- Other political affiliations: Independents 4 Change (2015–2020); United Left (2013–2015); People Before Profit (2007–2013); United Left Alliance; Socialist Party (1996–2004); Labour Party (until 1989)
- Spouse: Dermot Connolly
- Children: 2
- Website: joancollins.ie

Joan Collins (born 4 June 1961) is an Irish Right to Change politician who was a Teachta Dála (TD) for the Dublin South-Central constituency from 2011 to 2024.

== Dublin City Council ==
A post office clerk by profession, Collins was elected to Dublin City Council at the 2004 local elections for the Crumlin-Kimmage local electoral area. She was involved in the Anti-Bin Tax Campaign. She is a former member of the Socialist Party, having left along with her partner, the former secretary of the party, due to a dispute with the party leadership.

Her Community and Workers Action Group joined People Before Profit in 2007, and Collins was re-elected as a local councillor under their banner in 2009. During her tenure as a Councillor, she remained employed as a post office clerk.

As a councillor, Collins came to prominence on 27 January 2011, when she confronted Bertie Ahern on camera as he was being interviewed outside Leinster House, on the day Ahern retired from politics with a €150,000 a year pension as wages were being cut and taxes increased, with Collins asking the former Taoiseach if he had "no shame" and "How dare you?" Ahern ignored her and dismissed her as someone who had approached him "to try get themselves on television and radio", though Collins later said she had not seen the television cameras. She released a video in which she stated she had been annoyed by "the smug smile on his face and the way he was waffling on as if he hadn't got a care in the world". A year later she said she did not regret her action against Ahern, and said that Fianna Fáil had not approached her about the incident since her election to the Dáil.

== Dáil Éireann ==
Elections to the Dáil
Party	Election		FPv	FPv%	Result
Independent	Dublin South-Central	2007	2,203	4.6	Eliminated on count 7/10
People Before Profit	Dublin South-Central	2011	6,574	12.9	Elected on count 13/13
Inds. 4 Change	Dublin South-Central	2016	6,195	14.5	Elected on count 8/11
Inds. 4 Change	Dublin South-Central	2020	2,831	6.5	Elected on count 6/6
Right to Change	Dublin South-Central	2024	2,907	7.8	Eliminated on count 12/15

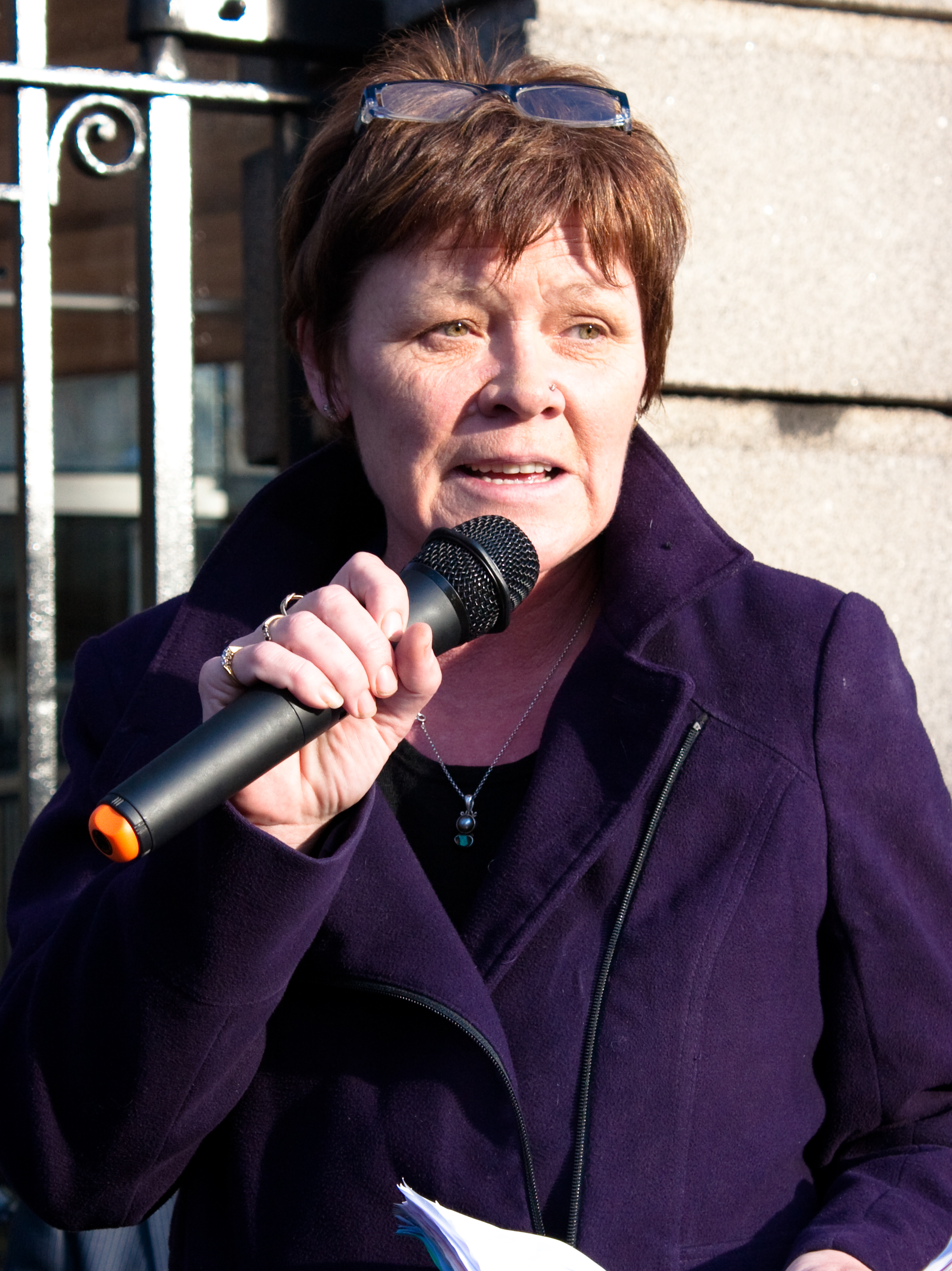
Collins in 2011

Collins contested the 2011 general election for the United Left Alliance, taking 12.9% of the first preference vote. She was elected on the final count without reaching the quota. She said the election should have been a referendum on the Finance Bill. In March 2011, due to the dual mandate rule, she was replaced on Dublin City Council by her party colleague Pat Dunne.

Collins supported the nomination of Senator David Norris for a place on the ballot paper ahead of the 2011 presidential election. She said that the people of Ireland should be allowed to decide Norris's suitability for the role.

In December 2011, she described the proposed household charge being brought in as part of the 2012 Irish budget as a "Trojan Horse". On 15 December 2011, she helped launch a nationwide campaign against the proposed household charge. In February 2012, she accompanied a collection of housing groups to Mountrath, County Laois, who successfully prevented the deputy sheriff and gardaí from evicting a man from his home. The man was ultimately evicted two weeks later, an action which Collins strongly condemned.

In December 2012, Collins named crime journalist Paul Williams and sports star Ronan O'Gara under Dáil privilege as being among those to benefit from having their penalty points cancelled by gardaí. Justice Minister Alan Shatter called Collins's action a "total disgrace" and she was reported to the Dáil Committee on Procedure and Privileges.

In April 2013, along with Clare Daly, she founded a new political party called United Left. As of December 2015, United Left was no longer on the register of political parties.

At the 2016 and 2020 general elections, she stood as an Independents 4 Change candidate, and was elected both times.

In May 2020, she left Independents 4 Change and founded a new party called Right to Change.

In February 2023, Collins was one of seven Dáil members who voted yes on a motion to amend the condemnation of the Russian invasion of Ukraine.

She lost her seat at the 2024 general election, being eliminated on the twelfth count. Following her defeat, Collins said that she would not stand for election again, but "will always be an activist".

Dáil	Election	Deputy (Party)	Deputy (Party)	Deputy (Party)	Deputy (Party)	Deputy (Party)
13th	1948	Seán Lemass (FF)	James Larkin Jnr (Lab)	Con Lehane (CnaP)	Maurice E. Dockrell (FG)	John McCann (FF)
14th	1951	Seán Lemass (FF)	James Larkin Jnr (Lab)	Philip Brady (FF)	Maurice E. Dockrell (FG)	John McCann (FF)
15th	1954	Seán Lemass (FF)	James Larkin Jnr (Lab)	Thomas Finlay (FG)	Maurice E. Dockrell (FG)	Celia Lynch (FF)
16th	1957	Seán Lemass (FF)	Jack Murphy (Ind.)	Philip Brady (FF)	Maurice E. Dockrell (FG)	Celia Lynch (FF)
16th	1958 by-election	Seán Lemass (FF)	Patrick Cummins (FF)	Philip Brady (FF)	Maurice E. Dockrell (FG)	Celia Lynch (FF)
17th	1961	Seán Lemass (FF)	Patrick Cummins (FF)	Philip Brady (FF)	Maurice E. Dockrell (FG)	Joseph Barron (CnaP)
18th	1965	Seán Lemass (FF)	Frank Cluskey (Lab)	Philip Brady (FF)	Maurice E. Dockrell (FG)	Thomas J. Fitzpatrick (FF)
19th	1969	Richie Ryan (FG)	Ben Briscoe (FF)	Philip Brady (FF)	John O'Donovan (Lab)	4 seats 1969–1977
20th	1973	Richie Ryan (FG)	Ben Briscoe (FF)	Philip Brady (FF)	John Kelly (FG)	4 seats 1969–1977
21st	1977	Fergus O'Brien (FG)	Frank Cluskey (Lab)	Thomas J. Fitzpatrick (FF)	3 seats 1977–1981	
22nd	1981	Fergus O'Brien (FG)	Ben Briscoe (FF)	Thomas J. Fitzpatrick (FF)	Gay Mitchell (FG)	John O'Connell (Note: O'Connell served as Ceann Comhairle in the 22nd and 23rd Dáil from 1981 to 1983 and was returned automatically at the February 1982 and November 1982 general elections. He joined Fianna Fáil in January 1985.) (Ind.)
23rd	1982 (Feb)	Frank Cluskey (Lab)	Ben Briscoe (FF)	Thomas J. Fitzpatrick (FF)	Gay Mitchell (FG)	John O'Connell (Ind.)
24th	1982 (Nov)	Frank Cluskey (Lab)	Ben Briscoe (FF)	Fergus O'Brien (FG)	Gay Mitchell (FG)	John O'Connell (Ind.)
25th	1987	Frank Cluskey (Lab)	Ben Briscoe (FF)	Fergus O'Brien (FG)	Gay Mitchell (FG)	Mary Mooney (FF)
26th	1989	John O'Connell (FF)	Ben Briscoe (FF)	Fergus O'Brien (FG)	Gay Mitchell (FG)	Eric Byrne (WP)
27th	1992	John O'Connell (FF)	Ben Briscoe (FF)	Pat Upton (Lab)	Gay Mitchell (FG)	4 seats 1992–2002
27th	1994 by-election	Eric Byrne (DL)	Ben Briscoe (FF)	Pat Upton (Lab)	Gay Mitchell (FG)	4 seats 1992–2002
28th	1997	Seán Ardagh (FF)	Ben Briscoe (FF)	Pat Upton (Lab)	Gay Mitchell (FG)	4 seats 1992–2002
28th	1999 by-election	Seán Ardagh (FF)	Ben Briscoe (FF)	Mary Upton (Lab)	Gay Mitchell (FG)	4 seats 1992–2002
29th	2002	Seán Ardagh (FF)	Aengus Ó Snodaigh (SF)	Mary Upton (Lab)	Gay Mitchell (FG)	Michael Mulcahy (FF)
30th	2007	Seán Ardagh (FF)	Aengus Ó Snodaigh (SF)	Mary Upton (Lab)	Catherine Byrne (FG)	Michael Mulcahy (FF)
31st	2011	Eric Byrne (Lab)	Aengus Ó Snodaigh (SF)	Joan Collins (PBP)	Catherine Byrne (FG)	Michael Conaghan (Lab)
32nd	2016	Bríd Smith (AAA–PBP)	Aengus Ó Snodaigh (SF)	Joan Collins (Note: Founded Right to Change in May 2020.) (I4C)	Catherine Byrne (FG)	4 seats from 2016
33rd	2020	Bríd Smith (S–PBP)	Aengus Ó Snodaigh (SF)	Joan Collins (I4C)	Patrick Costello (GP)	4 seats from 2016
34th	2024	Catherine Ardagh (FF)	Aengus Ó Snodaigh (SF)	Máire Devine (SF)	Jen Cummins (SD)	4 seats from 2016
