= Dublin County West =

Dáil constituency (1977–1981)

- Former Dáil constituency

Former constituency
- Created: 1977
- Abolished: 1981
- Seats: 3
- Local government areas: County Dublin; Dublin City; County Kildare

Dublin County West was a parliamentary constituency represented in Dáil Éireann, the lower house of the Irish parliament or Oireachtas from 1977 to 1981. The constituency elected 3 deputies (Teachtaí Dála, commonly known as TDs) to the Dáil, using proportional representation by means of the single transferable vote (PR-STV).

== History and boundaries ==
The constituency was created by the Electoral (Amendment) Act 1974, and used at the 1977 general election. It was abolished by the Electoral (Amendment) Act 1980. It largely became part of the new Dublin West constituency, first used at the 1981 general election.

It consisted of the following areas:

"In the administrative county of Dublin, the district electoral divisions of:

Blanchardstown, Castleknock, Clondalkin Number One, Clondalkin Number Two, Clonsilla,
Lucan Number One, Lucan Number Two, Newcastle, Palmerston Number One,
Palmerston Number Two, Rathcoole, Saggart, Terenure Number One;

and, in the administrative county of Kildare, the district electoral divisions of:

Celbridge, Donaghcumper, Leixlip, Maynooth, in the former Rural District of Celbridge No. 1;

and the following wards in the county borough of Dublin:

Ballyfermot H, Crumlin F."

== TDs ==
Teachtaí Dála (TDs) for Dublin County West 1977–1981
Key to parties: FF = Fianna Fáil; FG = Fine Gael
Dáil	Election	Deputy (Party)	Deputy (Party)	Deputy (Party)
21st	1977	Liam Lawlor (FF)	Brian Lenihan (FF)	Mark Clinton (FG)
22nd	1981	Constituency abolished		

Note: The columns in this table are used only for presentational purposes, and no significance should be attached to the order of columns. For details of the order in which seats were won at each election, see the detailed results of that election.

== 1977 general election ==
*: Outgoing TD

1977 general election: Dublin County West
Party	Candidate	FPv%	Count				
Party	Candidate	FPv%	1	2	3	4	5
Fianna Fáil	Brian Lenihan	27.6	10,010				
Fine Gael	Mark Clinton	20.0	7,255	7,276	8,339	8,851	9,222
Fianna Fáil	Liam Lawlor	17.5	6,328	6,960	7,090	7,350	11,389
Fianna Fáil	Terence Boylan	11.8	4,287	4,548	4,606	4,725	
Labour	Justin Keating	10.8	3,931	3,943	4,216	6,156	6,292
Labour	Joseph Connolly	7.6	2,769	2,778	2,922		
Fine Gael	Brian Fleming	4.6	1,683	1,692			
Electorate: 49,829 Valid: 36,263 Quota: 9,066 Turnout: 72.8%

== See also ==
- Dáil constituencies
- Politics of the Republic of Ireland
- Historic Dáil constituencies
- Elections in the Republic of Ireland
