= 1996 Dublin West by-election =

By-election to the 27th Dáil

- 2 April 1996
- Turnout: 28,410 (43.4%)
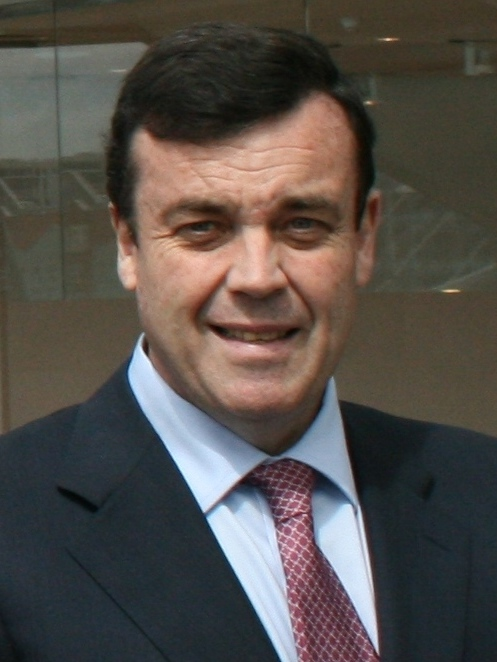

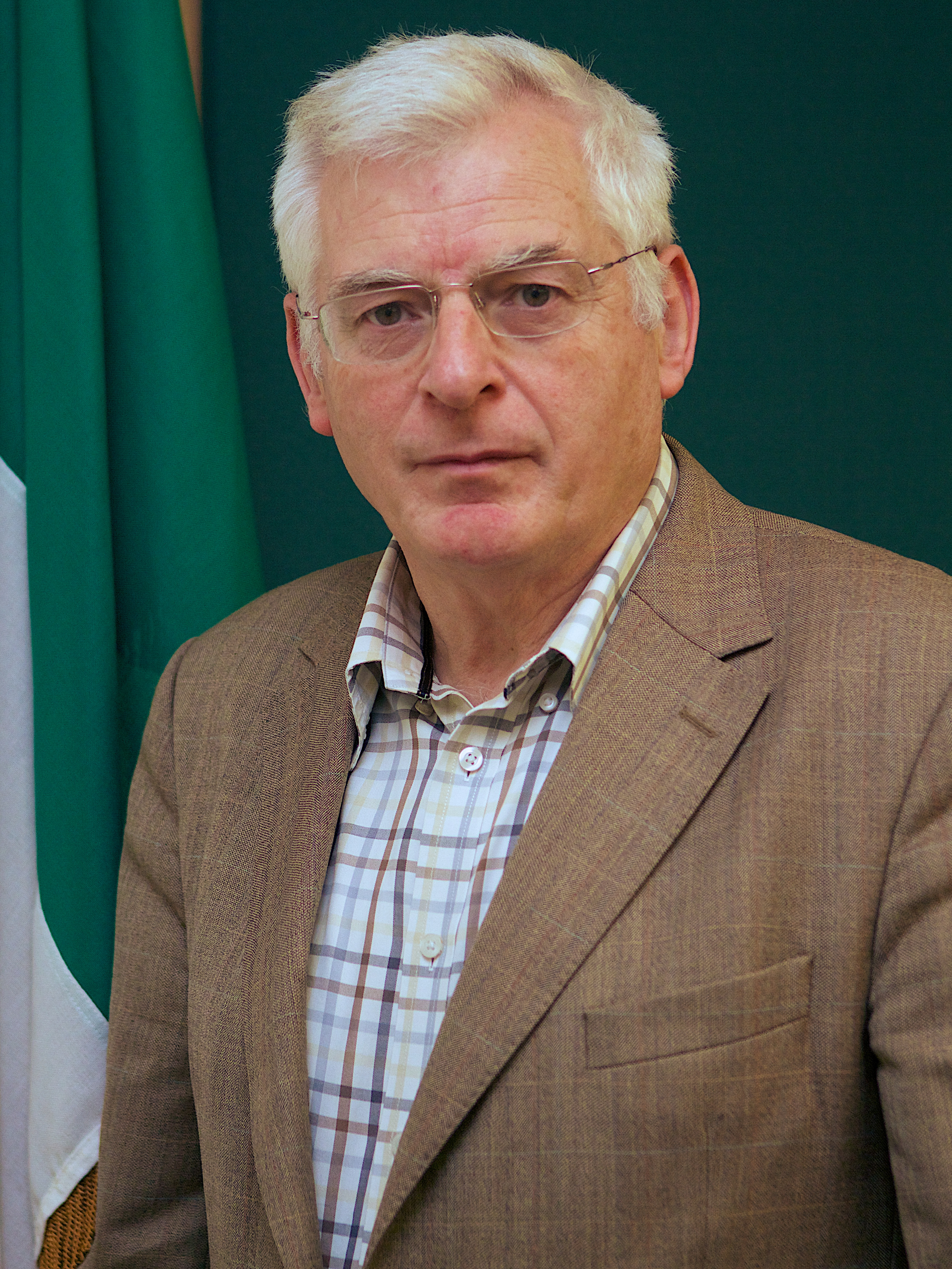
			Morrissey
Nominee	Brian Lenihan Jnr	Joe Higgins (Note: Higgins was a member of Militant Labour but appeared on the ballot as non-party.)	Tom Morrissey
Party	Fianna Fáil	Independent	Fine Gael
First preferences	6,995	6,743	3,728
Percentage	24.6%	23.7%	13.1%
Final count	11,754	11,384	–
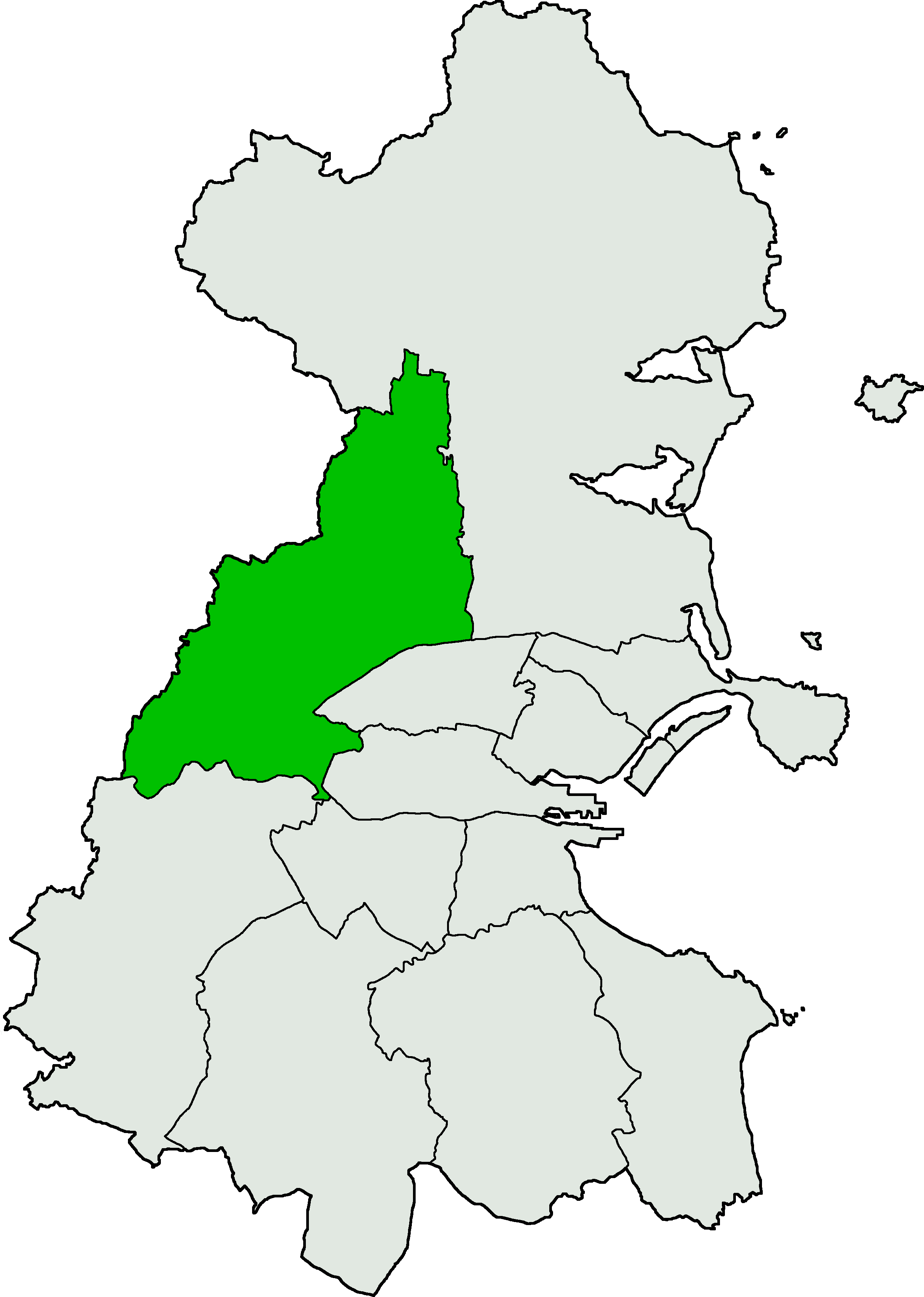
- Dublin West shown within County Dublin
TD before election
Brian Lenihan Snr
Fianna Fáil
TD after election
Brian Lenihan Jnr
Fianna Fáil

A Dáil by-election was held in the constituency of Dublin West in Ireland on Tuesday, 2 April 1996, to fill a vacancy in the 27th Dáil. It followed the death of Fianna Fáil Teachta Dála (TD) Brian Lenihan Snr on 1 November 1995.

The writ of election to fill the vacancy was agreed by the Dáil on 12 March 1996.

The by-election was won by the Fianna Fáil candidate Brian Lenihan Jnr, son of the deceased TD, Brian Lenihan Snr.

Among the candidates were Fingal County Councillors Joe Higgins, Tom Morrissey, Sheila Terry and Sean Lyons; Dublin City Councillors Tomás Mac Giolla and Vincent Jackson; and Paul Gogarty.

It was held on the same day as the 1996 Donegal North-East by-election. Both by-elections were won by Fianna Fáil candidates.

== Result ==
1996 Dublin West by-election
Party	Candidate	FPv%	Count										
Party	Candidate	FPv%	1	2	3	4	5	6	7	8	9	10	11
Fianna Fáil	Brian Lenihan Jnr	24.6	6,995	7,023	7,111	7,293	7,458	7,661	8,032	8,303	8,688	9,670	11,754
Independent	Joe Higgins	23.7	6,743	6,785	6,881	6,983	7,243	7,397	7,559	7,911	8,352	9,810	11,384
Fine Gael	Tom Morrissey	13.1	3,728	3,750	3,836	3,955	4,163	4,245	4,750	4,821	5,160	5,876	
Workers' Party	Tomás Mac Giolla	10.2	2,909	2,993	3,045	3,085	3,294	3,766	3,895	4,463	4,888		
Sinn Féin	John McCann	5.5	1,574	1,636	1,643	1,673	1,691	1,788	1,810				
Progressive Democrats	Sheila Terry	4.6	1,314	1,328	1,377	1,433	1,506	1,543					
Green	Paul Gogarty	4.5	1,286	1,311	1,356	1,483	1,576	1,692	1,899	2,041			
Independent	Vincent Jackson	4.0	1,131	1,186	1,195	1,247	1,290						
Labour	Michael O'Donovan	3.7	1,058	1,072	1,101	1,122							
Christian Solidarity	Gerard Casey	2.7	768	774	806								
Independent	Sean Lyons	1.8	514	524									
Independent	John O'Halloran	1.3	369										
Independent	Benny Cooney	0.1	21										
Electorate: 65,534 Valid: 28,410 Quota: 14,206 Turnout: 43.4%
