= Liam Lawlor =

Irish politician (1944–2005)

Teachta Dála
- In office February 1987 – May 2002
- In office February 1982 – November 1982
- Constituency: Dublin West
- In office June 1977 – June 1981
- Constituency: Dublin County West

Personal details
- Born: 19 October 1944 Crumlin, Dublin, Ireland
- Died: 22 October 2005 (aged 61) Moscow, Russia
- Party: Fianna Fáil (1974–2000); Independent (2000–2004)
- Spouse: Hazel Barber
- Children: 4

Liam Lawlor (19 October 1944 – 22 October 2005) was an Irish Fianna Fáil politician. He resigned from the party in 2000 following a finding by a party standards committee that he had failed to co-operate with its investigation into planning irregularities, and subsequently came into conflict with the Mahon Tribunal.

== Early life ==
Lawlor was born in Dublin in 1944. He grew up in Crumlin and was educated at Synge Street CBS and the College of Technology, Bolton Street (which became part of Dublin Institute of Technology and then Technological University Dublin). In his youth he played hurling and was on the Dublin minor and the Leinster Railway Cup hurling teams. After college he went into the refrigeration business, running his own company.

== Professional life ==
In 1974, he unsuccessfully stood as a candidate in the local elections to Dublin County Council. At the 1977 general election he was elected to Dáil Éireann as a Fianna Fáil Teachta Dála (TD) for the Dublin County West constituency. In 1979, he became a member of Dublin County Council.

At the 1981 general election he lost his Dáil seat in what was now the constituency of Dublin West, regained it in February 1982, but lost it again in the November 1982 general election. Lawlor regained his Dáil seat again at the 1987 general election, and was appointed Chairman of the Oireachtas Joint Committee on Commercial State-Sponsored Bodies. He resigned the position in 1989 due to his position as a non-executive director of Food Industries, a company that wished to acquire the Irish Sugar Company. In 1991 he lost his seat on Dublin City Council, and at the 1992 general election he nearly lost his Dáil seat to Tomás Mac Giolla of the Workers' Party. It is widely believed that Mac Giolla was cheated by Fianna Fáil in the election; the emergence of information that the since disgraced and jailed George Redmond was one of the local government officials who conducted the election count has added weight to this view.

Lawlor was one of a number of local councillors who were called as witnesses before the Mahon Tribunal investigating planning and payments in County Dublin. He admitted receiving sums of money from the lobbyist Frank Dunlop which he stated were political donations and not bribes.

Lawlor was also a European member of the controversial private political group, the Trilateral Commission.

== Corruption ==
In the light of allegations of planning corruption, Fianna Fáil established an internal committee on Standards in Public Life. The committee interviewed a number of party members, including Lawlor, but eventually found that Lawlor had failed to co-operate with it by not naming an individual who had furnished him with a donation. On the eve of publication of the committee report in June 2000, Lawlor resigned from the party; however he continued to support the government in Dáil Éireann. He did not stand at the 2002 general election. Lawlor appeared at the Flood Tribunal several times and was imprisoned on three occasions (in January 2001, January 2002 and February 2002, for a total of six weeks) in Mountjoy Prison for contempt of court arising from Orders of the High Court requiring him to co-operate with the tribunal. The final report of the Tribunal, eventually chaired by Justice Alan Mahon, was published on 22 March 2012.

On 7 February 2002 Lawlor was released from jail to make a Dáil appearance during which he ignored unprecedented all-party calls for his resignation. In what the Irish Independent described as "one of the most sensational days in the House", Lawlor was released temporarily by the High Court to mount his own defence during an hour-long debate. Taken into Leinster House in a prison van, Lawlor sat alone at the rear of the Chamber while the five party leaders, in turn, called on him to step down. Instead Lawlor made an aggressive defence of his own position during a 20-minute speech while making no reference at all to the unprecedented joint motion.

Taoiseach Bertie Ahern, said Lawlor had repeatedly let politics down and his position was untenable. Lawlor, he said, had been committed to prison three times and political life was "cheapened" by this. No vote was required as the decision to ask him to resign was unanimous. Lawlor was released by the High Court for about two hours on third day of his 28-day sentence for not co-operating with the Flood Tribunal. As the Dáil sat at 10.30am, Lawlor's legal advisers were petitioning the High Court to allow him make his own case to his fellow TDs. High Court president Justice Joseph Finnegan granted the request but laid down strict conditions on Lawlor's release, saying he was to be taken from Mountjoy to Leinster House, stay for the debate and then be returned to jail.

== Death ==
Lawlor was killed on 22 October 2005, when the Mercedes-Benz car he was being driven in on the way from Sheremetyevo International Airport crashed into a concrete street light on the Leningrad Shosse, the main road between Saint Petersburg and Moscow, twenty-three kilometres from Moscow. Lawlor had been travelling with Julia Kushnir, a Ukrainian legal assistant, aged 29, confirmed by the Lawlor family to be working as Lawlor's interpreter in Russia. She was injured in the crash that killed Lawlor. The driver, a Russian businessman, Ruslan Suleymanov, was fatally injured, when he swerved the car to avoid a man and a woman who ran out onto the road in front of it.

Lawlor's funeral was held in Lucan on 26 October 2005.

=== False media claims about the accident ===
The Russian police initially reported that the woman in Lawlor's car may have been a sixteen-year-old prostitute. The report was the lead in a number of Sunday newspapers. The Sunday Independent editor Aengus Fanning apologised to the Lawlor family for the report, following a public outcry on the reportage and condemnation of the publication from the National Union of Journalists. The Sunday Tribune, the Sunday World, The Observer, and a number of British tabloids also published the claim. The Observer initially refused to apologise for the error, but on the Tuesday following the accident, the newspaper issued a statement saying that "serious discrepancies" had arisen in the story it had published, and admitted that it had erred, removing the story from its website. The controversial nature of the coverage led to calls for a body to regulate and oversee standards in the Irish press similar to the Press Complaints Commission in the UK.

== See also ==
- List of members of the Oireachtas imprisoned since 1923

Dáil	Election	Deputy (Party)	Deputy (Party)	Deputy (Party)
21st	1977	Liam Lawlor (FF)	Brian Lenihan (FF)	Mark Clinton (FG)
22nd	1981	Constituency abolished		

Dáil	Election	Deputy (Party)	Deputy (Party)	Deputy (Party)	Deputy (Party)	Deputy (Party)
22nd	1981	Jim Mitchell (FG)	Brian Lenihan Snr (FF)	Richard Burke (FG)	Eileen Lemass (FF)	Brian Fleming (FG)
23rd	1982 (Feb)	Jim Mitchell (FG)	Brian Lenihan Snr (FF)	Richard Burke (FG)	Liam Lawlor (FF)	Brian Fleming (FG)
23rd	1982 by-election	Jim Mitchell (FG)	Brian Lenihan Snr (FF)	Liam Skelly (FG)	Liam Lawlor (FF)	Brian Fleming (FG)
24th	1982 (Nov)	Jim Mitchell (FG)	Brian Lenihan Snr (FF)	Liam Skelly (FG)	Eileen Lemass (FF)	Tomás Mac Giolla (WP)
25th	1987	Jim Mitchell (FG)	Brian Lenihan Snr (FF)	Pat O'Malley (PDs)	Liam Lawlor (FF)	Tomás Mac Giolla (WP)
26th	1989	Jim Mitchell (FG)	Brian Lenihan Snr (FF)	Austin Currie (FG)	Liam Lawlor (FF)	Tomás Mac Giolla (WP)
27th	1992	Joan Burton (Lab)	Brian Lenihan Snr (FF)	Austin Currie (FG)	Liam Lawlor (FF)	4 seats 1992–2002
27th	1996 by-election	Joan Burton (Lab)	Brian Lenihan Jnr (FF)	Austin Currie (FG)	Liam Lawlor (FF)	4 seats 1992–2002
28th	1997	Joe Higgins (SP)	Brian Lenihan Jnr (FF)	Austin Currie (FG)	Liam Lawlor (FF)	4 seats 1992–2002
29th	2002	Joe Higgins (SP)	Brian Lenihan Jnr (FF)	Joan Burton (Lab)	3 seats 2002–2011	
30th	2007	Leo Varadkar (FG)	Brian Lenihan Jnr (FF)	Joan Burton (Lab)	3 seats 2002–2011	
31st	2011	Leo Varadkar (FG)	Brian Lenihan Jnr (FF)	Joan Burton (Lab)	Joe Higgins (SP)	4 seats 2011–2024
31st	2011 by-election	Leo Varadkar (FG)	Patrick Nulty (Lab)	Joan Burton (Lab)	Joe Higgins (SP)	4 seats 2011–2024
31st	2014 by-election	Leo Varadkar (FG)	Ruth Coppinger (SP)	Joan Burton (Lab)	Joe Higgins (SP)	4 seats 2011–2024
32nd	2016	Leo Varadkar (FG)	Ruth Coppinger (AAA–PBP)	Joan Burton (Lab)	Jack Chambers (FF)	4 seats 2011–2024
33rd	2020	Leo Varadkar (FG)	Paul Donnelly (SF)	Roderic O'Gorman (GP)	Jack Chambers (FF)	4 seats 2011–2024
34th	2024	Emer Currie (FG)	Paul Donnelly (SF)	Roderic O'Gorman (GP)	Jack Chambers (FF)	Ruth Coppinger (PBP–S)
