= Dublin West =

Dáil constituency (1981–present)

- Dáil constituency
- Location of Dublin West within County Dublin
- Interactive map of constituency boundaries since the 2024 general election
- Major settlements: Ashtown; Blanchardstown; Castleknock; Clonsilla; Damastown; Hollystown; Huntstown and Littlepace; Mulhuddart; Ongar; Tyrrelstown

Current constituency
- Created: 1981
- Seats: 5 (1981–1992); 4 (1992–2002); 3 (2002–2011); 4 (2011–2024); 5 (2024–)
- TDs: Jack Chambers (FF); Ruth Coppinger (PBP–S); Emer Currie (FG); Paul Donnelly (SF); Roderic O'Gorman (GP)
- Local government areas: Fingal; Dublin City
- Created from: Dublin Ballyfermot; Dublin Cabra; Dublin County West; Dublin County North; Dublin South-Central
- EP constituency: Dublin

Dublin West is a parliamentary constituency represented in Dáil Éireann, the lower house of the Irish parliament or Oireachtas. The constituency elects five deputies (Teachtaí Dála, commonly known as TDs) on the system of proportional representation by means of the single transferable vote (PR-STV).

== Boundaries ==
The constituency includes Mulhuddart, Corduff, Blanchardstown, Castleknock, Carpenterstown, Barberstown, Clonsilla and Ongar. The portion in Dublin City includes Dublin Zoo and Áras an Uachtaráin, the official residence of the President of Ireland, and the suburb of Ashtown. The Electoral (Amendment) Act 2023 defines the constituency as:

"In the county of Fingal, the electoral divisions of:

Blanchardstown-Abbotstown, Blanchardstown-Blakestown, Blanchardstown-Coolmine, Blanchardstown-Corduff, Blanchardstown-Delwood, Blanchardstown-Mulhuddart, Blanchardstown-Roselawn, Blanchardstown-Tyrrelstown, Castleknock-Knockmaroon, Castleknock-Park, Lucan North, The Ward;

and, in the city of Dublin, the electoral divisions of:

Ashtown A, Ashtown B;
and that part of the electoral division of Phoenix Park situated north of a line drawn along Chapelizod Road, Conyngham Road and Parkgate Street."

Changes to the Dublin West constituency
Years	TDs	Boundaries	Notes
1981–1987	5	In the county borough of Dublin, the wards of Ballyfermot A, Ballyfermot B, Ballyfermot C, Ballyfermot D, Ballyfermot E, Ballyfermot F, Cabra West A (except the part in the constituency of Dublin Central), Cabra West C (except the part in the constituency of Dublin Central), Cabra West D, Cabra West E, Kilmainham A, Kilmainham B, Kilmainham C, Phoenix Park, Usher's A, Usher's F; and in the county of Dublin the district electoral divisions of Castleknock, Clonsilla, Lucan Number One, Lucan Number Two, Palmerstown Number One, Palmerstown Number Two; and the townlands of Abbotstown, Blanchardstown, Corduff, Deanestown, Dunsink, Huntstown (in the parish of Mulhuddart), Little Pace, Scribblestown, Sheephill, in the district electoral division of Blanchardstown; and the townland of Cardiffsbridge in the district electoral division of Finglas.	Transfer of Ballyfermot A, B, C, D, E and F, Kilmainham A and C from Dublin Ballyfermot; Transfer of Cabra West D and E, Phoenix Park and parts of Cabra West A and C from Dublin Cabra; Transfer of Castleknock, Clonsilla, Lucan Numbers One and Two, Palmerstown Numbers One and Two, and townlands in Blanchardstown from Dublin County West; Transfer of Kilmainham B, Usher's A, Usher's F from Dublin South-Central; Transfer of the townland of Cardiffsbridge from Dublin County North.
1987–1992	5	In the county borough of Dublin, the wards of Ballyfermot A, Ballyfermot B, Ballyfermot C, Ballyfermot D, Ballyfermot E, Ballyfermot F, Kilmainham A, Kilmainham B, Kilmainham C, Phoenix Park, Usher's A, Usher's F; and in the county of Dublin the district electoral divisions of Castleknock, Clonsilla, Lucan Number One, Lucan Number Two, Palmerstown Number One, Palmerstown Number Two; and the townlands of Abbotstown, Blanchardstown, Corduff, Deanestown, Dunsink, Huntstown (in the parish of Mulhuddart), Little Pace, Scribblestown, Sheephill, in the district electoral division of Blanchardstown; and the townland of Cardiffsbridge in the district electoral division of Finglas.	Transfer of the wards of Cabra West D and E and the balance of the wards of Cabra West A and C to Dublin Central.
1992–1997	4	In the county borough of Dublin, the wards of Cherry Orchard A, Cherry Orchard B, Cherry Orchard C, Drumfinn, Kylemore; and in the county of Dublin the district electoral divisions of Blanchardstown-Blakestown, Blanchardstown-Coolmine, Blanchardstown-Delwood, Blanchardstown-Roselawn, Castleknock-Knockmaroon, Clondalkin-Cappaghmore, Clondalkin-Moorfield, Clondalkin-Rowlagh, Lucan-Esker, Lucan Heights, Lucan North, Lucan-St. Helens, Palmerston Village, Palmerston West.	Transfer to Dublin North of the part of the constituency situated north of the Navan Road and the Castleknock Road; Transfer of the Ashtown, Phoenix Park, Islandbridge, Kilmainham, Inchicore, Ballyfermot (part) and Chapelizod areas to Dublin Central.
1997–2002	4	In the county of Fingal, the electoral divisions of Blanchardstown-Abbotstown, Blanchardstown-Blakestown, Blanchardstown-Coolmine, Blanchardstown-Corduff, Blanchardstown-Delwood, Blanchardstown-Mulhuddart, Blanchardstown-Roselawn, Blanchardstown-Tyrrelstown, Castleknock-Knockmaroon, Castleknock-Park and Lucan North; and in the county of South Dublin the electoral divisions of Clondalkin-Cappaghmore, Clondalkin-Moorfield, Clondalkin-Rowlagh, Lucan-Esker, Lucan Heights, Lucan-St. Helens, Palmerston Village, Palmerston West.	Transfer of Blanchardstown-Abbotstown, Blanchardstown-Corduff, Blanchardstown-Mulhuddart, Blanchardstown-Tyrrelstown, Castleknock Park from Dublin North; Cherry Orchard A, B and C, Drumfinn and Kylemore to Dublin Central
2002–2007	3	In the county of Fingal, the electoral divisions of Blanchardstown-Abbotstown, Blanchardstown-Blakestown, Blanchardstown-Coolmine, Blanchardstown-Corduff, Blanchardstown-Delwood, Blanchardstown-Mulhuddart, Blanchardstown-Roselawn, Blanchardstown-Tyrrelstown, Castleknock-Knockmaroon, Castleknock-Park and Lucan North; and in the county of South Dublin the electoral divisions of Palmerston Village, Palmerston West.	Transfer of Clondalkin-Cappaghmore, Clondalkin-Moorfield, Clondalkin-Rowlagh, Lucan-Esker, Lucan Heights, Lucan-St. Helens to Dublin Mid-West.
2007–2011	3	In the county of Fingal, the electoral divisions of Blanchardstown-Blakestown, Blanchardstown-Coolmine, Blanchardstown-Corduff, Blanchardstown-Delwood, Blanchardstown-Mulhuddart, Blanchardstown-Roselawn, Blanchardstown-Tyrrelstown, Castleknock-Knockmaroon, Castleknock-Park, Kilsallaghan and Lucan North; and those parts of the electoral divisions of Blanchardstown-Abbotstown, Dubber and The Ward situated north of a line drawn along the Northern Cross Route (M50).	Transfer of Palmerston Village and Palmerston West to Dublin Mid-West. Transfer of part of Blanchardstown-Abbotstown to Dublin North-West, and of Kilsallaghan and part of Dubber and The Ward from Dublin North.
2011–2016	3	In the county of Fingal, the electoral divisions of Blanchardstown-Blakestown, Blanchardstown-Coolmine, Blanchardstown-Corduff, Blanchardstown-Delwood, Blanchardstown-Mulhuddart, Blanchardstown-Roselawn, Blanchardstown-Tyrrelstown, Castleknock-Knockmaroon, Castleknock-Park, Kilsallaghan, Lucan North, Swords-Forrest; and those parts of the electoral divisions of Airport, Blanchardstown-Abbotstown, Dubber and The Ward situated north of a line drawn along the Northern Cross Route (M50).	Transfer of Airport (part north of M50) and Swords-Forrest from Dublin North.
2016–2024	4	In the county of Fingal, the electoral divisions of Blanchardstown-Blakestown, Blanchardstown-Coolmine, Blanchardstown-Corduff, Blanchardstown-Delwood, Blanchardstown-Mulhuddart, Blanchardstown-Roselawn, Blanchardstown-Tyrrelstown, Castleknock-Knockmaroon, Castleknock-Park, Lucan North; and those parts of the electoral divisions of Blanchardstown-Abbotstown, and The Ward situated north of a line drawn along the Northern Cross Route (M50); and, in the city of Dublin, the electoral divisions of: Ashtown A, Ashtown B; and that part of the electoral division of Phoenix Park situated north of a line drawn along Chapelizod Road, Conyngham Road and Parkgate Street.	Transfer of Airport (part north of M50), Dubber (part north of M50), Kilsallaghan and Swords-Forrest to Dublin Fingal. Transfer of Ashtown A, Ashtown B and part of Phoenix Park (that part of the electoral division of Phoenix Park situated north of a line drawn 469 along Chapelizod Road, Conyngham Road and Parkgate Street) from Dublin Central.
2024–	5	In the county of Fingal, the electoral divisions of Blanchardstown-Abbotstown, Blanchardstown-Blakestown, Blanchardstown-Coolmine, Blanchardstown-Corduff, Blanchardstown-Delwood, Blanchardstown-Mulhuddart, Blanchardstown-Roselawn, Blanchardstown-Tyrrelstown, Castleknock-Knockmaroon, Castleknock-Park, Lucan North, The Ward; and, in the city of Dublin, the electoral divisions of: Ashtown A, Ashtown B; and that part of the electoral division of Phoenix Park situated north of a line drawn along Chapelizod Road, Conyngham Road and Parkgate Street.	Transfer of Blanchardstown-Abbotstown (Part South of M50) and The Ward (Part South of M50) from Dublin North-West.

== TDs ==
Teachtaí Dála (TDs) for Dublin West 1981–
Key to parties: AAA–PBP = AAA–PBP; FF = Fianna Fáil; FG = Fine Gael; GP = Green; Lab = Labour; PBP–S = PBP–Solidarity; PDs = Progressive Democrats; SF = Sinn Féin; SP = Socialist Party; WP = Workers' Party
Dáil	Election	Deputy (Party)	Deputy (Party)	Deputy (Party)	Deputy (Party)	Deputy (Party)
22nd	1981	Jim Mitchell (FG)	Brian Lenihan Snr (FF)	Richard Burke (FG)	Eileen Lemass (FF)	Brian Fleming (FG)
23rd	1982 (Feb)	Jim Mitchell (FG)	Brian Lenihan Snr (FF)	Richard Burke (FG)	Liam Lawlor (FF)	Brian Fleming (FG)
23rd	1982 by-election	Jim Mitchell (FG)	Brian Lenihan Snr (FF)	Liam Skelly (FG)	Liam Lawlor (FF)	Brian Fleming (FG)
24th	1982 (Nov)	Jim Mitchell (FG)	Brian Lenihan Snr (FF)	Liam Skelly (FG)	Eileen Lemass (FF)	Tomás Mac Giolla (WP)
25th	1987	Jim Mitchell (FG)	Brian Lenihan Snr (FF)	Pat O'Malley (PDs)	Liam Lawlor (FF)	Tomás Mac Giolla (WP)
26th	1989	Jim Mitchell (FG)	Brian Lenihan Snr (FF)	Austin Currie (FG)	Liam Lawlor (FF)	Tomás Mac Giolla (WP)
27th	1992	Joan Burton (Lab)	Brian Lenihan Snr (FF)	Austin Currie (FG)	Liam Lawlor (FF)	4 seats 1992–2002
27th	1996 by-election	Joan Burton (Lab)	Brian Lenihan Jnr (FF)	Austin Currie (FG)	Liam Lawlor (FF)	4 seats 1992–2002
28th	1997	Joe Higgins (SP)	Brian Lenihan Jnr (FF)	Austin Currie (FG)	Liam Lawlor (FF)	4 seats 1992–2002
29th	2002	Joe Higgins (SP)	Brian Lenihan Jnr (FF)	Joan Burton (Lab)	3 seats 2002–2011	
30th	2007	Leo Varadkar (FG)	Brian Lenihan Jnr (FF)	Joan Burton (Lab)	3 seats 2002–2011	
31st	2011	Leo Varadkar (FG)	Brian Lenihan Jnr (FF)	Joan Burton (Lab)	Joe Higgins (SP)	4 seats 2011–2024
31st	2011 by-election	Leo Varadkar (FG)	Patrick Nulty (Lab)	Joan Burton (Lab)	Joe Higgins (SP)	4 seats 2011–2024
31st	2014 by-election	Leo Varadkar (FG)	Ruth Coppinger (SP)	Joan Burton (Lab)	Joe Higgins (SP)	4 seats 2011–2024
32nd	2016	Leo Varadkar (FG)	Ruth Coppinger (AAA–PBP)	Joan Burton (Lab)	Jack Chambers (FF)	4 seats 2011–2024
33rd	2020	Leo Varadkar (FG)	Paul Donnelly (SF)	Roderic O'Gorman (GP)	Jack Chambers (FF)	4 seats 2011–2024
34th	2024	Emer Currie (FG)	Paul Donnelly (SF)	Roderic O'Gorman (GP)	Jack Chambers (FF)	Ruth Coppinger (PBP–S)

Note: The columns in this table are used only for presentational purposes, and no significance should be attached to the order of columns. For details of the order in which seats were won at each election, see the detailed results of that election.

== Elections ==
*: Outgoing TD

=== 2024 general election ===
2024 general election: Dublin West
Party	Candidate	FPv%	Count												
Party	Candidate	FPv%	1	2	3	4	5	6	7	8	9	10	11	12	13
Fianna Fáil	Jack Chambers	21.4	9,446												
Sinn Féin	Paul Donnelly	17.5	7,731												
Fine Gael	Emer Currie	15.4	6,791	7,579											
PBP–Solidarity	Ruth Coppinger (Note: Coppinger is a member of Solidarity.)	8.0	3,552	3,639	3,666	3,758	3,764	3,803	3,949	4,037	4,142	4,494	5,211	6,340	7,165
Green	Roderic O'Gorman	6.6	2,909	3,074	3,078	3,124	3,176	3,188	3,207	3,468	3,491	3,652	3,777	4,350	6,080
Labour	John Walsh	5.6	2,455	2,573	2,579	2,624	2,655	2,684	2,723	2,960	2,982	3,170	3,299	4,039	
Aontú	Ellen Troy	5.6	2,453	2,532	2,542	2,577	2,590	2,732	2,842	2,980	3,657	4,000	4,348	4,547	5,003
Social Democrats	Ellen Murphy	4.9	2,168	2,198	2,211	2,236	2,244	2,272	2,322	2,385	2,419	2,659	3,094		
Sinn Féin	Breda Hanaphy	3.5	1,567	1,599	1,861	1,902	1,906	1,949	2,117	2,168	2,345	2,573			
Independent	Tania Doyle	3.0	1,339	1,391	1,405	1,442	1,448	1,564	1,780	1,855	2,086				
National Party	Patrick Quinlan	2.6	1,149	1,156	1,161	1,192	1,193	1,491	1,632	1,658					
Independent	Natalie Treacy	2.2	969	988	998	1,006	1,006	1,099							
Independent	Susanne Delaney	1.8	816	832	836	875	877								
Fianna Fáil	Lorna Nolan	0.9	412	1,071	1,072	1,108	1,191	1,216	1,247						
Independent	Umar Al-Qadri	0.7	381	397	398										
Independent	John Forde	0.2	98	103	104										
Electorate: 78,034 Valid: 44,236 Spoilt: 357 Quota: 7,373 Turnout: 57.1%

=== 2020 general election ===
2020 general election: Dublin West
Party	Candidate	FPv%	Count					
Party	Candidate	FPv%	1	2	3	4	5	6
Sinn Féin	Paul Donnelly	28.6	12,456					
Fine Gael	Leo Varadkar	19.4	8,478	8,596	8,641	8,706	8,763	
Fianna Fáil	Jack Chambers	15.8	6,892	7,187	7,330	7,385	7,836	9,107
Green	Roderic O'Gorman	11.2	4,901	5,371	5,471	5,919	6,270	8,260
Solidarity–PBP	Ruth Coppinger (Note: Coppinger was a member of Solidarity.)	10.0	4,353	6,212	6,430	6,808	6,991	7,580
Labour	Joan Burton	4.8	2,096	2,201	2,236	2,321	2,406	
Fine Gael	Emer Currie	4.3	1,870	1,905	1,947	1,980	2,030	
Aontú	Edward Mac Manus	2.4	1,062	1,218	1,420	1,522		
Social Democrats	Aengus Ó Maoláin	1.9	817	1,114	1,249			
Independent	Peter Casey	1.1	495	708				
Independent	Stephen O'Loughlin	0.4	184	325				
Independent	Sean O'Leary	0.1	24	65				
Electorate: 70,337 Valid: 43,628 Spoilt: 270 (0.6%) Quota: 8,726 Turnout: 43,898 (62.4%)

=== 2016 general election ===
2016 general election: Dublin West
Party	Candidate	FPv%	Count				
Party	Candidate	FPv%	1	2	3	4	5
Fine Gael	Leo Varadkar	19.7	8,247	8,328	9,021		
Fianna Fáil	Jack Chambers	16.5	6,917	7,148	7,236	7,330	8,315
AAA–PBP	Ruth Coppinger	15.5	6,520	6,626	6,690	7,011	8,548
Labour	Joan Burton	15.4	6,445	6,508	6,668	6,769	8,009
Sinn Féin	Paul Donnelly	14.4	6,034	6,073	6,093	6,188	7,091
Independent	David McGuinness	7.1	2,991	3,081	3,112	3,405	
Green	Roderic O'Gorman	4.1	1,730	1,839	1,864	2,098	
Independent	T J Clare	2.6	1,092	1,191	1,214		
Fine Gael	Catherine Noone	2.6	1,074	1,125			
Renua	Jo O'Brien	1.6	677				
Independent	Dermot Casey	0.5	225				
Electorate: 64,639 Valid: 41,952 Spoilt: 320 (0.8%) Quota: 8,391 Turnout: 42,272 (65.4%)

=== 2014 by-election ===
Independent TD Patrick Nulty resigned on 24 March 2014. A by-election was held to fill the vacancy on 23 May 2014, on the same day as the 2014 European and local elections.

2014 by-election: Dublin West
Party	Candidate	FPv%	Count					
Party	Candidate	FPv%	1	2	3	4	5	6
Sinn Féin	Paul Donnelly	20.9	6,056	6,120	6,296	6,516	7,028	
Socialist Party	Ruth Coppinger	20.6	5,977	6,112	6,744	7,342	8,807	12,334
Fianna Fáil	David McGuinness	17.5	5,053	5,156	5,691	6,789	8,163	9,237
Independent	David Hall	13.1	3,803	4,133	4,783	5,846		
Fine Gael	Eamonn Coghlan	12.8	3,715	3,788	4,693			
Green	Roderic O'Gorman	6.4	1,856	1,951				
Labour	Lorraine Mulligan	5.2	1,505	1,540				
Independent	Seán Lyons	2.2	649					
Independent	John Kidd	0.8	228					
Fís Nua	Daniel Boyne	0.4	113					
Electorate: 63,521 Valid: 28,955 Spoilt: 395 (1.4%) Quota: 14,478 Turnout: 29,350 (46.2%)

=== 2011 by-election ===
Fianna Fáil TD Brian Lenihan Jnr died on 10 June 2011. A by-election was held to fill the vacancy on 27 October 2011, on the same day as the Irish presidential election and two constitutional referendums.

2011 by-election: Dublin West
Party	Candidate	FPv%	Count				
Party	Candidate	FPv%	1	2	3	4	5
Labour	Patrick Nulty	24.3	8,665	8,885	10,186	13,027	17,636
Fianna Fáil	David McGuinness	21.7	7,742	7,935	8,720	9,873	11,590
Socialist Party	Ruth Coppinger	21.1	7,542	7,834	9,368	9,873	
Fine Gael	Eithne Loftus	14.7	5,263	5,410	5,942		
Sinn Féin	Paul Donnelly	8.9	3,173	3,309			
Green	Roderic O'Gorman	5.0	1,787	1,925			
Independent	Barry Caesar Hunt	2.2	775				
Independent	John Frank Kidd	0.9	311				
Independent	Gary Bermingham	0.5	185				
Independent	Brendan Doris	0.3	95				
Independent	Jim Tallon	0.2	73				
Independent	Benny Cooney	0.1	51				
Independent	Peadar Ó Ceallaigh	0.1	40				
Electorate: 62,396 Valid: 35,702 Spoilt: 689 (1.9%) Quota: 17,852 Turnout: 36,391 (58.3%)

=== 2011 general election ===
2011 general election: Dublin West
Party	Candidate	FPv%	Count				
Party	Candidate	FPv%	1	2	3	4	5
Labour	Joan Burton	22.7	9,627				
Fine Gael	Leo Varadkar	19.7	8,359	8,555			
Socialist Party	Joe Higgins (Note: Higgins campaigned as a member of the United Left Alliance.)	19.0	8,084	8,304	8,603		
Fianna Fáil	Brian Lenihan Jnr	15.1	6,421	6,494	7,050	7,323	8,289
Fine Gael	Kieran Dennison	7.5	3,190	3,248	3,440	3,693	
Labour	Patrick Nulty	6.3	2,686	3,186	3,450	4,701	6,329
Sinn Féin	Paul Donnelly	6.1	2,597	2,646	2,749		
Fianna Fáil	David McGuinness	1.5	623	631			
Green	Roderic O'Gorman	1.4	605	625			
Independent	Clement Esebamen	0.7	280	288			
Electorate: 62,348 Valid: 42,472 Spoilt: 327 (0.8%) Quota: 8,495 Turnout: 42,799 (68.6%)

=== 2007 general election ===
2007 general election: Dublin West
Party	Candidate	FPv%	Count				
Party	Candidate	FPv%	1	2	3	4	5
Fianna Fáil	Brian Lenihan Jnr	32.7	11,125				
Fine Gael	Leo Varadkar	20.4	6,928	7,199	7,360	7,753	8,710
Labour	Joan Burton	17.1	5,799	6,101	6,215	6,673	7,905
Socialist Party	Joe Higgins	14.9	5,066	5,270	5,325	5,607	7,472
Sinn Féin	Felix Gallagher	4.8	1,624	1,677	1,683	1,777	
Fianna Fáil	Gerry Lynam	4.7	1,601	3,214	3,455	3,587	
Green	Roderic O'Gorman	3.8	1,286	1,349	1,417		
Progressive Democrats	Mags Murray	1.6	553	676			
Electorate: 52,193 Valid: 33,982 Spoilt: 206 (0.6%) Quota: 8,496 Turnout: 34,188 (65.5%)

=== 2002 general election ===
2002 general election: Dublin West
Party	Candidate	FPv%	Count					
Party	Candidate	FPv%	1	2	3	4	5	6
Fianna Fáil	Brian Lenihan Jnr	26.9	8,086					
Socialist Party	Joe Higgins	21.5	6,442	6,660	6,731	7,853		
Labour	Joan Burton	12.7	3,810	4,020	4,079	4,375	5,125	6,300
Fine Gael	Sheila Terry	12.3	3,694	3,783	3,829	3,982	4,863	5,669
Sinn Féin	Mary Lou McDonald	8.0	2,404	2,498	2,524			
Progressive Democrats	Tom Morrissey	7.9	2,370	2,480	2,554	2,662		
Fianna Fáil	Deirdre Doherty Ryan	7.7	2,300	2,386	2,698	3,056	3,728	
Green	Robert Bonnie	2.5	748					
Christian Solidarity	John Smyth	0.5	134					
Electorate: 53,780 Valid: 29,988 Spoilt: N/A Quota: 7,498 Turnout: 29,988 (55.8%)

=== 1997 general election ===
1997 general election: Dublin West
Party	Candidate	FPv%	Count								
Party	Candidate	FPv%	1	2	3	4	5	6	7	8	9
Fianna Fáil	Brian Lenihan Jnr	17.1	6,842	6,919	6,976	7,028	7,209	7,488	8,544		
Socialist Party	Joe Higgins	16.2	6,496	6,616	6,886	6,960	7,285	8,094			
Fine Gael	Austin Currie	13.1	5,256	5,330	5,397	6,335	6,663	6,764	6,942	7,645	7,698
Labour	Joan Burton	12.1	4,853	4,941	5,116	5,429	5,851	6,077	6,186	6,802	6,852
Fianna Fáil	Liam Lawlor	10.6	4,241	4,271	4,360	4,387	4,497	4,838	5,674	7,371	7,797
Progressive Democrats	Tom Morrissey	7.6	3,050	3,133	3,168	3,241	3,439	3,533	3,767		
Fianna Fáil	Finbarr Hanrahan	5.5	2,216	2,246	2,273	2,302	2,457	2,564			
Sinn Féin	John McCann	5.0	2,004	2,035	2,246	2,257	2,348				
Green	Paul Gogarty	4.3	1,732	1,799	1,926	2,011					
Fine Gael	Joanne Harmon	3.8	1,532	1,586	1,622						
Workers' Party	Tomás Mac Giolla	2.8	1,135	1,157							
Independent	Seán Lyons	1.5	585								
Independent	Colin Butler	0.2	96								
Independent	Ciara Malone	0.1	36								
Electorate: 66,419 Valid: 40,074 Spoilt: 223 (0.6%) Quota: 8,015 Turnout: 40,297 (60.7%)

=== 1996 by-election ===
Fianna Fáil TD Brian Lenihan Snr died on 1 November 1995. A by-election to fill the vacancy was held on 2 April 1996. The seat was won by the Fianna Fáil candidate Brian Lenihan Jnr, son of the deceased TD.

1996 by-election: Dublin West
Party	Candidate	FPv%	Count										
Party	Candidate	FPv%	1	2	3	4	5	6	7	8	9	10	11
Fianna Fáil	Brian Lenihan Jnr	24.6	6,995	7,023	7,111	7,293	7,458	7,661	8,032	8,303	8,688	9,670	11,754
Independent	Joe Higgins (Note: Joe Higgins was an Independent candidate in 1996, as part of the Militant Labour organisation.)	23.7	6,743	6,785	6,881	6,983	7,243	7,397	7,559	7,911	8,352	9,810	11,384
Fine Gael	Tom Morrissey	13.1	3,728	3,750	3,836	3,955	4,163	4,245	4,750	4,821	5,160	5,876	
Workers' Party	Tomás Mac Giolla	10.2	2,909	2,993	3,045	3,085	3,294	3,766	3,895	4,463	4,888		
Sinn Féin	John McCann	5.5	1,574	1,636	1,643	1,673	1,691	1,788	1,810				
Progressive Democrats	Sheila Terry	4.6	1,314	1,328	1,377	1,433	1,506	1,543					
Green	Paul Gogarty	4.5	1,286	1,311	1,356	1,483	1,576	1,692	1,899	2,041			
Independent	Vincent Jackson	4.0	1,131	1,186	1,195	1,247	1,290						
Labour	Michael O'Donovan	3.7	1,058	1,072	1,101	1,122							
Christian Solidarity	Gerard Casey	2.7	768	774	806								
Independent	Sean Lyons	1.8	514	524									
Independent	John O'Halloran	1.3	369										
Independent	Benny Cooney	0.1	21										
Electorate: 65,534 Valid: 28,410 Quota: 14,206 Turnout: 43.4%

=== 1992 general election ===
1992 general election: Dublin West
Party	Candidate	FPv%	Count													
Party	Candidate	FPv%	1	2	3	4	5	6	7	8	9	10	11	12	13	14
Labour	Joan Burton	22.6	8,398													
Fianna Fáil	Brian Lenihan Snr	13.9	5,171	5,210	5,215	5,242	5,349	5,395	5,450	5,653	5,826	6,052	6,337	6,590	8,007	
Fianna Fáil	Liam Lawlor	10.1	3,736	3,765	3,772	3,828	3,854	3,904	4,030	4,087	4,126	4,258	4,365	4,605	5,655	6,097
Fine Gael	Austin Currie	9.0	3,360	3,551	3,559	3,821	3,930	4,067	4,088	4,273	5,146	5,329	6,444	6,724	7,155	7,226
Fianna Fáil	Finbarr Hanrahan	7.3	2,727	2,759	2,765	2,785	2,836	2,947	2,984	3,068	3,127	3,184	3,357	3,460		
Workers' Party	Tomás Mac Giolla	7.3	2,726	2,915	2,929	3,025	3,070	3,238	3,550	3,652	3,700	4,287	4,483	5,814	5,984	6,047
Independent	Vincent Ballyfermot Jackson	5.8	2,171	2,233	2,248	2,296	2,311	2,412	2,640	2,706	2,726	3,001	3,115			
Progressive Democrats	Sheila Terry	4.0	1,498	1,583	1,591	1,678	1,781	1,893	1,904	2,090	2,385	2,478				
Independent	Joe Higgins	3.8	1,407	1,500	1,505	1,523	1,555	1,645	1,741	1,891	1,933					
Fine Gael	Tom Morrissey	3.2	1,179	1,220	1,222	1,360	1,583	1,615	1,628	1,731						
Sinn Féin	John McCann	2.8	1,032	1,045	1,054	1,094	1,106	1,126								
Independent	Seán Lyons	2.8	1,027	1,070	1,078	1,084	1,186	1,278	1,322							
Green	Paul Nicholas Gogarty	2.4	906	979	984	999	1,090									
Independent	Marie Blake	2.5	916	948	952	965										
Fine Gael	Therese Ridge	2.2	799	835	840											
Independent	Liam Lynch	0.3	99	108												
Electorate: 57,955 Valid: 37,152 Spoilt: 519 (1.4%) Quota: 7,431 Turnout: 37,671 (65.0%)

=== 1989 general election ===
1989 general election: Dublin West
Party	Candidate	FPv%	Count											
Party	Candidate	FPv%	1	2	3	4	5	6	7	8	9	10	11	12
Fianna Fáil	Brian Lenihan Snr	23.1	11,109											
Workers' Party	Tomás Mac Giolla	17.1	8,218											
Fine Gael	Jim Mitchell	14.4	6,920	7,067	7,084	7,118	7,145	7,306	7,411	7,632	8,666			
Fine Gael	Austin Currie	10.2	4,886	5,000	5,006	5,018	5,023	5,055	5,098	5,417	6,461	7,901	8,475	
Fianna Fáil	Liam Lawlor	8.6	4,144	5,504	5,514	5,528	5,544	5,573	5,662	5,813	5,977	6,348	6,390	6,469
Fianna Fáil	Olga Bennett	8.2	3,924	5,240	5,245	5,255	5,276	5,333	5,414	5,678	5,835	6,201	6,246	6,396
Progressive Democrats	Pat O'Malley	5.4	2,572	2,628	2,634	2,647	2,652	2,694	2,734	3,005				
Labour	Eamon Tuffy	4.3	2,063	2,092	2,126	2,189	2,220	2,370	2,567	3,360	3,707			
Green	Bridin O'Connor	4.0	1,915	1,965	2,003	2,031	2,070	2,182	2,484					
Sinn Féin	John David McCann	1.8	853	867	889	905	1,301	1,364						
Democratic Socialist	Michael Conaghan	1.4	668	676	703	716	735							
Sinn Féin	Ursula Quinn	1.1	545	553	593	603								
Communist	John Montgomery	0.4	209	211										
Electorate: 77,766 Valid: 48,026 Quota: 8,005 Turnout: 61.8%

=== 1987 general election ===
1987 general election: Dublin West
Party	Candidate	FPv%	Count																
Party	Candidate	FPv%	1	2	3	4	5	6	7	8	9	10	11	12	13	14	15	16	17
Fianna Fáil	Brian Lenihan Snr	16.0	8,278	8,284	8,285	8,289	8,296	8,343	8,358	8,384	8,455	8,474	8,597	8,650					
Fianna Fáil	Liam Lawlor	13.6	7,020	7,024	7,024	7,035	7,047	7,079	7,091	7,110	7,164	7,169	7,267	7,315	7,583	7,736	7,779	7,971	8,112
Workers' Party	Tomás Mac Giolla	12.9	6,651	6,653	6,658	6,724	6,765	6,799	6,918	7,132	7,232	7,247	7,639	8,220	8,854				
Fine Gael	Jim Mitchell	12.7	6,585	6,586	6,587	6,598	6,639	6,658	6,687	6,780	6,848	7,132	7,182	7,315	7,647	7,922	7,964	11,843	
Fianna Fáil	Olga Bennett	10.9	5,622	5,623	5,626	5,635	5,669	5,697	5,723	5,770	5,828	5,842	5,958	6,008	6,203	6,332	6,370	6,475	6,565
Fine Gael	Brian Fleming	7.8	4,011	4,012	4,012	4,014	4,021	4,038	4,077	4,095	4,162	4,617	4,635	4,799	5,044	5,467	5,508		
Progressive Democrats	Pat O'Malley	6.4	3,308	3,310	3,311	3,315	3,327	3,334	3,375	3,408	3,452	3,501	3,512	3,605	3,861	5,902	5,973	6,924	9,744
Progressive Democrats	James Fay	5.2	2,706	2,708	2,708	2,709	2,711	2,731	2,754	2,805	2,896	2,958	2,984	3,028	3,213				
Independent	Liam Skelly	3.4	1,734	1,739	1,741	1,749	1,761	1,782	1,845	1,890	2,000	2,021	2,133	2,326					
Labour	Eamon Tuffy	2.3	1,185	1,187	1,190	1,208	1,217	1,221	1,306	1,367	1,406	1,414	1,448						
Sinn Féin	James Delaney	2.0	1,041	1,041	1,045	1,097	1,104	1,115	1,140	1,176	1,195	1,196							
Fine Gael	Eithne Loftus	1.7	860	861	862	862	864	870	906	910	943								
Independent	Seán Lyons	1.3	675	678	678	680	700	752	798	815									
Democratic Socialist	Michael Conaghan	1.2	600	602	602	612	637	641	690										
Green	Brídín O'Connor	1.1	587	593	599	609	611	620											
Independent	Gerry Gallagher	0.6	312	313	313	314	319												
Independent	Brian McMenamy	0.5	239	241	241	244													
Communist	John Montgomery	0.4	183	183	225														
Communist	Jean Roche	0.1	72	72															
Independent	Barbara Hyland	0.1	43																
Electorate: 75,366 Valid: 51,712 Quota: 8,619 Turnout: 68.6%

=== November 1982 general election ===
November 1982 general election: Dublin West
Party	Candidate	FPv%	Count							
Party	Candidate	FPv%	1	2	3	4	5	6	7	8
Fine Gael	Jim Mitchell	16.0	7,426	7,447	7,512	7,568	7,841			
Fine Gael	Liam Skelly	14.8	6,876	6,883	6,925	6,953	7,240	7,352	7,384	7,597
Workers' Party	Tomás Mac Giolla	14.7	6,844	6,954	7,136	7,177	7,877			
Fianna Fáil	Eileen Lemass	14.1	6,544	6,558	6,592	6,952	7,041	9,442		
Fine Gael	Brian Fleming	12.5	5,804	5,806	5,839	5,859	6,327	6,502	6,557	6,836
Fianna Fáil	Brian Lenihan Snr	11.7	5,464	5,472	5,481	5,772	5,815	7,331	8,924	
Fianna Fáil	Liam Lawlor	8.7	4,055	4,056	4,071	4,249	4,300			
Labour	Michael Brennan	3.9	1,835	1,873	1,995	2,004				
Fianna Fáil	Seán Sherwin	2.1	983	990	998					
Democratic Socialist	Michael Conaghan	1.0	476	517						
Independent	John Montgomery	0.6	259							
Electorate: 70,203 Valid: 46,566 Quota: 7,762 Turnout: 66.3%

=== 1982 by-election ===
Fine Gael TD Richard Burke resigned from the Dáil following his nomination by the Fianna Fáil government as European Commissioner. The by-election was held on 25 May 1982 and was won by Fine Gael candidate Liam Skelly.

1982 by-election: Dublin West
Party	Candidate	FPv%	Count		
Party	Candidate	FPv%	1	2	3
Fianna Fáil	Eileen Lemass	39.7	17,095	17,571	19,206
Fine Gael	Liam Skelly	39.0	16,777	17,736	21,388
Sinn Féin The Workers' Party	Tomás Mac Giolla	14.8	6,357	7,446	
Independent	John O'Halloran	1.8	785		
Labour	Brendan O'Sullivan	1.6	703		
Democratic Socialist	Michael Conaghan	1.6	667		
Independent	Matt Merrigan	0.8	334		
Independent	John Condron	0.5	233		
Independent	Séamus O'Daly	0.2	68		
Independent	Jim Tallon	0.1	42		
Electorate: 70,203 Valid: 43,061 Quota: 21,531 Turnout: 61.3%

=== February 1982 general election ===
February 1982 general election: Dublin West
Party	Candidate	FPv%	Count								
Party	Candidate	FPv%	1	2	3	4	5	6	7	8	9
Fine Gael	Jim Mitchell	19.1	8,657								
Fianna Fáil	Brian Lenihan Snr	15.4	6,972	6,996	6,996	7,000	7,006	7,066	7,216	7,610	
Fianna Fáil	Liam Lawlor	13.8	6,223	6,248	6,253	6,260	6,270	6,347	6,584	6,993	7,035
Fine Gael	Brian Fleming	12.7	5,764	6,208	6,211	6,229	6,240	6,278	7,399	8,482	
Fianna Fáil	Eileen Lemass	12.5	5,662	5,725	5,726	5,739	5,747	5,858	6,006	6,690	6,770
Fine Gael	Richard Burke	10.6	4,790	5,228	5,232	5,241	5,249	5,265	5,800	6,292	6,993
Sinn Féin The Workers' Party	Tomás Mac Giolla	7.3	3,285	3,338	3,352	3,400	3,510	3,895	4,389		
Labour	Michael Gannon	5.8	2,617	2,664	2,666	2,696	2,725	2,795			
Irish Republican Socialist	Anthony O'Hara	1.8	800	812	817	858	921				
Communist	John Montgomery	0.5	222	227	235	255					
Independent	Seán Corr	0.4	183	188	205						
Independent	Rod Eley	0.1	59	60							
Electorate: 66,701 Valid: 45,234 Quota: 7,540 Turnout: 67.8%

=== 1981 general election ===
1981 general election: Dublin West
Party	Candidate	FPv%	Count											
Party	Candidate	FPv%	1	2	3	4	5	6	7	8	9	10	11	12
Fine Gael	Jim Mitchell	20.0	9,326											
Fianna Fáil	Brian Lenihan Snr	15.3	7,169	7,204	7,205	7,209	7,214	7,230	7,256	7,330	7,882			
Fine Gael	Richard Burke	11.3	5,301	5,875	5,878	5,887	5,903	5,938	6,010	6,161	6,366	6,370	6,652	7,835
Fine Gael	Brian Fleming	10.8	5,052	5,540	5,541	5,552	5,573	5,630	5,715	5,885	6,000	6,001	6,367	7,935
Fianna Fáil	Eileen Lemass	10.6	4,953	5,038	5,040	5,041	5,048	5,061	5,116	5,279	5,959	6,003	6,866	7,434
Fianna Fáil	Liam Lawlor	7.0	3,272	3,297	3,298	3,303	3,319	3,337	3,368	3,432	4,524	4,558	4,942	5,125
Anti H-Block	Anthony O'Hara	6.5	3,034	3,087	3,100	3,155	3,171	3,183	3,253	3,840	3,893	3,896		
Fianna Fáil	Thomas Boland	5.7	2,682	2,701	2,701	2,701	2,705	2,711	2,729	2,764				
Labour	Mary Robinson	5.0	2,342	2,430	2,445	2,478	2,484	2,703	3,287	3,870	3,902	3,904	4,832	
Sinn Féin The Workers' Party	Tomás Mac Giolla	3.6	1,678	1,739	1,748	1,806	2,040	2,056	2,151					
Labour	Anne McStay	1.9	876	949	956	974	988	1,095						
Labour	Eamon Tuffy	1.0	476	489	496	499	505							
Sinn Féin The Workers' Party	Mick Finnegan	0.7	332	339	341	353								
Communist	John Montgomery	0.4	202	209	215									
Socialist Labour	Ivor Nolan	0.1	63	67										
Electorate: 66,701 Valid: 46,758 Quota: 7,794 Turnout: 70.1%

== See also ==
- Elections in the Republic of Ireland
- Politics of the Republic of Ireland
- List of Dáil by-elections
- List of political parties in the Republic of Ireland
