= Tomás Mac Giolla =

Irish politician (1924–2010)

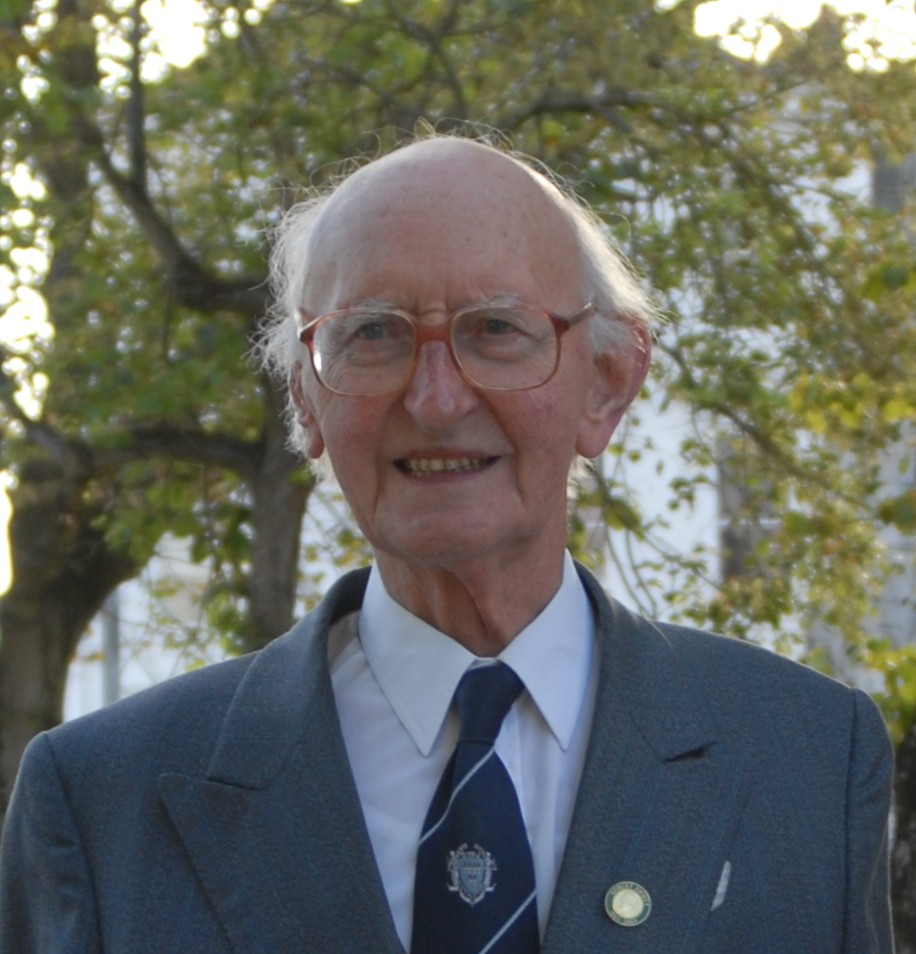
- Mac Giolla in 2008

Teachta Dála
- In office November 1982 – November 1992
- Constituency: Dublin West

Lord Mayor of Dublin
- In office 4 June 1993 – 9 June 1994
- Preceded by: Gay Mitchell
- Succeeded by: John Gormley

Leader of the Workers' Party
- In office 14 October 1962 – 11 February 1988
- Preceded by: New office
- Succeeded by: Proinsias De Rossa

President of Sinn Féin
- In office 9 March 1962 – 30 February 1970
- Preceded by: Paddy McLogan
- Succeeded by: Ruairí Ó Brádaigh

Personal details
- Born: Thomas Gill; 25 January 1924 Nenagh, County Tipperary, Ireland
- Died: 4 February 2010 (aged 86) Beaumont, Dublin, Ireland
- Party: Workers' Party
- Other political affiliations: Sinn Féin (1950–1970)
- Spouse: Máire McLaughlin (m. 1961)
- Relations: T. P. Gill (uncle)
- Education: University College Dublin

Tomás Mac Giolla (Irish pronunciation: [ˈt̪ˠʊmˠaːsˠ mˠək ˈɟɪl̪ˠə]; born Thomas Richard Gill 25 January 1924 – 4 February 2010) was an Irish Workers' Party politician who served as Lord Mayor of Dublin from 1993 to 1994, Leader of the Workers' Party from 1962 to 1988 and President of Sinn Féin from 1962 to 1970. He served as a Teachta Dála (TD) for the Dublin West constituency from 1982 to 1992.

== Early life ==
He was born Thomas Richard Gill in Nenagh, County Tipperary. His uncle T. P. Gill was a Member of Parliament (MP) and member of the Irish Parliamentary Party of Charles Stewart Parnell. Tomás's father Robert Paul Gill, an engineer and architect, also stood unsuccessfully for election on a number of occasions. His mother was Mary Hourigan from Knocknagorteeny.

Mac Giolla was educated at the local national school in Nenagh before completing his secondary education at St. Flannan's College, Ennis, County Clare. While at St. Flannan's, he changed to using the Irish language version of his name. He won a scholarship to University College Dublin where he qualified with a Bachelor of Arts degree, followed by a degree in Commerce.

A qualified Accountant, Mac Giolla was employed by the Irish Electricity Supply Board (ESB) from 1947 until he went into full-time politics in 1977.

In his early life Mac Giolla was an active republican. He joined Sinn Féin and the Irish Republican Army (IRA) around 1950. He was interned by the government of Ireland during the 1956–62 IRA border campaign. He also served a number of prison sentences in Mountjoy Prison, Dublin.

In 1961, he married May McLoughlin who was also an active member of Sinn Féin as well as of Cumann na mBan, the women's section of the IRA. She died on 24 March 2018.

== Political career ==
=== 1960s ===
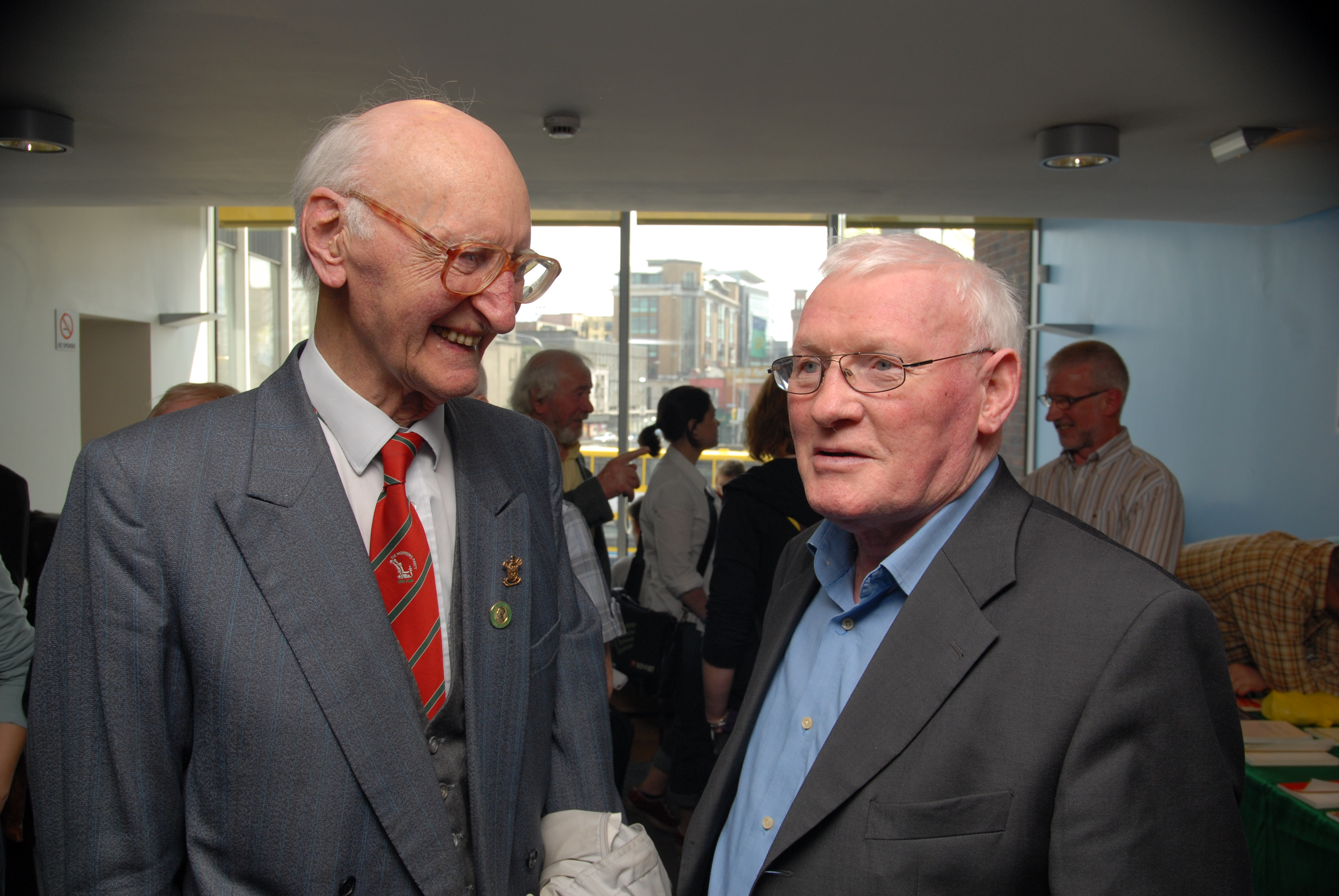
Seán Garland (right) with Tomás MacGiolla, May 2008

At the 1961 general election, Mac Giolla unsuccessfully contested the Tipperary North constituency for Sinn Féin.

In 1962, he became president of Sinn Féin, and was part of the leadership that moved the party to the left during the 1960s.

In 1970, Sinn Féin split and Mac Giolla remained leader of Official Sinn Féin, with a faction led by Ruairí Ó Brádaigh initially known as Provisional Sinn Féin. Initially, Mac Giolla's approach to his former comrades in the Provisional movement was one of conciliation, though over time, bitterness emerged. He was firm in his belief that the rise of the Provisionals was largely due to support from elements within Fianna Fáil. As violence in Northern Ireland escalated, Mac Giolla reiterated that the Official IRA (OIRA) favoured mass popular resistance, but would resort to "retaliatory" military action when deemed necessary. In contrast, he condemned the Provisionals' armed struggle, labelling it both counterproductive and sectarian. This stance sometimes led to confusion.

After the OIRA killed Unionist Northern Ireland Senator John Barnhill, Mac Giolla initially blamed British agents. However, the Officials later admitted and defended the operation as a necessary retaliation against repression. Following Bloody Sunday on 30 January 1972 the OIRA bombed the headquarters of the Parachute Regiment. This resulted in the deaths of seven people, including five female cleaners. Mac Giolla expressed shock at the attack and attributed it to an ineffective bomb maker. The question of how far the OIRA should go in using armed force was one of the issues that led to the ceasefire in May 1972, which Mac Giolla fully supported. The Officials argued that the violence was deepening sectarian divisions and preventing unity between workers. In a speech at Carrickmore, County Tyrone, in July 1972, Mac Giolla stated that "the Irish revolution … demands the support of the Protestant working class," asserting that the violence of August 1969 had been carried out not by ordinary Protestants against Catholics, but by the B Specials and some members of the Orange Order. He also claimed that the Provisional IRA's campaign was pushing Protestants towards reaction. By 1978, Mac Giolla was asserting that "the Provos are engaged in a war against the Irish people … can anyone say that the atrocities of the infamous Black and Tans were any worse?" This sharp criticism of the Provisional IRA became a defining feature of Mac Giolla's rhetoric and that of his party.

In 1969 he attended and spoke at a march in opposition to the Vietnam War in Dublin.

=== 1970s ===
In November 1973 Tomás Mac Giolla addressed the World Congress of Peace Forces in Moscow, at a time when the Officials were becoming increasingly associated with Eastern Bloc socialism. While Mac Giolla had previously criticised the Soviet system, he never fully explained when or why his stance changed. He later suggested that Cuba would be a more suitable model for Ireland than the Eastern European states. Despite his prominent role, Mac Giolla was not the primary architect of these ideological shifts within the party. His more traditional republican outlook continued to cause unease among some members. As president of Official Sinn Féin, however, Mac Giolla played a crucial role in steering the party towards electoral politics, a process that was further solidified in 1977 when the party added "The Workers' Party" to its name. His popularity among the rank and file helped ease concerns within the movement, particularly for those who viewed the name change as a further departure from its republican roots. In 1982 the party became simply the Workers' Party.

Mac Giolla was elected to Dublin City Council representing the Ballyfermot local electoral area in 1979 and at every subsequent local election until he retired from the council in 1997.

=== 1980s ===
In the November 1982 general election Mac Giolla was elected to Dáil Éireann for his party. In 1988, he stepped down as party leader and was succeeded by Proinsias De Rossa. He served as Lord Mayor of Dublin from 1993 to 1994, the first Workers' Party councillor to serve as Lord Mayor, and remained a member of Dublin Corporation until 1998.

=== 1990s to 2010 ===
While president he was regarded as a mediator between the Marxist–Leninist wing headed by Seán Garland and the social democratic wing of Proinsias De Rossa. At the 1992 special Ardfheis he voted for the motion to abandon democratic centralism and to re-constitute the party much as the Italian Communist Party became the Democratic Party of the Left. However the motion failed to reach the required two-thirds majority and after the departure of six Workers' Party TDs led by De Rossa to form the new Democratic Left party in 1992, Mac Giolla was the sole member of the Workers' Party in the Dáil. He lost his Dáil seat at the general election later that year by a margin of just 59 votes to Liam Lawlor of Fianna Fáil. In 1999, Mac Giolla wrote to the chairman of the Flood Tribunal calling for an investigation into revelations that former Dublin Assistant City and County Manager George Redmond had been the official supervisor at the election count in Dublin West and was a close associate of Liam Lawlor. In 2003, Redmond was convicted of corruption by a Dublin court but subsequently had his conviction quashed due to conflicting evidence.

In his eighties, Mac Giolla continued to be active and was a member of the group which campaigned to prevent the demolition of No. 16 Moore Street in Dublin city centre, where the surrender after the Easter Rising was completed. He also served on the Dublin '98 committee to commemorate the 200th anniversary of the 1798 Rebellion.

He died in Beaumont Hospital in Dublin on 4 February 2010 after a long illness.

== Election results ==
Elections to the Dáil
Party	Election		FPv	FPv%	Result
Sinn Féin	Tipperary North	1961	1,123	4.4	Eliminated on count 1/3
Sinn Féin	Dublin South-West	1976 by-election	1,679	6.7	Eliminated on count 4/6
Sinn Féin The Workers' Party	Dublin Ballyfermot	1977	1,385	5.4	Eliminated on count 5/8
Sinn Féin The Workers' Party	Dublin West	1981	1,678	3.6	Eliminated on count 7/12
Sinn Féin The Workers' Party	Dublin West	February 1982	3,285	7.3	Eliminated on count 7/9
Sinn Féin The Workers' Party	Dublin West	1982 by-election	6,357	14.8	Eliminated on count 2/3
Workers' Party	Dublin West	November 1982	6,844	14.7	Elected on count 5/8
Workers' Party	Dublin West	1987	6,651	12.9	Elected on count 13/17
Workers' Party	Dublin West	1989	8,218	17.1	Elected on count 1/12
Workers' Party	Dublin West	1992	2,726	7.3	Eliminated on count 14/14
Workers' Party	Dublin West	1996 by-election	2,909	10.2	Eliminated on count 9/11
Workers' Party	Dublin West	1997	1,135	2.8	Eliminated on count 2/9

== Publications ==
- The Great Irish Oil & Gas Robbery (1974). ISBN 0-8606-4006-X.

Party political offices
Preceded by Paddy McLogan	President of Sinn Féin; 1962–1970	Succeeded by Split in party Tomás Mac Giolla (Official); Ruairí Ó Brádaigh (Provisional)
Preceded by Split in party	President of the (Official) Sinn Féin/Workers' Party; 1970–1988	Succeeded by Proinsias De Rossa
Civic offices
Preceded by Gay Mitchell	Lord Mayor of Dublin; 1993–1994	Succeeded by John Gormley

Dáil	Election	Deputy (Party)	Deputy (Party)	Deputy (Party)	Deputy (Party)	Deputy (Party)
22nd	1981	Jim Mitchell (FG)	Brian Lenihan Snr (FF)	Richard Burke (FG)	Eileen Lemass (FF)	Brian Fleming (FG)
23rd	1982 (Feb)	Jim Mitchell (FG)	Brian Lenihan Snr (FF)	Richard Burke (FG)	Liam Lawlor (FF)	Brian Fleming (FG)
23rd	1982 by-election	Jim Mitchell (FG)	Brian Lenihan Snr (FF)	Liam Skelly (FG)	Liam Lawlor (FF)	Brian Fleming (FG)
24th	1982 (Nov)	Jim Mitchell (FG)	Brian Lenihan Snr (FF)	Liam Skelly (FG)	Eileen Lemass (FF)	Tomás Mac Giolla (WP)
25th	1987	Jim Mitchell (FG)	Brian Lenihan Snr (FF)	Pat O'Malley (PDs)	Liam Lawlor (FF)	Tomás Mac Giolla (WP)
26th	1989	Jim Mitchell (FG)	Brian Lenihan Snr (FF)	Austin Currie (FG)	Liam Lawlor (FF)	Tomás Mac Giolla (WP)
27th	1992	Joan Burton (Lab)	Brian Lenihan Snr (FF)	Austin Currie (FG)	Liam Lawlor (FF)	4 seats 1992–2002
27th	1996 by-election	Joan Burton (Lab)	Brian Lenihan Jnr (FF)	Austin Currie (FG)	Liam Lawlor (FF)	4 seats 1992–2002
28th	1997	Joe Higgins (SP)	Brian Lenihan Jnr (FF)	Austin Currie (FG)	Liam Lawlor (FF)	4 seats 1992–2002
29th	2002	Joe Higgins (SP)	Brian Lenihan Jnr (FF)	Joan Burton (Lab)	3 seats 2002–2011	
30th	2007	Leo Varadkar (FG)	Brian Lenihan Jnr (FF)	Joan Burton (Lab)	3 seats 2002–2011	
31st	2011	Leo Varadkar (FG)	Brian Lenihan Jnr (FF)	Joan Burton (Lab)	Joe Higgins (SP)	4 seats 2011–2024
31st	2011 by-election	Leo Varadkar (FG)	Patrick Nulty (Lab)	Joan Burton (Lab)	Joe Higgins (SP)	4 seats 2011–2024
31st	2014 by-election	Leo Varadkar (FG)	Ruth Coppinger (SP)	Joan Burton (Lab)	Joe Higgins (SP)	4 seats 2011–2024
32nd	2016	Leo Varadkar (FG)	Ruth Coppinger (AAA–PBP)	Joan Burton (Lab)	Jack Chambers (FF)	4 seats 2011–2024
33rd	2020	Leo Varadkar (FG)	Paul Donnelly (SF)	Roderic O'Gorman (GP)	Jack Chambers (FF)	4 seats 2011–2024
34th	2024	Emer Currie (FG)	Paul Donnelly (SF)	Roderic O'Gorman (GP)	Jack Chambers (FF)	Ruth Coppinger (PBP–S)
