= Emer Currie =

Irish politician (born 1979)

Emer Currie TD
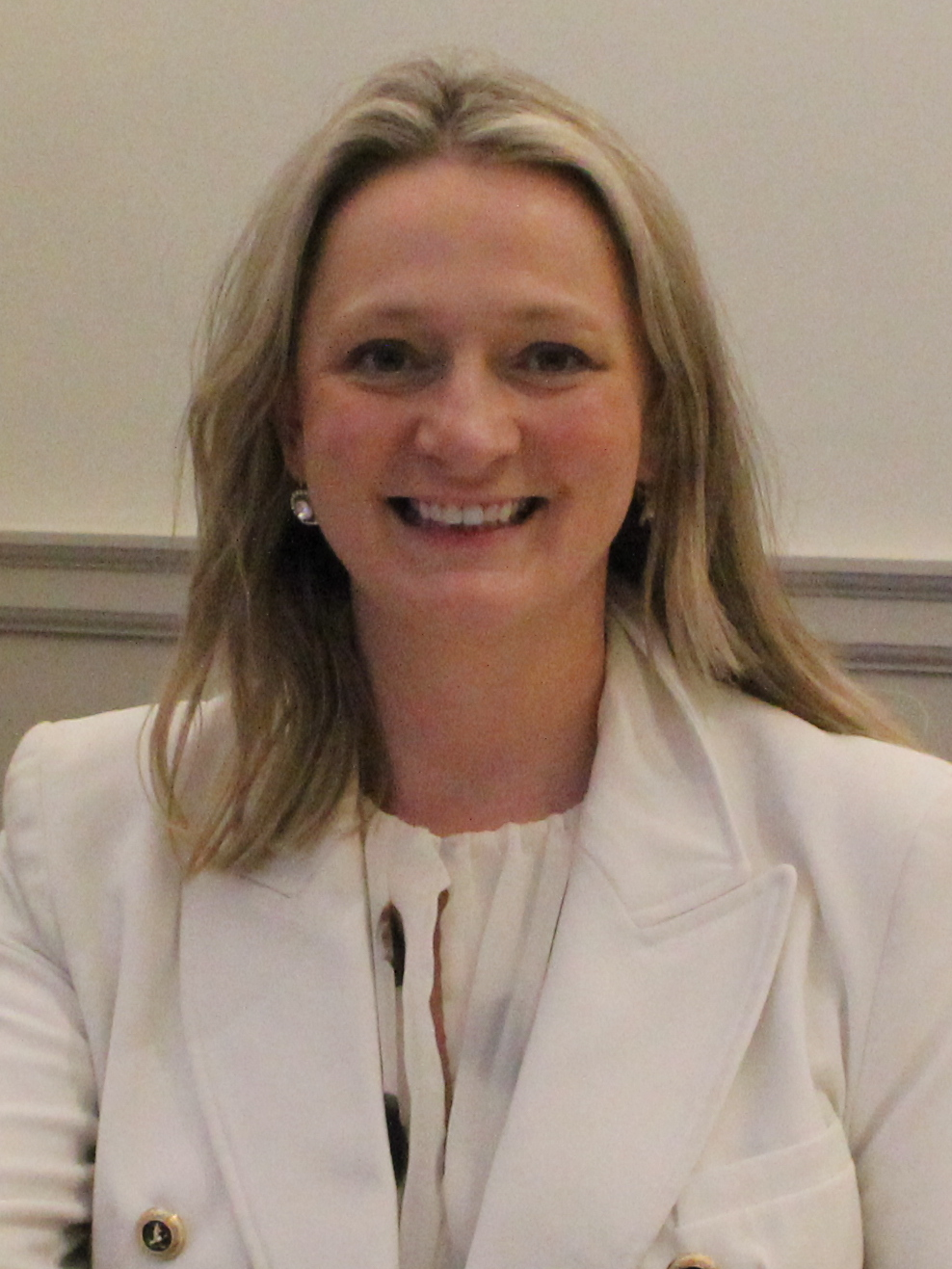
- Currie in 2024

Teachta Dála
- Incumbent
- Assumed office November 2024
- Constituency: Dublin West

Senator
- In office 29 June 2020 – 30 November 2024
- Constituency: Nominated by the Taoiseach

Personal details
- Born: 1 May 1979 (age 47) County Tyrone, Northern Ireland
- Party: Fine Gael
- Spouse: Malcolm Craig
- Children: 2
- Parent: Austin Currie (father)
- Education: Queen's University Belfast

Emer Currie (born 1 May 1979) is an Irish Fine Gael politician who has served as a Teachta Dála (TD) for the Dublin West constituency since the 2024 general election. She previously served as a Senator from 2020 to 2024, after being nominated by the Taoiseach.

She previously served as a member of Fingal County Council from 2019 to 2020.

Currie was an unsuccessful candidate at the 2020 general election as the Fine Gael running mate of outgoing Taoiseach Leo Varadkar in Dublin West. She was an unsuccessful candidate at the 2020 Seanad election but was later nominated by the Taoiseach.

Her father, Austin Currie, was a founding member of the Social Democratic and Labour Party in Northern Ireland as well as a former Minister of State and TD in the Republic of Ireland.

She was elected to the Dáil for the Dublin West constituency at the 2024 general election. On 29 January 2025 she was appointed Deputy Government Whip. Mary Butler is the Government Chief Whip.

Dáil	Election	Deputy (Party)	Deputy (Party)	Deputy (Party)	Deputy (Party)	Deputy (Party)
22nd	1981	Jim Mitchell (FG)	Brian Lenihan Snr (FF)	Richard Burke (FG)	Eileen Lemass (FF)	Brian Fleming (FG)
23rd	1982 (Feb)	Jim Mitchell (FG)	Brian Lenihan Snr (FF)	Richard Burke (FG)	Liam Lawlor (FF)	Brian Fleming (FG)
23rd	1982 by-election	Jim Mitchell (FG)	Brian Lenihan Snr (FF)	Liam Skelly (FG)	Liam Lawlor (FF)	Brian Fleming (FG)
24th	1982 (Nov)	Jim Mitchell (FG)	Brian Lenihan Snr (FF)	Liam Skelly (FG)	Eileen Lemass (FF)	Tomás Mac Giolla (WP)
25th	1987	Jim Mitchell (FG)	Brian Lenihan Snr (FF)	Pat O'Malley (PDs)	Liam Lawlor (FF)	Tomás Mac Giolla (WP)
26th	1989	Jim Mitchell (FG)	Brian Lenihan Snr (FF)	Austin Currie (FG)	Liam Lawlor (FF)	Tomás Mac Giolla (WP)
27th	1992	Joan Burton (Lab)	Brian Lenihan Snr (FF)	Austin Currie (FG)	Liam Lawlor (FF)	4 seats 1992–2002
27th	1996 by-election	Joan Burton (Lab)	Brian Lenihan Jnr (FF)	Austin Currie (FG)	Liam Lawlor (FF)	4 seats 1992–2002
28th	1997	Joe Higgins (SP)	Brian Lenihan Jnr (FF)	Austin Currie (FG)	Liam Lawlor (FF)	4 seats 1992–2002
29th	2002	Joe Higgins (SP)	Brian Lenihan Jnr (FF)	Joan Burton (Lab)	3 seats 2002–2011	
30th	2007	Leo Varadkar (FG)	Brian Lenihan Jnr (FF)	Joan Burton (Lab)	3 seats 2002–2011	
31st	2011	Leo Varadkar (FG)	Brian Lenihan Jnr (FF)	Joan Burton (Lab)	Joe Higgins (SP)	4 seats 2011–2024
31st	2011 by-election	Leo Varadkar (FG)	Patrick Nulty (Lab)	Joan Burton (Lab)	Joe Higgins (SP)	4 seats 2011–2024
31st	2014 by-election	Leo Varadkar (FG)	Ruth Coppinger (SP)	Joan Burton (Lab)	Joe Higgins (SP)	4 seats 2011–2024
32nd	2016	Leo Varadkar (FG)	Ruth Coppinger (AAA–PBP)	Joan Burton (Lab)	Jack Chambers (FF)	4 seats 2011–2024
33rd	2020	Leo Varadkar (FG)	Paul Donnelly (SF)	Roderic O'Gorman (GP)	Jack Chambers (FF)	4 seats 2011–2024
34th	2024	Emer Currie (FG)	Paul Donnelly (SF)	Roderic O'Gorman (GP)	Jack Chambers (FF)	Ruth Coppinger (PBP–S)
