= Sheila Terry (politician) =

Irish former politician (born 1950)

Senator
- In office 12 September 2002 – 13 September 2007
- Constituency: Industrial and Commercial Panel

Personal details
- Born: 7 June 1950 (age 75) Dublin, Ireland
- Party: Progressive Democrats; Independent; Fine Gael

Sheila Terry (born 7 June 1950) is an Irish former Fine Gael politician who served as a member of the 22nd Seanad.

As a member of the Progressive Democrats (PDs), Terry was elected at the 1991 local elections as a PD member of Fingal County Council for the Castleknock electoral area. She stood as a PD candidate in the Dublin West constituency at the 1992 general election and at the by-election in 1996.

She left the Progressive Democrats before the 1999 local elections, when she was re-elected to the council as an independent, and joined Fine Gael in about 2000. She then stood as a Fine Gael for Dáil Éireann in the Dublin West constituency at the 2002 general election, but did not win a seat. However, in the subsequent Seanad elections she was elected by the Industrial and Commercial Panel.

She gave up her council seat when the dual mandate was abolished in 2003 (future Taoiseach Leo Varadkar was co-opted to replace her on the council), and did not contest the 2007 general election. She stood again in the 2007 Seanad election, but lost her seat.
