= Joe Higgins (politician) =

Irish former politician (born 1949)

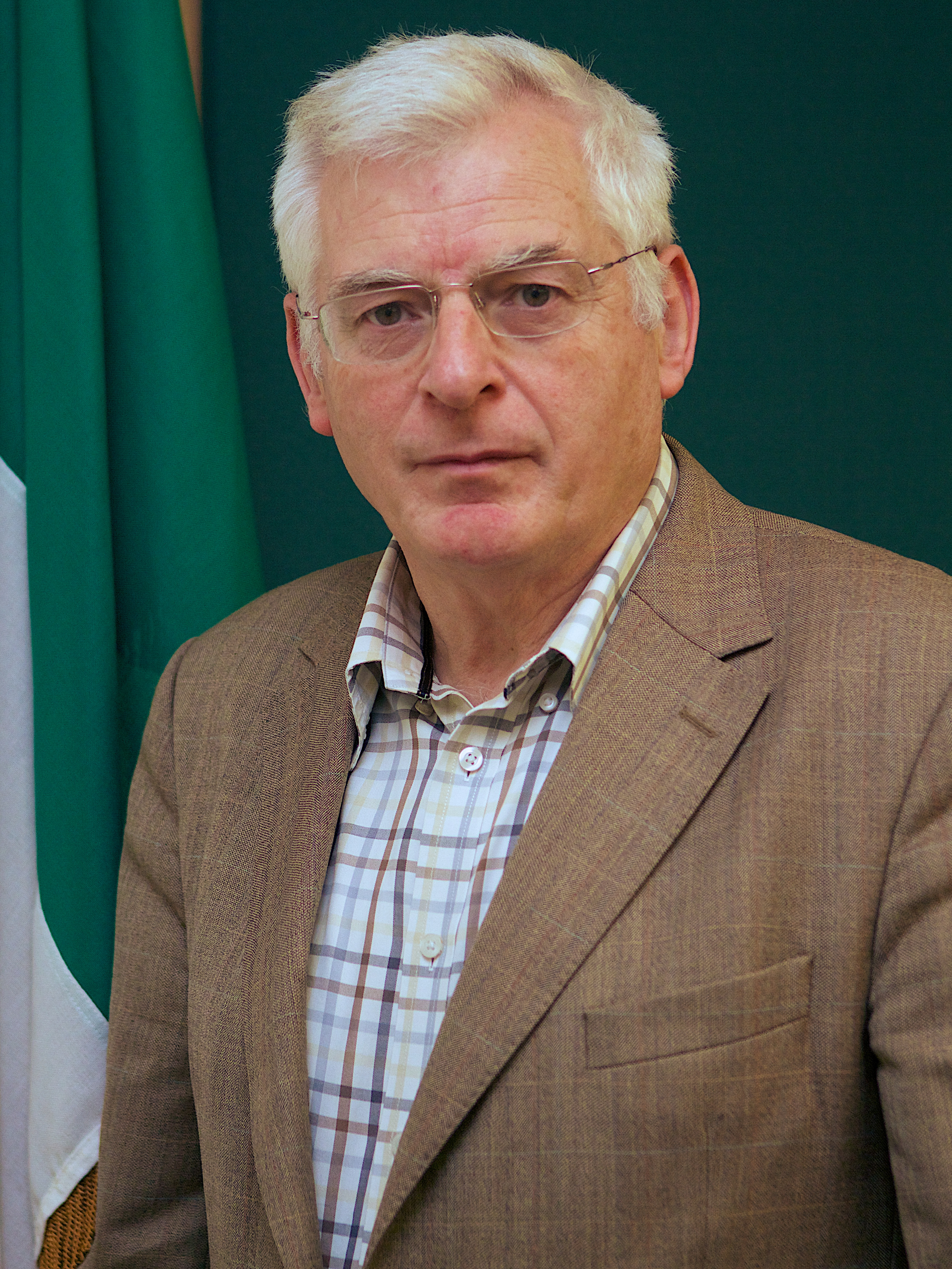
- Higgins in 2014

Teachta Dála
- In office February 2011 – February 2016
- In office June 1997 – May 2007
- Constituency: Dublin West

Member of the European Parliament
- In office 7 June 2009 – 9 March 2011
- Constituency: Dublin

Personal details
- Born: 20 May 1949 (age 77) Lispole, County Kerry, Ireland
- Party: Socialist Party (since 1998)
- Other political affiliations: Labour Party (until 1989); United Left Alliance (2010–2013)
- Relatives: Liam Higgins (brother)
- Education: University College Dublin

Joe Higgins (born 20 May 1949) is an Irish former Socialist Party politician who served as a Teachta Dála (TD) for the Dublin West constituency from 1997 to 2007 and from 2011 to 2016. He served as a Member of the European Parliament (MEP) for the Dublin constituency from 2009 to 2011.

== Early life ==
One of nine children of a small farming family, Higgins was born in 1949 in Lispole, into a small farming family and part of the Dingle Gaeltacht in County Kerry. He attended the Dingle Christian Brothers School and, after finishing, entered the priesthood. As part of his training, he spent time in the United States in the late 1960s and early 1970s.

Higgins became politicised at the time of anti-Vietnam War protests and the civil rights movement. He is a brother of Liam Higgins, who played football with the Kerry GAA senior team in the 1960s and 1970s.

Higgins is bilingual in English and Irish.

== Political career ==
=== Early activism ===
Higgins returned to Ireland and attended University College Dublin, studying English and French. For several years he was a teacher in several Dublin inner city schools. While at university he joined the Labour Party and became active in the Militant Tendency, an entryist Trotskyist group that operated within the Labour Party. Throughout his time in the Labour Party he was a strong opponent of coalition politics, along with TDs Emmet Stagg and Michael D. Higgins. He was elected to the Administrative Council of the Labour Party by the membership in the 1980s. In 1989, Higgins was expelled alongside 13 other members of Militant Tendency by party leader Dick Spring. The group eventually left the party and formed Militant Labour, which became the Socialist Party in 1996.

Higgins spent over half his salary on the Socialist Party and causes he supported. He was elected to Dublin County Council in 1991 for the Mulhuddart electoral area, and was until 2003 a member of Fingal County Council. In 1996, he campaigned against local authority water and refuse charges and contested the Dublin West by-election, losing narrowly to Brian Lenihan Jnr.

=== Dáil Éireann: 1997–2007 ===
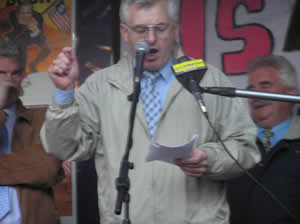
Joe Higgins speaking in Dublin 25 June 2004

Higgins was first elected to Dáil Éireann at the 1997 general election, and re-elected at the 2002 general election. He lost his seat at the 2007 general election, but regained it at the 2011 general election. From 2002 to 2007, he was a member of the Technical Group in the Dáil which consisted of various Independent TDs, Sinn Féin and the Green Party grouped together for better speaking time.

In 2003, Higgins accused Taoiseach Bertie Ahern of having "blood on his hands" in relation to the use of Shannon Airport by American troops. He spoke out against the Iraq War while a TD, and addressed the Dublin leg of the 20 March 2003 International Day of Action.

In April 2003, Minister for Justice, Equality and Law Reform Michael McDowell addressed Higgins during a Dáil debate, saying "I do not take lectures on democracy from a Trotskyite communist like Deputy Joe Higgins."

On 19 September 2003, Higgins was sentenced to one month in Mountjoy Prison as a result of his protest against the non-collection of refuse in his constituency during the Anti-Bin Tax Campaign. He was also prominent in the successful 2005 campaign to bring Nigerian school student Olukunle Eluhanla back to Ireland after he had been deported. Higgins remains an opponent of the deportation policy.

When President Mary McAleese telephoned Higgins in 2004 to inform him of her decision to seek re-election, he told her that her office was "superfluous and should be abolished". McAleese was reported to have been left speechless.

At the 2004 European Parliament election, Higgins received 23,200 (5.5%) votes in the Dublin constituency, double his 1999 result, but did not win a seat.

Higgins used his platform in the Dáil to raise the issue of exploitation of migrant and guest workers in Ireland. He and others claimed that many companies were paying migrants below the minimum wage and, in some cases, not paying overtime rates. In March 2005, Higgins and a delegation of Turkish ex-employees of GAMA Endustri, a Turkish construction firm working in Ireland, travelled to Amsterdam, Netherlands, where they discovered that GAMA had been secreting up to €30 million in workers' wages without their knowledge. He expressed opposition in the Dáil to the jailing of the Rossport Five in July 2005. He raised the outsourcing of jobs by Irish Ferries in the Dáil in November 2005, requesting new legislation to regulate what he described as "these modern slavers".

In May 2006, Higgins boycotted an address to the Dáil by Australian Prime Minister John Howard owing to Australia's role in the Iraq War, the country's "criminal" legislation on worker's rights, and its theft of oil and gas from the poor people of East Timor, describing it as "reminiscent of Margaret Thatcher".

In October 2006, Higgins requested the suspension of normal business in the Dáil after it emerged that Ryanair had upped its share in Aer Lingus overnight, amid concerns for workers' rights and passenger welfare.

In 2008, Higgins was a political opponent of the Irish government's first Treaty of Lisbon referendum. He described the success of the "No" campaign as "a huge rebuff to the Irish political establishment".

=== European Parliament: 2009–2011 ===
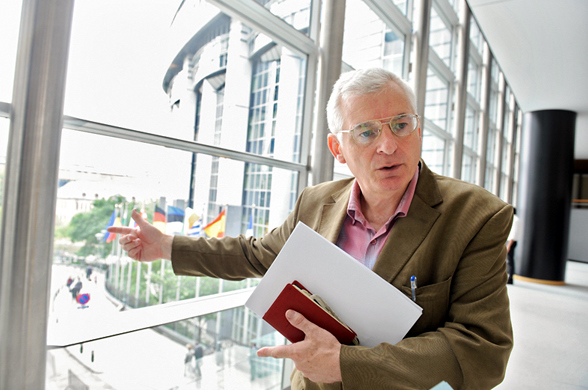
Higgins at the European Parliament, Brussels in 2009

Higgins successfully contested the 2009 European Parliament election for the Dublin constituency, beating two incumbents, Mary Lou McDonald of Sinn Féin and Eoin Ryan of Fianna Fáil, for the third and final seat. He was elected on the same day to Fingal County Council for the Castleknock electoral area, topping the poll. As Irish law prohibits politicians having a dual mandate, Higgins vacated this council seat in July 2009 and was replaced by Matt Waine. He was a member of the European United Left–Nordic Green Left (EUL–NGL) group in the European Parliament, the European Parliament's Committee on International Trade, and the delegation for relations with the countries of South Asia. He was also a substitute member of the Committee on Employment and Social Affairs, the Committee on Petitions and the delegation for relations with the Mercosur countries.

In 2009, Higgins was a political opponent of the Irish government's re-run of the Treaty of Lisbon referendum. He said the guarantees did not change the Treaty. Higgins said, "The overall agenda here is quite simply the ruling classes, or the classes of Europe intend to stride on to the world stage as a powerful economic entity. And they want to be as powerful as the US, meaning they want a stronger foreign policy and a military wing to back them up." He also spoke out against Ireland's Catholic bishops, who claimed neither a "Yes" nor a "No" vote would threaten the unborn, saying that EU spending on arms ought to be enough for the bishops to join the "No" campaign.

On 23 November 2010, Higgins walked out of a meeting of Irish MEPs with EU Economic and Monetary Affairs Commissioner Olli Rehn, after two minutes in Strasbourg, prompting criticism from Fine Gael MEP Gay Mitchell. Higgins said he walked out as information Rehn was giving was to be confidential and that he felt it would have been a betrayal to stay, calling it "unacceptable".

During a debate at the European Parliament in Strasbourg, Higgins described the European Financial Stability Facility (EFSF) as "nothing more than another tool to cushion major European banks from the consequences of their reckless speculation on the financial markets". He claimed the EFSF was a "mechanism to make working class people throughout Europe pay for the crisis of a broken financial system and a crisis-ridden European capitalism". He accused President of the European Commission José Manuel Barroso and President of the European Council Herman Van Rompuy of effectively transferring tens of billions of euros of private bad debts "on to the shoulders of the Irish people". Barroso rejected the claims, instead blaming Irish banks and lax regulation for Ireland's problems, saying: "To the distinguished member of this Parliament who comes from Ireland, who asked a question suggesting that the problems of Ireland were created by Europe, let me tell you: the problems of Ireland were created by the irresponsible financial behaviour of some Irish institutions, and by the lack of supervision in the Irish market".

Paul Murphy replaced Higgins as an MEP when Higgins was re-elected to the Dáil.

=== Dáil Éireann: 2011–2016 ===
Higgins was elected again as TD for Dublin West at the 2011 general election. He won the third seat (of four) with 8,084 first preference votes. In his first speech in the 31st Dáil, he opposed the nomination of Fine Gael's Enda Kenny as Taoiseach. Higgins announced that he would "put up a principled opposition to the Fine Gael-Labour coalition which is most likely", since they are "going to carry on with the same policies as Fianna Fáil, making working-class people pay for the bankers' bad gambling debts". He promised to work with the other United Left Alliance TDs "as a coherent, principled opposition". He suggested the creation of a national exploration company which would allow the state to retain any profits obtained from natural resources.

Ahead of the occasion of Queen Elizabeth II's visit to the Republic of Ireland in May 2011, Higgins asked Enda Kenny in the Dáil if "the Queen of England might be politely asked to contribute to the cost of her bed & breakfast during her visit to Ireland", observing that "the Irish people needed the financial help since they could soon be sleeping rough, as the country faced bankruptcy to pay off the debts of German and French banks, which had recklessly gambled and lost in the Irish property bubble". On 4 May 2011, Enda Kenny was forced to apologise to Higgins in the Dáil after falsely accusing him of being a supporter of Osama bin Laden after Higgins offered criticism of his assassination by the CIA. Higgins had asked the Taoiseach: "Is assassination only justified if the target is a reactionary, anti-democratic, anti-human rights obscurantist like bin Laden?".

He vowed there would be a nationwide campaign of "people power" against any household and water charges. In September 2011, Higgins committed to facilitating the nomination of Senator David Norris for a place on the ballot paper ahead of the 2011 Irish presidential election, despite multiple controversies enveloping the candidate. On the occasion of the publication of the Keane report on mortgage arrears in October 2011, Higgins criticised Enda Kenny's government and said the report was "a banker's charter written by bankers". His description of allowing the banks to solve their own problems as being "like sending a bunch of marauding foxes that had raided a henhouse back to give mouth-to-mouth resuscitation to their victims" was quoted several times by other commentators in the media. Higgins addressed "The EU in Crisis" public debate, held at the Ireland Institute in Dublin in October 2011. He served as Ruth Coppinger's election agent in the 2011 Dublin West by-election, held alongside the presidential election. At her campaign launch Higgins said Taoiseach Enda Kenny was engaging in a "cynical manipulation of the political agenda" by delaying the publication of his government's comprehensive spending review until after the elections.

In the Dáil, Higgins accused Tánaiste Eamon Gilmore of doing nothing for the 14 Irish citizens being held "incommunicado" by Israel in November 2011. In December 2011, Higgins described as a disgraceful campaign of intimidation the fines imposed by the government on people who were unable to pay a new household charge brought in as part of the latest austerity budget and said to Enda Kenny that he would be "the new Captain Boycott of austerity in this country". He asked that Minister for Finance Michael Noonan provide EBS staff with the 13th month end-of-year payment they were being denied.

In September 2012, he publicly disagreed with former Socialist Party colleague Clare Daly, saying it was "unfortunate" that she had resigned from the party, but that it was impossible for Daly under the banner of the Socialist Party to continue to offer political support to Mick Wallace, who was at that time embroiled in scandal.

He announced in April 2014 that he would not contest the next Dáil election. At the time he stated his belief that the "baton of elected representation" should be carried by another generation of Socialist Party politicians — like Ruth Coppinger and Paul Murphy.

== See also ==
- List of members of the Oireachtas imprisoned since 1923

Dáil	Election	Deputy (Party)	Deputy (Party)	Deputy (Party)	Deputy (Party)	Deputy (Party)
22nd	1981	Jim Mitchell (FG)	Brian Lenihan Snr (FF)	Richard Burke (FG)	Eileen Lemass (FF)	Brian Fleming (FG)
23rd	1982 (Feb)	Jim Mitchell (FG)	Brian Lenihan Snr (FF)	Richard Burke (FG)	Liam Lawlor (FF)	Brian Fleming (FG)
23rd	1982 by-election	Jim Mitchell (FG)	Brian Lenihan Snr (FF)	Liam Skelly (FG)	Liam Lawlor (FF)	Brian Fleming (FG)
24th	1982 (Nov)	Jim Mitchell (FG)	Brian Lenihan Snr (FF)	Liam Skelly (FG)	Eileen Lemass (FF)	Tomás Mac Giolla (WP)
25th	1987	Jim Mitchell (FG)	Brian Lenihan Snr (FF)	Pat O'Malley (PDs)	Liam Lawlor (FF)	Tomás Mac Giolla (WP)
26th	1989	Jim Mitchell (FG)	Brian Lenihan Snr (FF)	Austin Currie (FG)	Liam Lawlor (FF)	Tomás Mac Giolla (WP)
27th	1992	Joan Burton (Lab)	Brian Lenihan Snr (FF)	Austin Currie (FG)	Liam Lawlor (FF)	4 seats 1992–2002
27th	1996 by-election	Joan Burton (Lab)	Brian Lenihan Jnr (FF)	Austin Currie (FG)	Liam Lawlor (FF)	4 seats 1992–2002
28th	1997	Joe Higgins (SP)	Brian Lenihan Jnr (FF)	Austin Currie (FG)	Liam Lawlor (FF)	4 seats 1992–2002
29th	2002	Joe Higgins (SP)	Brian Lenihan Jnr (FF)	Joan Burton (Lab)	3 seats 2002–2011	
30th	2007	Leo Varadkar (FG)	Brian Lenihan Jnr (FF)	Joan Burton (Lab)	3 seats 2002–2011	
31st	2011	Leo Varadkar (FG)	Brian Lenihan Jnr (FF)	Joan Burton (Lab)	Joe Higgins (SP)	4 seats 2011–2024
31st	2011 by-election	Leo Varadkar (FG)	Patrick Nulty (Lab)	Joan Burton (Lab)	Joe Higgins (SP)	4 seats 2011–2024
31st	2014 by-election	Leo Varadkar (FG)	Ruth Coppinger (SP)	Joan Burton (Lab)	Joe Higgins (SP)	4 seats 2011–2024
32nd	2016	Leo Varadkar (FG)	Ruth Coppinger (AAA–PBP)	Joan Burton (Lab)	Jack Chambers (FF)	4 seats 2011–2024
33rd	2020	Leo Varadkar (FG)	Paul Donnelly (SF)	Roderic O'Gorman (GP)	Jack Chambers (FF)	4 seats 2011–2024
34th	2024	Emer Currie (FG)	Paul Donnelly (SF)	Roderic O'Gorman (GP)	Jack Chambers (FF)	Ruth Coppinger (PBP–S)
