= 1981 Irish general election =

Election to the 22nd Dáil

- 11 June 1981

166 seats in Dáil Éireann (Note: Including Pádraig Faulkner (FF), returned automatically for Louth as outgoing Ceann Comhairle, under Art. 16.6 of the Constitution and the Electoral Act 1963, as amended.) 84 seats needed for a majority
- Turnout: 76.2% ▼0.1 pp
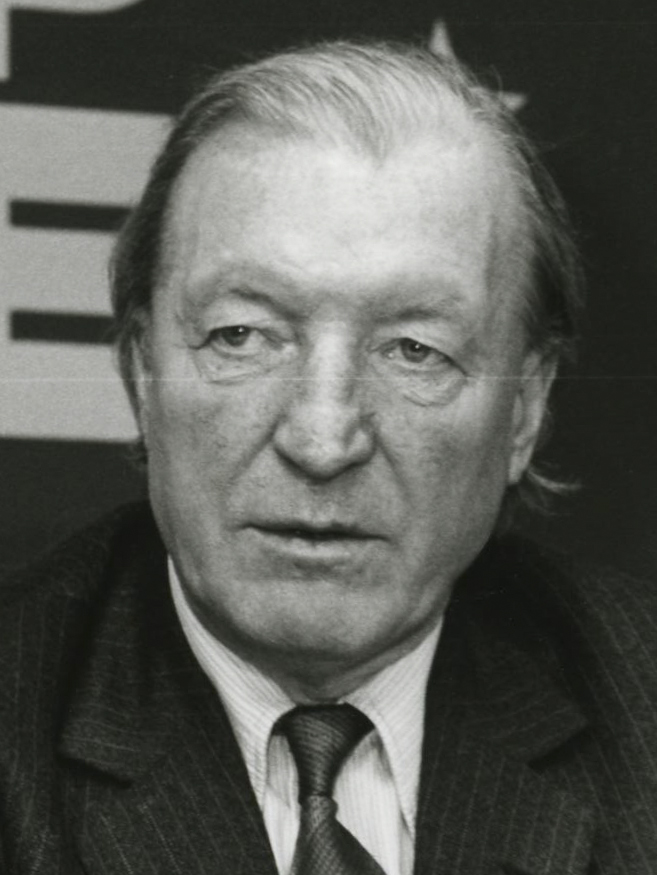

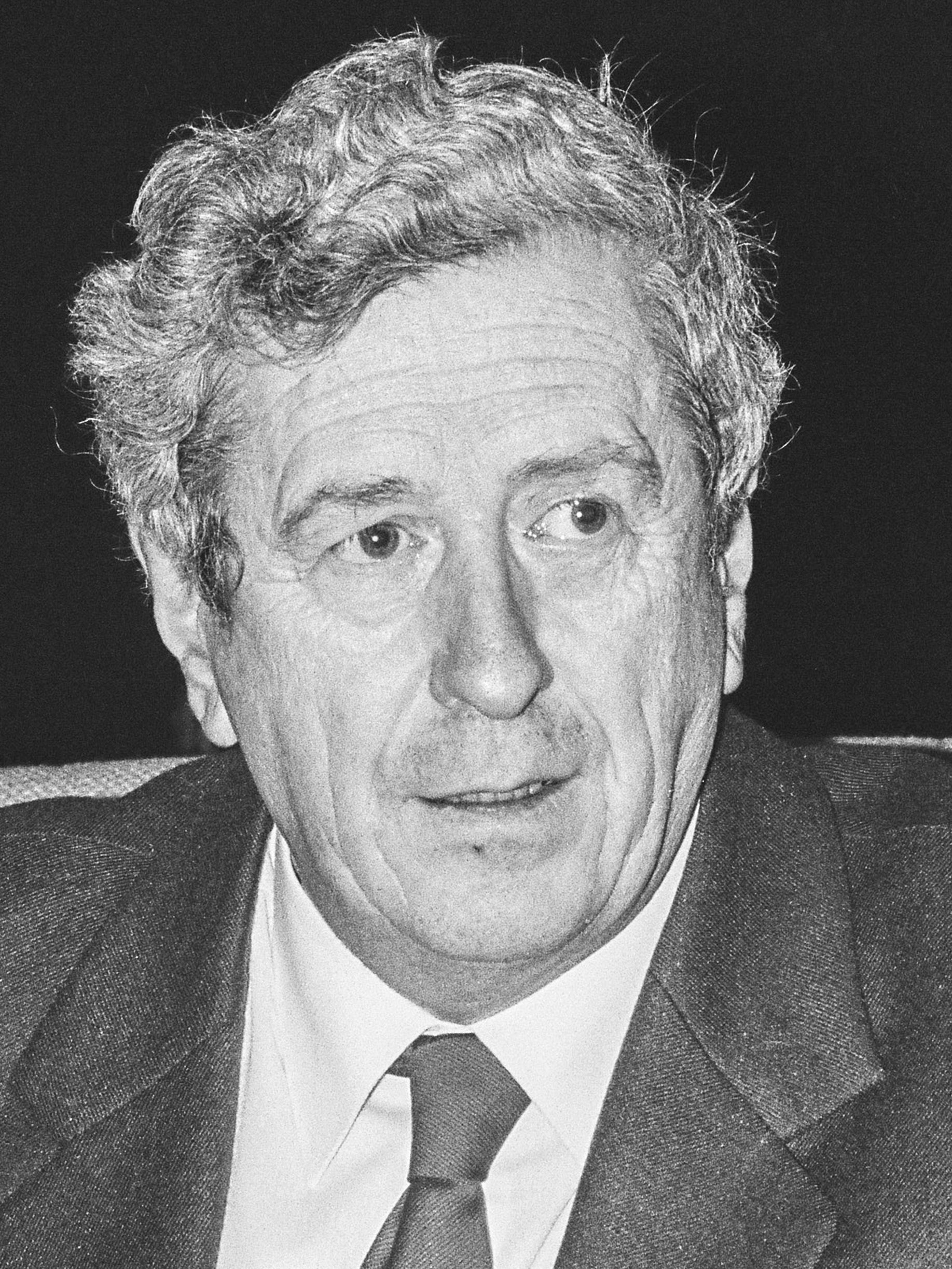

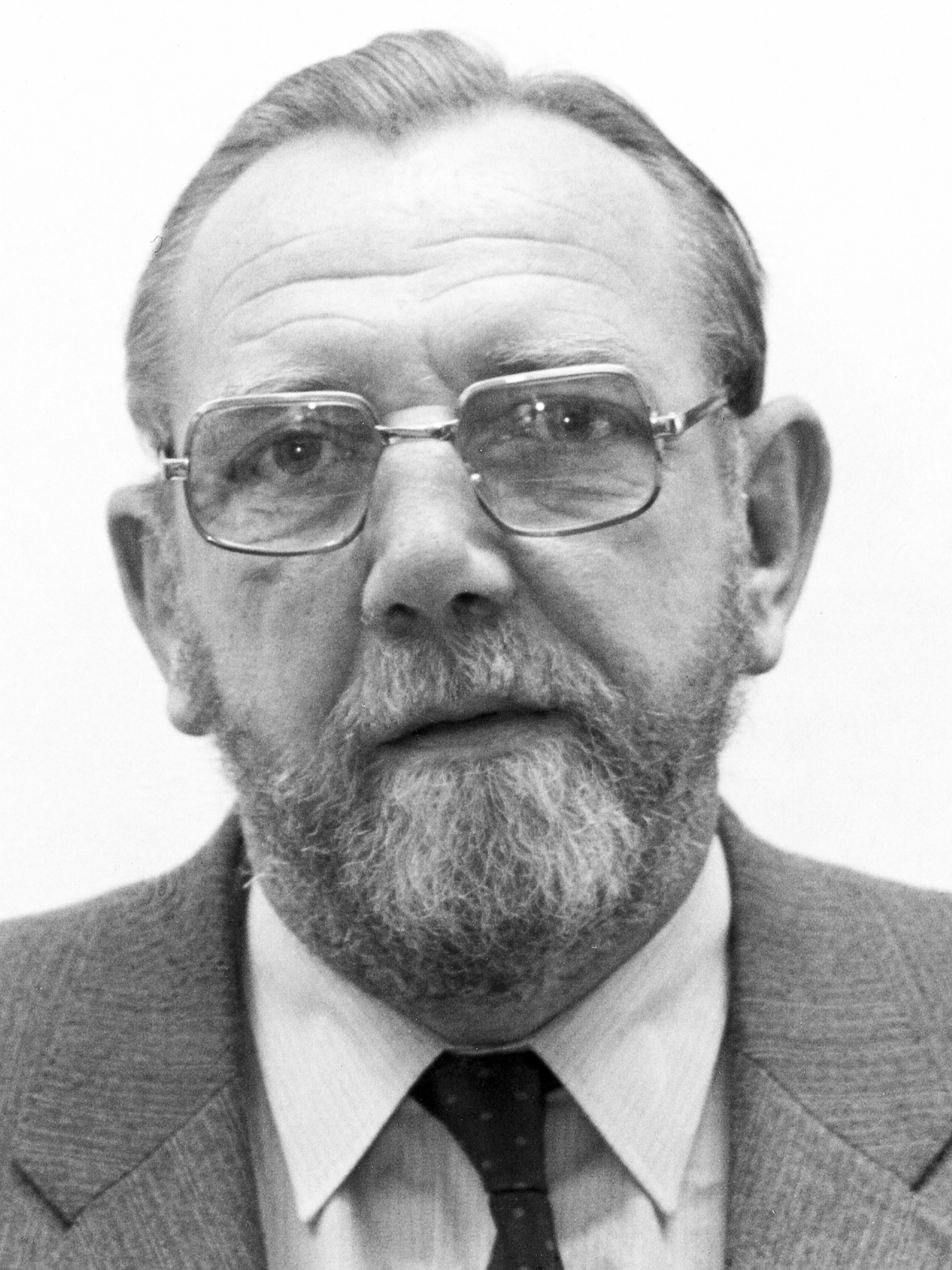

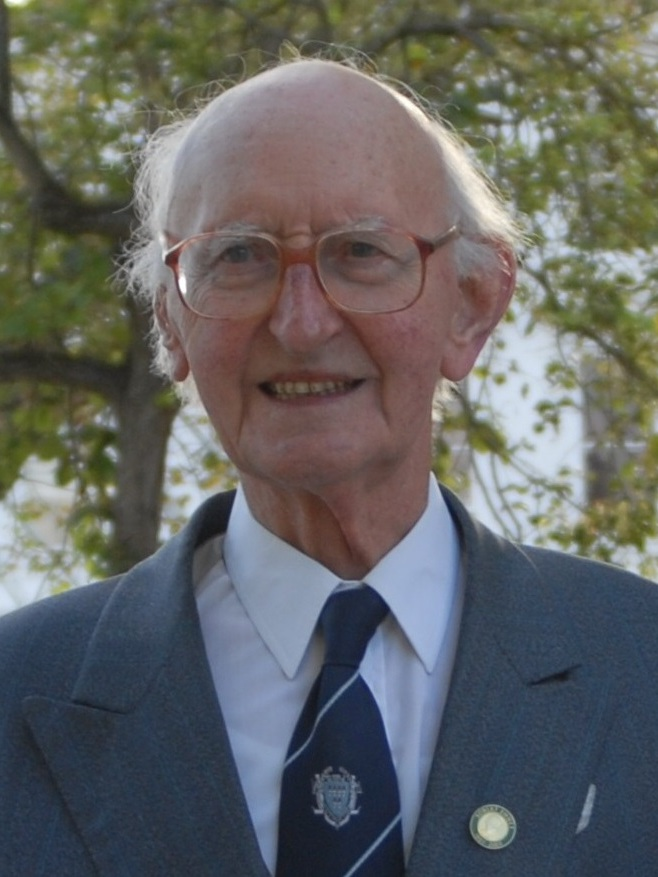

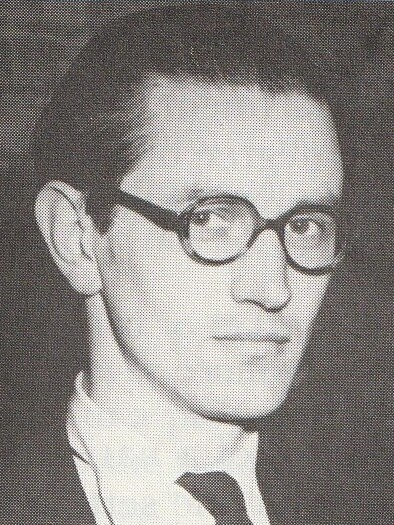
| | First party | Second party | Third party |
|---|---|---|---|
| Leader | Charles Haughey | Garret FitzGerald | Frank Cluskey |
| Party | Fianna Fáil | Fine Gael | Labour |
| Leader since | 7 December 1979 | 1977 | 1977 |
| Leader's seat | Dublin North-Central | Dublin South-East | Dublin South-Central (defeated) |
| Last election | 84 seats, 50.6% | 43 seats, 30.5% | 17 seats, 11.6% |
| Seats won | 78 | 65 | 15 |
| Seat change | ▼6 | ▲22 | ▼2 |
| Popular vote | 777,616 | 626,376 | 169,990 |
| Percentage | 45.3% | 36.5% | 9.9% |
| Swing | ▼5.3 pp | ▲6.0 pp | ▼1.7 pp |
| | Fourth party | Fifth party |
| Leader | Tomás Mac Giolla | Noël Browne |
| Party | Sinn Féin The Workers' Party | Socialist Labour |
| Leader since | 1977 | 1981 |
| Leader's seat | N/A | Dublin North-Central |
| Last election | 0 seats, 1.7% | New |
| Seats won | 1 | 1 |
| Seat change | ▲1 | New |
| Popular vote | 29,561 | 7,107 |
| Percentage | 1.7% | 0.4% |
| Swing | 0.0 pp | New |
Taoiseach before election
Charles Haughey
Fianna Fáil
Taoiseach after election
Garret FitzGerald
Fine Gael

The 1981 Irish general election to the 22nd Dáil was held on Thursday, 11 June, following the dissolution of the 21st Dáil on 21 May by President Patrick Hillery on the request of Taoiseach Charles Haughey. The general election took place in 41 Dáil constituencies throughout Ireland for 166 seats in Dáil Éireann, the house of representatives of the Oireachtas. The number of seats in the Dáil was increased by 18 from 148 under the Electoral (Amendment) Act 1980.

The 22nd Dáil met at Leinster House on 30 June to nominate the Taoiseach for appointment by the president and to approve the appointment of a new government of Ireland. Garret FitzGerald was appointed Taoiseach, forming the 17th government of Ireland, a minority coalition government of Fine Gael and the Labour Party.

== Campaign ==
The general election of 1981 was the first one of five during the 1980s. The election also saw three new leaders of the three main parties fight their first general election. Charles Haughey had become Taoiseach and leader of Fianna Fáil at the end of 1979, Garret FitzGerald was the new leader of Fine Gael and Frank Cluskey was leading the Labour Party.

Haughey and Fianna Fáil seemed extremely popular with the electorate in early 1981. He was expected to call the election at the time of the Fianna Fáil ardfheis on 14 February, but the Stardust fire caused the ardfheis to be postponed, and the Republican hunger strike in the Maze Prison began in March. By the dissolution in May, much of the earlier optimism in the party had filtered out. The Anti H-Block movement fielded abstentionist candidates in solidarity with the hunger strikers, undermining the Republican credentials of Fianna Fáil.

Fianna Fáil's manifesto promised more spending programmes and Fine Gael put forward a series of tax-cutting plans.

== Result ==
Election to the 22nd Dáil – 11 June 1981
| Party | Leader | Seats | ± | % of seats | First pref. votes | % FPv | ±% |
|---|---|---|---|---|---|---|---|
| Fianna Fáil | Charles Haughey | 78 | –6 | 47.0 | 777,616 | 45.3 | –5.3 |
| Fine Gael | Garret FitzGerald | 65 | +22 | 39.2 | 626,376 | 36.5 | +6.0 |
| Labour | Frank Cluskey | 15 | –2 | 9.0 | 169,990 | 9.9 | –1.7 |
| Sinn Féin The Workers' Party | Tomás Mac Giolla | 1 | +1 | 0.6 | 29,561 | 1.7 | 0 |
| Socialist Labour | Noël Browne | 1 | New | 0.6 | 7,107 | 0.4 | – |
| Socialist Party | Eamonn O'Brien | 0 | New | 0 | 571 | 0.0 | – |
| Communist | Eugene McCartan | 0 | 0 | 0.0 | 358 | 0.0 | – |
| Independent | N/A | 6 | +2 | 3.6 | 106,632 | 6.2 | +0.7 |
| Spoilt votes | | | | | 16,168 | —N/a | —N/a |
| Total | | 166 | +18 | 100 | 1,734,379 | 100 | —N/a |
| Electorate/Turnout | | | | | 2,275,450 | 76.2% | —N/a |

Independents include Anti H-Block (42,803 votes, 2 seats) and Independent Fianna Fáil (13,546 votes, 1 seat).

=== Voting summary ===
First preference vote
| Fianna Fáil | 45.26% |
| Fine Gael | 36.36% |
| Labour | 9.89% |
| Sinn Féin (Workers' Party) | 1.72% |
| Others | 0.46% |
| Independent | 6.2% |

=== Seats summary ===
Dáil seats
| Fianna Fáil | 46.99% |
| Fine Gael | 39.16% |
| Labour | 9.04% |
| Sinn Féin (Workers' Party) | 0.60% |
| Socialist Labour Party | 0.60% |
| Independent | 3.61% |

== Government formation ==
Fianna Fáil lost seats as a result of sympathy to the Anti H-Block candidates and the attractive tax proposals of Fine Gael. It was the worst performance for Fianna Fáil in twenty years. Meanwhile, Labour Party leader Frank Cluskey lost his seat, necessitating a leadership change with Michael O'Leary succeeding Cluskey. A Fine Gael–Labour Party coalition government came to power. Fine Gael and the Labour Party formed the 17th Government of Ireland, a minority coalition government, with Garret FitzGerald becoming Taoiseach.

== Dáil membership changes ==
The following changes took place at this election:

- 20 outgoing TDs retired
- 18 additional seats added to the Dáil
- 127 outgoing TDs stood for re-election (also Pádraig Faulkner, the outgoing Ceann Comhairle who was automatically returned)
  - 109 of those were re-elected
  - 18 failed to be re-elected
- 56 successor TDs were elected
  - 50 were elected for the first time
  - 6 had previously been TDs
- There were 7 successor female TDs, replacing 3 outgoing, increasing the total by 4 to 11.

Where more than one change took place in a constituency the concept of successor is an approximation for presentation only. Where a number of related constituency changes took place in an area, such as Cork, the outgoing constituency for retiring TDs and the allocation of new seats are approximations for presentation only. Outgoing TDs re-elected in a new constituency, with no related changes, are not recorded as a change

| Constituency | Departing TD | Party | Change | Comment | Successor TD | Party |
|---|---|---|---|---|---|---|
| Carlow–Kilkenny | Jim Gibbons | Fianna Fáil | Lost seat | Governey: Former TD | Desmond Governey | Fine Gael |
| Cavan–Monaghan | Jimmy Leonard | Fianna Fáil | Lost seat | Doherty: Anti H-Block. Was on hunger strike at the time of his election | Kieran Doherty | Independent |
| Clare | Frank Taylor | Fine Gael | Retired | | Madeleine Taylor | Fine Gael |
| Clare | Seat added | | | Loughnane: moved from Galway West | Bill Loughnane | Fianna Fáil |
| Cork East | Jerry Cronin | Fianna Fáil | Retired (from Cork North-East) | | Carey Joyce | Fianna Fáil |
| Cork East | Richard Barry | Fine Gael | Retired (from Cork North-East) | First TD to be elected for Official Sinn Féin/The Workers' Party. | Joe Sherlock | Sinn Féin The Workers' Party |
| Cork North-Central | Jack Lynch | Fianna Fáil | Retired (from Cork City) | | Denis Lyons | Fianna Fáil |
| Cork North-Central | Seat added | | | | Bernard Allen | Fine Gael |
| Cork North-Central | Seat added | | | | Toddy O'Sullivan | Labour |
| Cork North-West | | | | | Frank Crowley | Fine Gael |
| Cork South-Central | Barry Cogan | Fianna Fáil | Lost seat (moved from Cork Mid) | | Hugh Coveney | Fine Gael |
| Cork South-West | Michael Pat Murphy | Labour | Retired | | P. J. Sheehan | Fine Gael |
| Cork South-West | Joe Walsh | Fianna Fáil | Lost seat | Crowley: Former TD | Flor Crowley | Fianna Fáil |
| Donegal North-East | No membership changes | | | | | |
| Donegal South-West | Seat added | | | | Pat "the Cope" Gallagher | Fianna Fáil |
| Dublin North | Joe Fox | Fianna Fáil | Lost seat (moved from Dublin County North) | | Nora Owen | Fine Gael |
| Dublin North-Central | Seat added | | | | George Birmingham | Fine Gael |
| Dublin Central | Vivion de Valera | Fianna Fáil | Retired (from Dublin Cabra) | (Ahern: moved from Dublin Finglas) | Bertie Ahern | Fianna Fáil |
| Dublin Central | Tom Leonard | Fianna Fáil | Lost seat (moved from Dublin Cabra) | (Colley: from Dublin Clontarf) | George Colley | Fianna Fáil |
| Dublin Central | Luke Belton | Fine Gael | Lost seat (moved from Dublin Finglas) | | Alice Glenn | Fine Gael |
| Dublin North-East | | | | | Liam Fitzgerald | Fianna Fáil |
| Dublin North-East | | | | | Seán Loftus | Independent |
| Dublin North-West | | | | | Mary Flaherty | Fine Gael |
| Dublin North-West | Timothy Killeen | Fianna Fáil | Lost seat (moved from Dublin Artane) | | Michael Barrett | Fianna Fáil |
| Dublin South | | | | | Nuala Fennell | Fine Gael |
| Dublin South | Síle de Valera | Fianna Fáil | Lost seat (moved from Dublin County Mid) | | Séamus Brennan | Fianna Fáil |
| Dublin South | John Horgan | Labour | Lost seat(moved from Dublin County South) | | Alan Shatter | Fine Gael |
| Dublin South-West | | | | | Mary Harney | Fianna Fáil |
| Dublin South-West | | | | | Mervyn Taylor | Labour |
| Dublin West | | | | Burke: Former TD | Richard Burke | Fine Gael |
| Dublin West | Mark Clinton | Fine Gael | Retired (from Dublin County West) | | Brian Fleming | Fine Gael |
| Dublin West | Liam Lawlor | Fianna Fáil | Lost seat (moved from Dublin County West) | (Lemass: from Dublin Ballyfermot) | Eileen Lemass | Fianna Fáil |
| Dublin South-Central | Seat added | | | (Briscoe: from Dublin Rathmines West) | Ben Briscoe | Fianna Fáil |
| Dublin South-Central | Seat added | | | | Gay Mitchell | Fine Gael |
| Dublin South-Central | Frank Cluskey | Labour | Lost seat | (O'Connell:from Dublin Ballyfermot) | John O'Connell | Independent |
| Dublin South-East | Seat added | | | (Brady: from Dublin Rathimines West) | Gerard Brady | Fianna Fáil |
| Dublin South-East | Ruairi Quinn | Labour | Lost seat | (Ryan: from Dublin Rathimines West) | Richie Ryan | Fine Gael |
| Dún Laoghaire | Liam Cosgrave | Fine Gael | Retired | | Liam T. Cosgrave | Fine Gael |
| Dún Laoghaire | Seat added | | | | Sean Barrett | Fine Gael |
| Galway East | John Donnellan | Fine Gael | (moved to Galway West) | | Paul Connaughton Snr | Fine Gael |
| Galway East | Mark Killilea Jnr | Fianna Fáil | (moved to Galway West) | Kitt: Former TD | Michael P. Kitt | Fianna Fáil |
| Galway East | Thomas Hussey | Fianna Fáil | Lost seat | Seat abolished | | |
| Galway West | John Mannion Jnr | Fine Gael | Retired | (Donnellan: from Galway East) | John Donnellan | Fine Gael |
| Galway West | Seat added | | | | Michael D. Higgins | Labour |
| Galway West | Bill Loughnane | Fianna Fáil | (moved to Clare) | (Killilea moved from Galway East) | Mark Killilea Jnr | Fianna Fáil |
| Kerry North | Kit Ahern | Fianna Fáil | Lost seat | | Denis Foley | Fianna Fáil |
| Kerry North | Dan Spring | Labour | Retired | | Dick Spring | Labour |
| Kerry South | Timothy O'Connor | Fianna Fáil | Lost seat | | Michael Moynihan | Labour |
| Kildare | Seat added | | | | Bernard Durkan | Fine Gael |
| Kildare | Seat added | | | | Alan Dukes | Fine Gael |
| Laois–Offaly | Patrick Lalor | Fianna Fáil | Retired | | Liam Hyland | Fianna Fáil |
| Limerick East | Michael Herbert | Fianna Fáil | Retired | | Peadar Clohessy | Fianna Fáil |
| Limerick East | Michael Lipper | Labour | Lost seat | | Jim Kemmy | Independent |
| Limerick East | Seat added | | | | Michael Noonan | Fine Gael |
| Limerick West | No membership changes | | | | | |
| Longford–Westmeath | Joseph Sheridan | Independent | Retired | Cooney: Former TD | Patrick Cooney | Fine Gael |
| Louth | Paddy Donegan | Fine Gael | Retired | | Bernard Markey | Fine Gael |
| Louth | Joseph Farrell | Fianna Fáil | Retired | Agnew: Anti H-Block. Republican prisoner in Long Kesh, not on hunger strike. | Paddy Agnew | Independent |
| Mayo East | No membership changes | | | | | |
| Mayo West | No membership changes | | | | | |
| Meath | Seat added | | | | John Farrelly | Fine Gael |
| Roscommon | Joan Burke | Fine Gael | Retired | | John Connor | Fine Gael |
| Sligo–Leitrim | James Gallagher | Fianna Fáil | Retired | | John Ellis | Fianna Fáil |
| Sligo–Leitrim | Eugene Gilhawley | Fine Gael | Retired | | Joe McCartin | Fine Gael |
| Sligo–Leitrim | Seat added | | | | Ted Nealon | Fine Gael |
| Tipperary North | Michael O'Kennedy | Fianna Fáil | Retired | | David Molony | Fine Gael |
| Tipperary South | Noel Davern | Fianna Fáil | Retired | | Carrie Acheson | Fianna Fáil |
| Tipperary South | Seat added | | | | Seán McCarthy | Fianna Fáil |
| Waterford | No membership changes | | | | | |
| Wexford | Seán Browne | Fianna Fáil | Lost seat | | Hugh Byrne | Fianna Fáil |
| Wexford | Seat added | | | | Ivan Yates | Fine Gael |
| Wicklow | Seat added | | | Brennan: Former TD | Paudge Brennan | Fianna Fáil |

== Seanad election ==
The Dáil election was followed by an election to the 15th Seanad.
