= Brian Fleming =

Irish former politician (born 1946)

Senator
- In office 23 February 1983 – 25 April 1987
- Constituency: Cultural and Educational Panel

Teachta Dála
- In office June 1981 – November 1982
- Constituency: Dublin West

Personal details
- Born: 20 July 1946 (age 79) County Dublin, Ireland
- Party: Fine Gael

Brian Fleming (born 20 July 1946) is an Irish former Fine Gael politician who served both as a Teachta Dála (TD) and as a Senator.

Fleming was elected to Dáil Éireann as a Fine Gael TD for the Dublin West constituency at the 1981 general election, and held the seat at the February 1982 general election. He lost his seat at the November 1982 general election and was an unsuccessful candidate at the 1987 general election.

From 1983 to 1987, he served as a member of Seanad Éireann, elected on the Cultural and Educational Panel.

Dáil	Election	Deputy (Party)	Deputy (Party)	Deputy (Party)	Deputy (Party)	Deputy (Party)
22nd	1981	Jim Mitchell (FG)	Brian Lenihan Snr (FF)	Richard Burke (FG)	Eileen Lemass (FF)	Brian Fleming (FG)
23rd	1982 (Feb)	Jim Mitchell (FG)	Brian Lenihan Snr (FF)	Richard Burke (FG)	Liam Lawlor (FF)	Brian Fleming (FG)
23rd	1982 by-election	Jim Mitchell (FG)	Brian Lenihan Snr (FF)	Liam Skelly (FG)	Liam Lawlor (FF)	Brian Fleming (FG)
24th	1982 (Nov)	Jim Mitchell (FG)	Brian Lenihan Snr (FF)	Liam Skelly (FG)	Eileen Lemass (FF)	Tomás Mac Giolla (WP)
25th	1987	Jim Mitchell (FG)	Brian Lenihan Snr (FF)	Pat O'Malley (PDs)	Liam Lawlor (FF)	Tomás Mac Giolla (WP)
26th	1989	Jim Mitchell (FG)	Brian Lenihan Snr (FF)	Austin Currie (FG)	Liam Lawlor (FF)	Tomás Mac Giolla (WP)
27th	1992	Joan Burton (Lab)	Brian Lenihan Snr (FF)	Austin Currie (FG)	Liam Lawlor (FF)	4 seats 1992–2002
27th	1996 by-election	Joan Burton (Lab)	Brian Lenihan Jnr (FF)	Austin Currie (FG)	Liam Lawlor (FF)	4 seats 1992–2002
28th	1997	Joe Higgins (SP)	Brian Lenihan Jnr (FF)	Austin Currie (FG)	Liam Lawlor (FF)	4 seats 1992–2002
29th	2002	Joe Higgins (SP)	Brian Lenihan Jnr (FF)	Joan Burton (Lab)	3 seats 2002–2011	
30th	2007	Leo Varadkar (FG)	Brian Lenihan Jnr (FF)	Joan Burton (Lab)	3 seats 2002–2011	
31st	2011	Leo Varadkar (FG)	Brian Lenihan Jnr (FF)	Joan Burton (Lab)	Joe Higgins (SP)	4 seats 2011–2024
31st	2011 by-election	Leo Varadkar (FG)	Patrick Nulty (Lab)	Joan Burton (Lab)	Joe Higgins (SP)	4 seats 2011–2024
31st	2014 by-election	Leo Varadkar (FG)	Ruth Coppinger (SP)	Joan Burton (Lab)	Joe Higgins (SP)	4 seats 2011–2024
32nd	2016	Leo Varadkar (FG)	Ruth Coppinger (AAA–PBP)	Joan Burton (Lab)	Jack Chambers (FF)	4 seats 2011–2024
33rd	2020	Leo Varadkar (FG)	Paul Donnelly (SF)	Roderic O'Gorman (GP)	Jack Chambers (FF)	4 seats 2011–2024
34th	2024	Emer Currie (FG)	Paul Donnelly (SF)	Roderic O'Gorman (GP)	Jack Chambers (FF)	Ruth Coppinger (PBP–S)
