= Tom Morrissey (politician) =

Irish former politician (born 1956)

Senator
- In office 12 September 2002 – 13 September 2007
- Constituency: Nominated by the Taoiseach

Personal details
- Born: July 1956 (age 69) County Dublin, Ireland
- Party: Progressive Democrats; Fine Gael

Thomas Morrissey (born July 1956) is a former Irish politician and businessman. He was nominated by the Taoiseach, Bertie Ahern to the 22nd Seanad in 2002 as a member of the Progressive Democrats. He was subsequently appointed to the Progressive Democrats front bench as Transportation spokesperson in September 2002. During his time as a senator, Morrissey served on the Joint Oireachtas Committee on Transport. He also served as chair of the Progressive Democrats parliamentary party.

Morrissey was first elected as a Fine Gael representative for the Castleknock area at the 1991 local elections with 1,172 votes (15.8%). He was an unsuccessful Dáil candidate for Fine Gael in Dublin West in the 1992 general election and 1996 by-election receiving 1,179 (3.2%) and 3,728 (13.1%) votes respectively. He then joined the Progressive Democrats and was unsuccessful in the 1997 and 2002 general elections in Dublin West. He received 7.6% in 1997 and 7.9% in 2002. His second successful local election was in 1999 when he was elected as a Progressive Democrats member for Fingal County Council, again in the Castleknock area receiving 1,218 votes (14.1%).

At the 2007 general election, he ran in the Dublin North constituency. He failed to be elected having received 1,355 votes (2.6%). His support for the privatisation of Aer Lingus may have been a factor on that occasion. In the same year, he also failed in his candidacy for Seanad Éireann.
