= Mick Murphy (Irish Socialist politician) =

Irish Socialist Party political activist

Cllr Mick Murphy

South Dublin County Councillor
- In office June 2004 – May 2019
- Constituency: Tallaght Central

Personal details
- Party: Anti-Austerity Alliance
- Other political affiliations: Socialist Party

Mick Murphy is a Socialist Party political activist who sat as a Tallaght Central representative on South Dublin County Council. It was Murphy who discovered the GAMA construction scandal, which was subsequently raised in Dáil Éireann and led to nationwide strikes.

== Political career ==
Murphy contested his first general election, for the Dublin South-West constituency, in 1997, finishing in ninth position. He was a candidate for the same constituency at the 2002, 2007 and 2011 general elections, finishing in seventh position. He spent three weeks in Mountjoy Prison in 2003 for his role in the Anti-Bin Tax Campaign.

It was Murphy who, upon travelling to Lucan to support three BATU workers in October 2004, discovered the GAMA construction scandal where Turkish workers were paid €2 an hour on publicly funded projects. After contacting the local council, GAMA and trade union officials and remaining unenlightened, Murphy wrote a leaflet in English, had it translated into Turkish "mainly to say that we had no problem with them being here, and saying what GAMA had said", then threw it over the hoarding surrounding the site where the men were living as well as working. When the truth emerged, Murphy "knew immediately we had a major scandal", he later said. Murphy brought it to the attention of his party colleague Joe Higgins, who was then a TD for Dublin West, and Higgins raised the matter in Dáil Éireann on 8 February 2005, bringing public awareness to the workers' plight.

During the 2010s, Murphy was to the fore in the Campaign Against Home and Water Taxes. On 9 February 2015, while travelling to work from his Whitechurch, Rathfarnham home, Gardaí arrested him in relation to his part in the Jobstown protest the previous November—during which Tánaiste Joan Burton was reluctant to leave her car for two hours—and took him into custody along with three other anti-austerity activists. He was released without charge later that afternoon and told RTÉ's Liveline radio show that while in custody he was shown garda vehicle and helicopter surveillance videos of the incident. The arrests led to accusations of "political policing".

As Tallaght Central representative he opposed the Tallaght Town Centre Development. He is also involved in the Tallaght Hospital Action Group.

Murphy lost his seat in the 2019 Irish local elections.

== Bibliography ==
- McDonald, Frank; Sheridan, Kathy (2009). The Builders. Penguin. ISBN 978-0-141-03780-6.
- Socialist Party Politicians: Joe Higgins, Mick Murphy, Clare Daly, Ruth Coppinger, Mick Barry. LLC. 2010. ISBN 978-1-159-33100-9.
