= Bríd Smith =

Irish politician (born 1958)

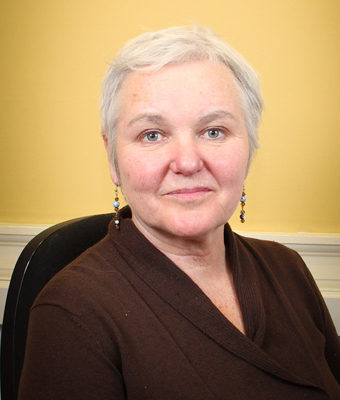
- Smith in 2016

Teachta Dála
- In office February 2016 – November 2024
- Constituency: Dublin South-Central

Personal details
- Born: 18 September 1961 (age 64) Rathfarnham, Dublin, Ireland
- Party: People Before Profit–Solidarity
- Other political affiliations: People Before Profit
- Website: bridsmith.net

Bríd Smith (born 18 September 1961) is an Irish former People Before Profit–Solidarity politician who served as a Teachta Dála (TD) for the Dublin South-Central constituency from 2016 to 2024.

== Early life and political activism ==
One of seven children, Smith grew up in Rathfarnham. Her parents were prominent in the Irish Republican movement, and her father was a trade unionist. In the 1980s, Smith worked as a librarian, but was sacked for not passing a picket. In the 1990s, Smith was a spokesperson for the Irish branch of the Anti-Nazi League.

In 2001, she was an ATGWU shop steward and secretary of the Campaign Against Partnership Deals. She was a spokesperson for the Anti-Bin Tax Campaign, and was jailed in 2003 as part of this campaign.She has addressed large crowds at demonstrations, such as the visit to Dublin by former British Prime Minister Tony Blair and the 2004 protests against the Iraq War. Smith was a long-time campaigner on repealing the 8th amendment to legalise abortion in Ireland, and has described its repeal as one of the highs of her career.

Smith was the first TD to discuss having an abortion, having terminated a pregnancy in the 1980s.

== Political career ==
Smith first contested a general election in 1997, when she ran for the Socialist Workers Party (SWP), receiving 0.54% of the vote in Dublin South-Central. She ran in Dublin South-Central again for the SWP at the following election in 2002, once again failing to be elected with 1.4% of the vote, before unsuccessfully running for the party in the 2004 local elections, placing fourth in a three-seat ward with 11.76% of the vote. In 2007, she ran in Dublin South-Central for a third time, this time for People Before Profit. She received an increased share of 4.39% of the vote but once again was not elected.

She was elected to Dublin City Council as a People Before Profit candidate for the Ballyfermot–Drimnagh local electoral area in 2009, and re-elected in 2014. Smith was director of elections for the People Before Profit at the 2011 general election. She stood as a candidate in the Dublin constituency at the 2014 European Parliament election, but was not elected, receiving 6.8% of the vote. Socialist Party leader Joe Higgins and incumbent MEP Paul Murphy suggested that Smith's candidacy had caused a split in the left vote and cost Murphy his seat.

Smith was elected as TD for Dublin South-Central at the 2016 general election, on her fourth attempt. On 10 March 2016, at the first sitting of the 32nd Dáil, she seconded the nomination of Richard Boyd Barrett for Taoiseach.

At the 2020 general election, Smith was re-elected as a TD for the Dublin South-Central constituency.

In July 2020, Smith was investigated by the Dáil Committee on Procedure for comments she made in the Dáil and online about High Court judge Garrett Simons, which were described by government TD Charles Flanagan as "an attack on democracy itself". The previous month, Smith had said in the Dáil that it was "a day when tens of thousands of workers will wake up to the realisation that a learned judge of the High Court, who earns more than €220,000 per year, has decided in his wisdom that an electrician who may earn €45,000 per year is possibly overpaid, and has then struck down a sectoral employment order that will affect tens of thousands of workers already on low pay. This is a war on workers, and it is time for workers to fight back."

In July 2023, Smith announced she would not contest the next general election. In January 2024 she was selected by People Before Profit to contest the 2024 European Parliament election for the Dublin constituency. Smith received 21,577 (5.7%) first preference votes but was not elected.

=== Political views ===
In 2010, Smith criticised health cuts implemented by the government at Cherry Orchard Hospital, and organised a protest against Mary Harney, on behalf of the Save Cherry Orchard Hospital Campaign. In 2009 she opposed the Treaty of Lisbon. In 2015 she opposed the alcohol industry's sponsorship of sporting events.

Smith opposes sanctions on Russia amidst the Russian invasion of Ukraine, saying that they "severely hurt the Russian people" and comparing them to the sanctions levelled against Iraq after the Iraq War.

Smith has expressed support for migrant workers in Ireland, discussing the 50,000 migrant workers in Ireland's health service and 27,000 in construction and asking "where would we be without them?" She has called the European response to the migration crisis "shameful".

== Election results ==
Elections to the Dáil
Party	Election		FPv	FPv%	Result
Socialist Workers Party	Dublin South-Central	1997	218	0.5	Eliminated on count 8/15
Socialist Workers Party	Dublin South-Central	2002	617	1.4	Eliminated on count 2/11
People Before Profit	Dublin South-Central	2007	2,086	4.4	Eliminated on count 5/10
AAA–PBP (Note: Smith was a member of People Before Profit.)	Dublin South-Central	2016	4,374	10.2	Elected on count 11/11
Solidarity–PBP	Dublin South-Central	2020	4,753	11.0	Elected on count 2/6

Dáil	Election	Deputy (Party)	Deputy (Party)	Deputy (Party)	Deputy (Party)	Deputy (Party)
13th	1948	Seán Lemass (FF)	James Larkin Jnr (Lab)	Con Lehane (CnaP)	Maurice E. Dockrell (FG)	John McCann (FF)
14th	1951	Seán Lemass (FF)	James Larkin Jnr (Lab)	Philip Brady (FF)	Maurice E. Dockrell (FG)	John McCann (FF)
15th	1954	Seán Lemass (FF)	James Larkin Jnr (Lab)	Thomas Finlay (FG)	Maurice E. Dockrell (FG)	Celia Lynch (FF)
16th	1957	Seán Lemass (FF)	Jack Murphy (Ind.)	Philip Brady (FF)	Maurice E. Dockrell (FG)	Celia Lynch (FF)
16th	1958 by-election	Seán Lemass (FF)	Patrick Cummins (FF)	Philip Brady (FF)	Maurice E. Dockrell (FG)	Celia Lynch (FF)
17th	1961	Seán Lemass (FF)	Patrick Cummins (FF)	Philip Brady (FF)	Maurice E. Dockrell (FG)	Joseph Barron (CnaP)
18th	1965	Seán Lemass (FF)	Frank Cluskey (Lab)	Philip Brady (FF)	Maurice E. Dockrell (FG)	Thomas J. Fitzpatrick (FF)
19th	1969	Richie Ryan (FG)	Ben Briscoe (FF)	Philip Brady (FF)	John O'Donovan (Lab)	4 seats 1969–1977
20th	1973	Richie Ryan (FG)	Ben Briscoe (FF)	Philip Brady (FF)	John Kelly (FG)	4 seats 1969–1977
21st	1977	Fergus O'Brien (FG)	Frank Cluskey (Lab)	Thomas J. Fitzpatrick (FF)	3 seats 1977–1981	
22nd	1981	Fergus O'Brien (FG)	Ben Briscoe (FF)	Thomas J. Fitzpatrick (FF)	Gay Mitchell (FG)	John O'Connell (Note: O'Connell served as Ceann Comhairle in the 22nd and 23rd Dáil from 1981 to 1983 and was returned automatically at the February 1982 and November 1982 general elections. He joined Fianna Fáil in January 1985.) (Ind.)
23rd	1982 (Feb)	Frank Cluskey (Lab)	Ben Briscoe (FF)	Thomas J. Fitzpatrick (FF)	Gay Mitchell (FG)	John O'Connell (Ind.)
24th	1982 (Nov)	Frank Cluskey (Lab)	Ben Briscoe (FF)	Fergus O'Brien (FG)	Gay Mitchell (FG)	John O'Connell (Ind.)
25th	1987	Frank Cluskey (Lab)	Ben Briscoe (FF)	Fergus O'Brien (FG)	Gay Mitchell (FG)	Mary Mooney (FF)
26th	1989	John O'Connell (FF)	Ben Briscoe (FF)	Fergus O'Brien (FG)	Gay Mitchell (FG)	Eric Byrne (WP)
27th	1992	John O'Connell (FF)	Ben Briscoe (FF)	Pat Upton (Lab)	Gay Mitchell (FG)	4 seats 1992–2002
27th	1994 by-election	Eric Byrne (DL)	Ben Briscoe (FF)	Pat Upton (Lab)	Gay Mitchell (FG)	4 seats 1992–2002
28th	1997	Seán Ardagh (FF)	Ben Briscoe (FF)	Pat Upton (Lab)	Gay Mitchell (FG)	4 seats 1992–2002
28th	1999 by-election	Seán Ardagh (FF)	Ben Briscoe (FF)	Mary Upton (Lab)	Gay Mitchell (FG)	4 seats 1992–2002
29th	2002	Seán Ardagh (FF)	Aengus Ó Snodaigh (SF)	Mary Upton (Lab)	Gay Mitchell (FG)	Michael Mulcahy (FF)
30th	2007	Seán Ardagh (FF)	Aengus Ó Snodaigh (SF)	Mary Upton (Lab)	Catherine Byrne (FG)	Michael Mulcahy (FF)
31st	2011	Eric Byrne (Lab)	Aengus Ó Snodaigh (SF)	Joan Collins (PBP)	Catherine Byrne (FG)	Michael Conaghan (Lab)
32nd	2016	Bríd Smith (AAA–PBP)	Aengus Ó Snodaigh (SF)	Joan Collins (Note: Founded Right to Change in May 2020.) (I4C)	Catherine Byrne (FG)	4 seats from 2016
33rd	2020	Bríd Smith (S–PBP)	Aengus Ó Snodaigh (SF)	Joan Collins (I4C)	Patrick Costello (GP)	4 seats from 2016
34th	2024	Catherine Ardagh (FF)	Aengus Ó Snodaigh (SF)	Máire Devine (SF)	Jen Cummins (SD)	4 seats from 2016
