= Dublin West by-election =

Dublin West by-election may refer to:

- 1996 Dublin West by-election
- 2011 Dublin West by-election
- 2014 Dublin West by-election
