= People Before Profit =

Irish political party

People Before Profit Pobal Seachas Brabús
- Abbreviation: PBP
- Leader: Richard Boyd Barrett
- Founded: 21 October 2005; 20 years ago
- Headquarters: 5 Henrietta Street, Dublin 1, Ireland
- Ideology: Trotskyism; Socialism; Anti-capitalism; Irish reunification
- Political position: Left-wing to far-left
- National affiliation: People Before Profit–Solidarity
- Affiliated groups: RISE; Socialist Workers Network; Marxist Republican Network
- Colours: Red
- Slogan: Fighting For Workers & Eco-Socialism
- Dáil Éireann: 2 / 174
- Northern Ireland Assembly: 1 / 90
- Local government in the Republic of Ireland: 9 / 949
- Local government in Northern Ireland: 2 / 462

Website
- www.pbp.ie

People Before Profit (Irish: Pobal Seachas Brabús, PBP) is a Trotskyist political party active in the Republic of Ireland and Northern Ireland. It was formed in October 2005 as the People Before Profit Alliance.

PBP supports the reunification of Ireland, though rejects the use of "unionist" and "nationalist" labels within the Northern Ireland Assembly. The party describes itself as eco-socialist.

Within the Republic of Ireland, PBP makes up part of the People Before Profit–Solidarity electoral alliance, with its TDs sitting as part of the Independents and Smaller Parties Group. The parliamentary leader and national spokesperson of the party is the TD Richard Boyd Barrett, who has held the roles since October 2024.

== History ==
=== As Socialist Environmental Alliance ===
Socialist Environmental Alliance was a party led by Goretti Horgan that operated between 2003 and 2008 before merging in People Before Profit

People Before Profit was established in 2005 as the People Before Profit Alliance by members of the Socialist Workers Party (SWP), a Trotskyist organisation affiliated to the International Socialist Tendency (IST). Its inaugural meeting took place on 21 October 2005. The Community & Workers Action Group (CWAG) in south Dublin joined the alliance in 2007 and brought along the party's first elected representative, Joan Collins, an anti–bin tax campaigner and former member of the Socialist Party. In February 2018, the SWP renamed itself the Socialist Workers Network (SWN) to reflect "a decision to focus on building People Before Profit, and within that to win and educate as many members as possible in revolutionary socialist politics."

The Socialist Environmental Alliance (SEA) was a political party which operated in Northern Ireland, based largely in the city of Derry.

The SEA contested the Northern Ireland Assembly 2003 election in the East Londonderry and Foyle seats (reflecting the party's Derry base). It polled poorly in East Londonderry, with candidate Marion Baur gaining 137 first preference votes (0.4% of the total), although in Foyle Eamonn McCann gained 2,257 first preference votes (5.5% of the total). Overall, SEA got 2,394 votes in the election, 0.35% of the total.

It contested the 2004 elections to the European Parliament, with Eamonn McCann as their candidate. He received 9,172 first preference votes (1.6% of the total votes cast). McCann then stood in the 2005 general election in the Foyle constituency, receiving 1,649 votes and winning 3.6% of the vote.

McCann again stood for the organisation in Foyle in the 2007 Assembly election, receiving 2,045 votes (4.98% of the total). The group was dissolved in 2008 with most of it folding into the People Before Profit Alliance.

=== As People before Profit ===
People Before Profit contested several constituencies in the 2007 general election, polling around 9,000 first preferences, with Richard Boyd Barrett—the candidate in the Dún Laoghaire constituency—missing a seat on the 10th and final count by 7,890 votes to 9,910. PBP unsuccessfully ran one candidate, Sean Mitchell, in the 2007 Northern Ireland Assembly election, polling 774 first preference votes (2.3% of the total) in the Belfast West constituency.

In May 2008, People Before Profit launched a campaign calling for a No vote on the Lisbon Treaty when it was put to the people.

In the Republic's 2009 local elections People Before Profit ran twelve candidates, including ten in County Dublin. It secured five seats in three of Dublin's four councils. As well as ten members of the SWP, Joan Collins and Pat Dunne of the CWAG ran in Dublin, and Donnie Fell (a former Waterford Crystal worker and trade union representative) in Waterford.

In the Republic's 2011 general election, both Richard Boyd Barrett and Joan Collins were elected to Dáil Éireann as TDs (deputies), running under a joint People Before Profit and United Left Alliance banner. PBP ran four candidates in the Northern Ireland Assembly election of May 2011, winning 5,438 first-preference votes between them but no seats in the new Assembly. Its most successful candidate in this election was Eamonn McCann, who received 3,120 first-preference votes, or 8% of the total, in Foyle. In the June 2011 Belfast West by-election, Gerry Carroll received 1,751 votes (7.6%), coming in third place and ahead of both unionist candidates.

In April 2013, Joan Collins TD and Cllr Pat Dunne left the group to form United Left, a political party with former Socialist Party TD Clare Daly.

In the May 2014 local elections, People Before Profit won 14 seats including two seats outside Dublin on Sligo and Wexford County Councils.

People Before Profit supported the successful Right2Water Ireland campaign against the introduction of water charges in Ireland, which was launched in 2014. By 2017 the scale of the campaign resulted in the suspension and ultimately the scrapping of the funding model. In the 2014 Belfast City Council election, Carroll became the first People Before Profit councillor elected in Northern Ireland, winning 3rd place in the Black Mountain DEA, with 1,691 1st Preference votes (12.1% of the vote).

Discussions were held in August 2015 with the Anti-Austerity Alliance about forming a new political grouping. On 17 September 2015, the two parties announced they had formally registered as a single political party for electoral purposes. The new organisation was called the Anti-Austerity Alliance–People Before Profit.

At the 2016 general election, Boyd Barrett was re-elected. He was joined by fellow People Before Profit candidates Gino Kenny and Bríd Smith. In May 2016, Carroll topped the poll in the Belfast West constituency at the 2016 Assembly Election with 8,299 votes (22.9%), almost 4,000 first-preference votes clear of his nearest challenger, Sinn Féin MLA Fra McCann (Sinn Féin was running five candidates). This victory secured People Before Profit with their first elected MLA. Eamonn McCann also took a seat in the constituency of Foyle. In 2017, Carroll retained his seat but with a much reduced vote (12.2%), while McCann lost his.

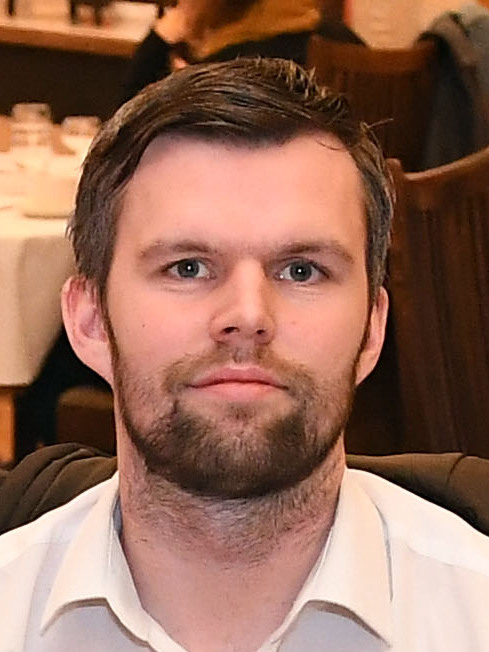
Gerry Carroll has represented People Before Profit in the Northern Irish Assembly since 2016

In January 2019, Dublin City Councillor John Lyons resigned from the party due to disputes with the leadership. Cllr Lyons subsequently was a leading figure in the foundation of Independent Left. He criticised his former party saying: "Solidarity and People Before Profit are the closest fit to us but have a hierarchical, carefully controlled internal life that is not fit for the purpose of socialist change."

The party gained four seats in the 2019 Northern Ireland Local Elections. People Before Profit won five council seats, three in Belfast City Council and two in Derry. The party stood two candidates in the 2019 United Kingdom general election, with their best performance being by Gerry Carroll in the Belfast West seat: he came second with 16%.

The party retained its three TDs in the 2020 Irish general election.

People Before Profit supported Debenhams Ireland workers in their 2020 industrial dispute.

On 28 February 2021, RISE, a democratic socialist party that had previously split from Solidarity in 2019, merged with People Before Profit. Paul Murphy became the party's 4th TD in the process. It maintains its media and functions as an internal organisation.

On 10 May 2021, the party announced that Dún Laoghaire–Rathdown Councillor Hugh Lewis was no longer a member of People Before Profit, "following an internal disciplinary procedure.

People Before Profit retained their single seat in the 2022 Northern Ireland Assembly election. They lost three of the five council seats they had had in the May 2023 Northern Ireland local elections, with 1.1% of the vote, down by 0.4 percentage points.

=== End of collective leadership, Red Network split, new factions ===
On 10 October 2024, the party announced that Richard Boyd Barrett had been selected to be the leader of the party, which before had been run as a collective leadership. The party said the reason behind selecting a leader was "offering a familiar face to identify the party with", "communicating the policies of the party in the media", and to be the spokesperson in the leaders' debates in the 2024 general election. PBP endorsed the "Vote Left, Transfer Left" pact at the 2024 Irish general election.

On 9 June 2025, Dublin PBP councillor Madeleine Johansson quit the party alongside roughly 30 to 40 other members of the sub-group Red Network amid concerns over talks about entering a coalition government with Sinn Féin. The Red Network argued against going into government with Sinn Féin, warning that such a government would ultimately preserve the existing state structures, and instead proposed "voting for a Sinn Féin led government externally and on a case by case basis". The group criticised PBP for becoming increasingly focused on appealing to middle-class voters and accused it of being politically incoherent, dominated by what they described as "student moralism", and jumping from one hot-button issue campaign to another. In addition, they accused PBP of engaging in "culture war" issues, emphasising instead the need to listen to the people of the estates. Red Network advocated that instead of focusing on the "fake democracy of the Dáil", PBP should seek a revolution towards a "32-county workers' republic". The Red Network called for greater political honesty about coalition plans and a clearer working-class socialist stance.

In August 2026, a new faction within People Before Profit was announced: the Marxist Republican Network (MRN), a group associated with Horizon Magazine. The network advocates transforming PBP into a mass, explicitly Marxist and class-independent communist party, while taking a revolutionary and republican position. It rejects the strategy of working with any other left-wing parties and calls for the dismantling of the existing political order. MRN rejects both the Good Friday Agreement and the Constitution of the Republic of Ireland, arguing that the existing Irish and British states must be dismantled and replaced by a 32-county constituent assembly. MRN rejects the idea of a border poll, calls for unconditional British withdrawal from Northern Ireland, and advocates opposition to "NATO, EU militarisation and American imperialism". MRN also calls for the dismantling of the EU and NATO, the creation of a socialist Europe, and eventually a classless communist society.

Also in August 2026, a group of 15 prominent People Before Profit members resigned from the Socialist Workers Network while remaining members of PBP. The resignations followed a letter accusing the SWN leadership of a "hegemonic" and "sect-based" culture that marginalised political differences and younger members from decision-making. Those departing include PBP councillor Conor Reddy, national organiser Aislinn Shanahan-Daly, and Dublin organisers Damian Kelly and Farah Parvazi, leaving the SWN with only one active member on PBP's six-person officer board. The dispute reportedly reflects a wider generational and strategic divide within the SWN, amid changing circumstances for PBP since its foundation in 2005. The departures have reportedly made Paul Murphy's Rise network and independent socialist Eddie Conlon the dominant group within PBP. The SWN has acknowledged the frustrations and said that former members had an "open door" to return.

== Ideology and policies ==
People Before Profit are a Trotskyist party committed to political agitation through working-class mass action in capitalist societies. However, People Before Profit do not accept this label, with their website stating that "Trotskyist is the Labour Party's bizarre code word for anyone with strong left-wing principles". The party self-claims to be an eco-socialist party. It described its 2022 AGM as a "positive step forward in building a major, pluralist eco-socialist party in Ireland" and described its party programme as eco-socialist.

In the Northern Ireland Assembly, the party's assembly members sign the register as "socialist" when asked if they are "unionist" or "nationalist", resulting in an official designation of "other" in the assembly. However the party is not neutral on constitutional matters, and are in favour of "a 32 county socialist Ireland." People Before Profit support a referendum on Irish reunification. This is in contrast to their alliance partners Solidarity who oppose the holding of a border poll.

People Before Profit have supported leaving the EU and campaigned for a 'Lexit' (a left-wing Brexit) in the 2016 EU referendum in Northern Ireland. Commenting on their pro-Brexit position, Gerry Carroll stated "We made a decision to say that the EU does not operate in the interests of working people anywhere, and the strongest example of that is Greece. What we need is a Brexit that is not shaped by Theresa May, we need one that is shaped by working-class people in Northern Ireland, England, Scotland and Wales. And one that is shaped by the trade union movement." Members of Sinn Féin criticised this stance, saying that supporting Brexit, tactically or otherwise, aligned People Before Profit with British parties such as the Conservatives, UKIP, the Democratic Unionist Party and Traditional Unionist Voice and regardless of People Before Profit's intentions, this would serve the pro-Brexit agenda. In response, Richard Boyd-Barrett tried to distance PBP's position from those parties, and noted that People Before Profit opposed a hard border, and would encourage "a movement of civil disobedience to remove border posts if they are imposed by either the UK government or the EU".

The party supports free public transport.

People Before Profit supports nationalising the "major Agri-corporations" and using them to finance a “just transition” for farmers and rural Ireland. People Before Profit also seeks to cut the national cow herd by 50% and pay farmers a green payment to offset this, provided a farmer doesn't earn more than €100,000 a year. People Before Profit seek to create a state-owned building corporation that would be used to retrofit existing homes.

People Before Profit supports the legalisation of cannabis for medical and general use. It states that it wants to "legislate for the use of medicinal cannabis for pain management of chronic conditions" and medical cannabis be "researched and made available as an evidence-based option for health care providers and patients". It also states that it wants the "non-commercialised legalisation of cannabis to be regulated by a new state body and dispensed via designated stores". In November 2022, Gino Kenny introduced a bill to legalise personal usage of cannabis, and possession of up to seven grams of cannabis.

In 2023, People Before Profit published a document which said that the Irish military and police force (Garda Siochana) would commit a coup d'état on behalf of "wealthy elites" against any prospective left-wing government that formed in Ireland.

=== Foreign policy ===
People Before Profit is opposed to NATO and support Irish neutrality. They have said that "the role of NATO expansion and the role of further potential NATO aggression" are partly to blame for the Russian invasion of Ukraine, which they consider "a conflict between two reactionary imperialist blocs", and accuse NATO of escalating the war "to the terrifying possibility that we could have a nuclear situation". PBP have condemned the invasion as "barbaric" and have supported taking in Ukrainian refugees.

People Before Profit calls for sanctions against Israel and support the Palestinian-led movement Boycott, Divestment and Sanctions (BDS). They have called for "a comprehensive package of economic, political and cultural sanctions against Israel for war crimes, ethnic cleansing and the crime of apartheid".

People Before Profit oppose sanctions against Russia for its invasion of Ukraine. Paul Murphy said they stand with Ukrainians "in their struggle against the Russian imperialist invasion", but said sanctions "are hurting ordinary Russians and are only bolstering the Putin regime". Simon Coveney and Neale Richmond of Fine Gael have suggested it is contradictory for PBP to support sanctions against Israel but not against Russia. Murphy responded "You have a call for [sanctions] coming from ordinary Palestinians, including Palestinians who live within the state of Israel and suffer apartheid". Although supporting Ukrainian resistance, PBP oppose sending weaponry or giving weapons training to the Ukrainian military.

== Party leadership ==
Years	Leader
October 2005 – 9 October 2024	Collective leadership
10 October 2024 – present	Richard Boyd Barrett

== Election results and governments ==
A logo used by the party

=== Northern Ireland ===
==== Northern Ireland Assembly elections ====
Election	Assembly	First preference votes	Vote %	Seats	Government
2007	3rd	774	0.1%	0 / 108	DUP–Sinn Féin–SDLP–UUP–Alliance
2011	4th	5,438	0.8%	0 / 108	DUP–Sinn Féin–UUP–SDLP–Alliance
2016	5th	13,761	2.0%	2 / 108	DUP–Sinn Féin
2017	6th	14,100	1.8%	1 / 90	DUP–Sinn Féin–SDLP–UUP–Alliance
2022	7th	9,798	1.2%	1 / 90	Sinn Féin-DUP–UUP–Alliance

==== United Kingdom House of Commons elections ====
Election	Votes	Vote %	Seats	Government
2010	2,936	0.0%	0 / 18	Conservative Party–Liberal Democrats
2015	7,854	0.0%	0 / 18	Conservative Party
2017	5,509	0.0%	0 / 18	Conservative Party with DUP confidence & supply
2019	7,526	0.0%	0 / 18	Conservative Party
2024	8,438	0.0%	0 / 18	Labour Party

==== United Kingdom House of Commons by-elections ====
Election (year)	Candidate	Votes	Vote %	Winning party
Belfast West (2011)	Gerry Carroll	1,751	7.6%	Sinn Féin

==== Northern Ireland local elections ====
Election	First preference votes	Vote %	Seats
2011	1,721	0.3%	0 / 583
2014	1,923	0.3%	1 / 462
2019	9,478	1.4%	5 / 462
2023	8,059	1.0%	2 / 462

=== Republic of Ireland ===
==== Dáil Éireann elections ====
Election	Leader	FPv	%	Seats	%	±	Dáil	Government
2007	Collective leadership	9,333	0.5 (#8)	0 / 166	—N/a	New	30th	No seats 27th, 28th government (FF-GP-PD/Ind majority)
2011	Collective leadership	21,551	1.0 (#8)	2 / 166	1.2 (#5)	▲2	31st	Opposition; 29th government (FG-Lab supermajority)
2016 (Note: Contested election as Anti-Austerity Alliance–People Before Profit.)	Collective leadership	42,174	2.0 (#8)	3 / 158	1.9 (#7)	▲1	32nd	Opposition; 30th, 31st government (FG-Ind minority)
2020 (Note: Contested election as Solidarity–People Before Profit. Figures also contain RISE which was not part of People Before Profit until February 2021.)	Collective leadership	44,697	2.1 (#8)	4 / 160	2.5 (#7)	▲1	33rd	Opposition; 32nd, 33rd, 34th government (FF-FG-GP majority)
2024 (Note: Contested election as People Before Profit–Solidarity.)	Richard Boyd Barrett	49,344	2.2 (#9)	2 / 174	1.2 (#7)	▼2	34th	Opposition; 35th government (FF-FG-Ind majority)

==== Presidential elections ====
Election	Candidate	1st pref. votes	%	+/–	Position
2025	Supported Catherine Connolly as an independent				

==== Dáil Éireann by-elections ====
Election (year)	Candidate	First preference votes	Vote %	Winning party
Dublin South-West (2014)	Nicky Coules	530	2.2%	Anti-Austerity Alliance
Carlow–Kilkenny (2015)	Adrienne Wallace	2,377	3.6%	Fianna Fáil
Dublin Mid-West (2019)	Kellie Sweeney (Note: PBP-S candidate)	983	5.1%	Sinn Féin
Wexford (2019)	Cinnamon Blackmore	659	1.6%	Fianna Fáil
Dublin Bay South (2021)	Brigid Purcell	759	2.8%	Labour
Dublin Central (2026)	Eoghan Ó Ceannabháin	1,681	6.8%	Social Democrats
Galway West (2026)	Denman Rooke	540	1.1%	Fine Gael

==== Local elections ====
Election	First preference votes	Vote %	Seats
2009	15,879	0.8%	5 / 883
2014	29,051	1.7%	14 / 949
2019	21,972	1.29%	7 / 949
2024	22,231	1.21%	10 / 949

==== European Parliament elections ====
People Before Profit have only contested European elections in the Republic of Ireland.

Election	Leader	1st pref Votes	%	Seats	+/−	EP Group
2019 (Note: Run as part of the People Before Profit–Solidarity coalition.)	Collective leadership	38,771	2.31 (#7)	0 / 13	New	−
2024	Collective leadership	31,802	1.82 (#11)	0 / 14	0	−
