= Garrett Simons =

Irish barrister, High Court judge since 2018

The Hon. Mr. Justice Garrett Simons

Judge of the High Court
- Incumbent
- Assumed office 13 November 2018
- Nominated by: Government of Ireland
- Appointed by: Michael D. Higgins

Personal details
- Education: Trinity College Dublin; King's Inns

Garrett Simons is an Irish judge who has served as a Judge of the High Court since November 2018. He formerly practised as a barrister, specialising in environmental and planning law.

== Early life ==
Simons attended Trinity College Dublin where he studied law and received an LLB in 1992. He developed an interest in environmental law during his studies. He was subsequently educated at the King's Inns.

== Legal career ==
He was called to the Bar in 1996 and became a Senior Counsel in 2007. Prior to commencing practice as a barrister, he worked at the High Court and the Supreme Court of Ireland as a research assistant.

His practice was focused on Public Administration Law and Immigration Law. He represented Ireland in the European Court of Justice in 2008 in a failure to fulfil obligations case taken by the European Commission. He appeared for Ian Bailey, a suspect in the death of Sophie Toscan du Plantier, in extradition proceedings initiated by France.

He appeared for Michael Bailey and Bovale Developments at the Planning Tribunal. He represented U2 and Seán Dunne in separate disputes against the Dublin Docklands Development Authority.

He provided legal advice to Irish Water in 2016, which said Ireland would not be able to abolish water charges due to the Water Framework Directive.

In addition to his legal practice, Simons wrote an academic text Planning and Development Law and was on the editorial board of the Irish Law Reports Monthly. He has lectured at Trinity College Dublin and the King's Inns.

In response to a query from The Irish Times in 2011, he advocated for the formation of barristers' chambers in Ireland, as opposed to the current system of sole practitioners.

== Judicial career ==
Simons became a High Court judge in November 2018.

On the bench in the High Court, he has heard cases involving company law, EU citizenship law, injunctions, planning and environmental law, the Hague Convention, judicial review, personal injuries, orders for possession, and insolvency law. In 2019, he set aside regulations which permitted the industrial extraction of peat from bogs, as the regulations were inconsistent with the Habitats Directive and Directives on Environmental impact assessment.

In June 2020, he issued a judgment which ruled that Chapter 3 of the Industrial Relations (Amendment) Act 2015 was unconstitutional as it conferred too broad discretion on the Minister for Business, Enterprise and Innovation. This had the effect of invalidating Sectoral Employment Orders which applied to workers in certain sectors. The decision led to Bríd Smith, a TD for People Before Profit, to describe the decision as a "declaration of war" and said that Simons was "right-wing" and "upper class". Her remarks were condemned by the Minister for Justice and Equality Charles Flanagan, President of the Association of Judges of Ireland and High Court judge David Barniville, the President of the Law Society of Ireland, and the chairman of the Bar Council. Smith defended her remarks and said the reaction was "hysterical".
