= The Socialist (Irish newspaper) =

Monthly political newspaper of Ireland's Socialist Party

- The Socialist front page from January 2012
- Type: Monthly political newspaper
- Political alignment: Socialist Party
- Language: English
- Circulation: Unknown
- Website: socialistparty.ie/

The Socialist is the official newspaper of the Socialist Party in Ireland. It is published monthly and is also available online.

The newspaper first appeared intermittently in the early 1990s following the expulsion of members of Militant tendency from the Labour Party. The grouping became known as Militant Labour and later, the Socialist Party.

The paper describes itself as providing a unique socialist analysis of political events. It frequently covers workers rights, human rights and trade union issues along with international affairs and political commentary.

== See also ==
- The Starry Plough
