= People Before Profit–Solidarity =

Irish electoral alliance

- Abbreviation: PBPS or PBP–S
- Leader: Collective leadership
- Founded: 2015; 11 years ago
- Preceded by: United Left Alliance (Note: The United Left Alliance was an electoral alliance created for the 2011 election and dissolved soon after. PBP-S was created in 2015 to maintain speaking rights in the Dáil and state funding for both parties. The two shared some members but PBP-S is not considered to be a direct successor to the ULA.)
- Ideology: Socialism; Trotskyism; Left-wing populism
- Political position: Left-wing to far-left
- Colours: Magenta (since 2024)
- Members: People Before Profit; Solidarity; RISE (Note: Part of People Before Profit); Socialist Workers Network
- Dáil Éireann: 3 / 174
- Local government (Note: The seat count includes People Before Profit and Solidarity.): 12 / 949

Website
- pbp.ie; letusrise.ie; solidarity.ie

People Before Profit–Solidarity (PBPS or PBP–S) is a left-wing electoral alliance in Ireland. It was formed by members of two Trotskyist political parties, People Before Profit (PBP) and Solidarity. The pairing was called People Before Profit–Anti-Austerity Alliance or PBP–AAA until the AAA renamed to Solidarity in 2017. PBPS also included the RISE party, founded by Paul Murphy in September 2019, until RISE became fully integrated into PBP in early 2021. The PBP–AAA alliance was formed in 2015 and replaced AAA and PBP in Ireland's official register of political parties; however, each entity retains its separate organisation and identity, and PBP also retains its own registration in Northern Ireland. The alliance was created to obtain more speaking rights for its constituent members in Dáil Éireann after the 2016 Irish general election. Since the 2024 general election, the alliance has been a part of the Independents and Smaller Parties technical group.

Both PBP and the Socialist Party (SP) are all-Ireland organisations but do not form part of a single electoral alliance in elections in Northern Ireland. PBP contests elections under its own name, while the SP is part of the Cross-Community Labour Alternative. The electoral alliance between PBP and Solidarity supports socialism and eco-socialism, and promotes Irish reunification through a socialist European federation.

== Background ==
Under the standing rules of order in Dáil Éireann, a parliamentary group must have five TDs or more in order to have full speaking rights. In addition, political parties which get 2% or more of the national vote receive extra funding from the state for political activities. Combining the seats and votes of People Before Profit and Anti-Austerity Alliance would increase the chance of reaching these thresholds. An electoral alliance called United Left Alliance had been previously tried by People Before Profit and other left-wing groups in the early 2010s, and in many ways served as a precursor to this alliance.

The electoral alliance sought to provide a greater socialist voice in parliament, and a political platform committed to abolishing water charges, Universal Social Charge for low-middle income earners, and other austerity measures implemented in Ireland. The alliance claims to represent the 57% of people who boycotted the payment of water charges, and claims to provide a genuine working-class voice in parliament. The alliance has been described as a "remarkable abeyance of decades-old sectarian conflict between the Socialist Workers Party underlying PBP and the Socialist Party underlying AAA." Solidarity and People Before Profit announced its intention to organise separately and to remain free to maintain different political positions on various issues, but intend to cooperate electorally while maintaining their own identities and structures.

AAA de-registered as a party, while PBP changed its registered name to AAA–PBP and added AAA members to the renamed party's list of nominated representatives. This technical distinction caused a legal question regarding the co-option of a member of Cork City Council to replace AAA member Mick Barry after Barry's election to the Dáil in the 2016 election. It was argued that, since the party for whom Barry was elected in 2014 was no longer registered, the party he represented when vacating his council seat in 2016 did not have the right to nominate a replacement. Harry McGee, a columnist for The Irish Times, commented that it was difficult to tell the difference between People Before Profit and the AAA.

In 2019, Solidarity TD Paul Murphy formed RISE, a new political party which immediately became the alliance's third member. RISE later merged with People Before Profit in February 2021. In 2020, the group changed its registered name to People Before Profit–Solidarity, in accordance with founding agreement that the order of names would switch after the first three years.

As of July 2024, People Before Profit–Solidarity is listed as one party in the Electoral Commission register of political parties. It was described as a party by RTÉ in September 2024.

== Electoral history ==
Ahead of the 2016 Irish general election, there were four AAA–PBP TDs: Joe Higgins, Richard Boyd Barrett, Ruth Coppinger and Paul Murphy. Boyd Barrett was first elected to the Dáil at the 2011 Irish general election, while Coppinger and Murphy were both elected at by-elections, in May and October 2014, respectively. Higgins retired with the dissolution of the 31st Dáil, while the other three sought re-election. They ran 31 candidates at the 2016 Irish general election. On 25 January 2016, the group launched a set of "common principles", and later released separate party manifestos. Six TDs were elected.

At the 2019 Irish local elections, Solidarity–PBP won 11 seats, a loss of 17 seats from their combined total at the 2014 Irish local elections. At 2020 Irish general election, Solidarity–PBP returned five TDs: three from PBP, one from RISE, and one from Solidarity.

=== Dáil Éireann ===
Election	FPv	%	Seats	%	±	Dáil	Government
2016 (Note: Contested election as Anti-Austerity Alliance–People Before Profit.)	84,168	3.9 (#5)	6 / 158	3.8 (#5)	▲2	32nd	Opposition; 30th, 31st government (FG-Ind minority)
2020 (Note: Contested election as Solidarity–People Before Profit.)	57,420	2.6 (#7)	5 / 160	3.1 (#6)	▼1	33rd	Opposition; 32nd, 33rd, 34th government (FF-FG-GP majority)
2024 (Note: Contested election as People Before Profit–Solidarity.)	62,481	2.8 (#9)	3 / 174	1.7 (#7)	▼2	34th	Opposition; 35th government (FF-FG-Ind majority)

=== Local elections ===
Election	1st pref votes	%	Seats	±
2019	32,883	1.9	11 / 949	▼17
2024	22,231	1.5	13 / 949	▲2

=== European Parliament ===
Election	Leader	1st pref Votes	%	Seats	+/−	EP Group
2019	Collective leadership	38,771	2.31 (#7)	0 / 13	New	−
2024	Collective leadership	31,802	1.82 (#11)	0 / 14	0	−

== See also ==
- United Left Alliance, similar pre-2011 electoral alliance
- United Left (Ireland)
