= 2014 Dublin West by-election =

By-election to the 31st Dáil

- 23 May 2014
- Turnout: 29,350 (46.2%)
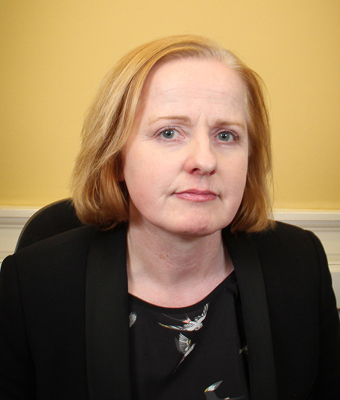

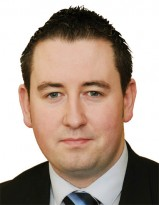

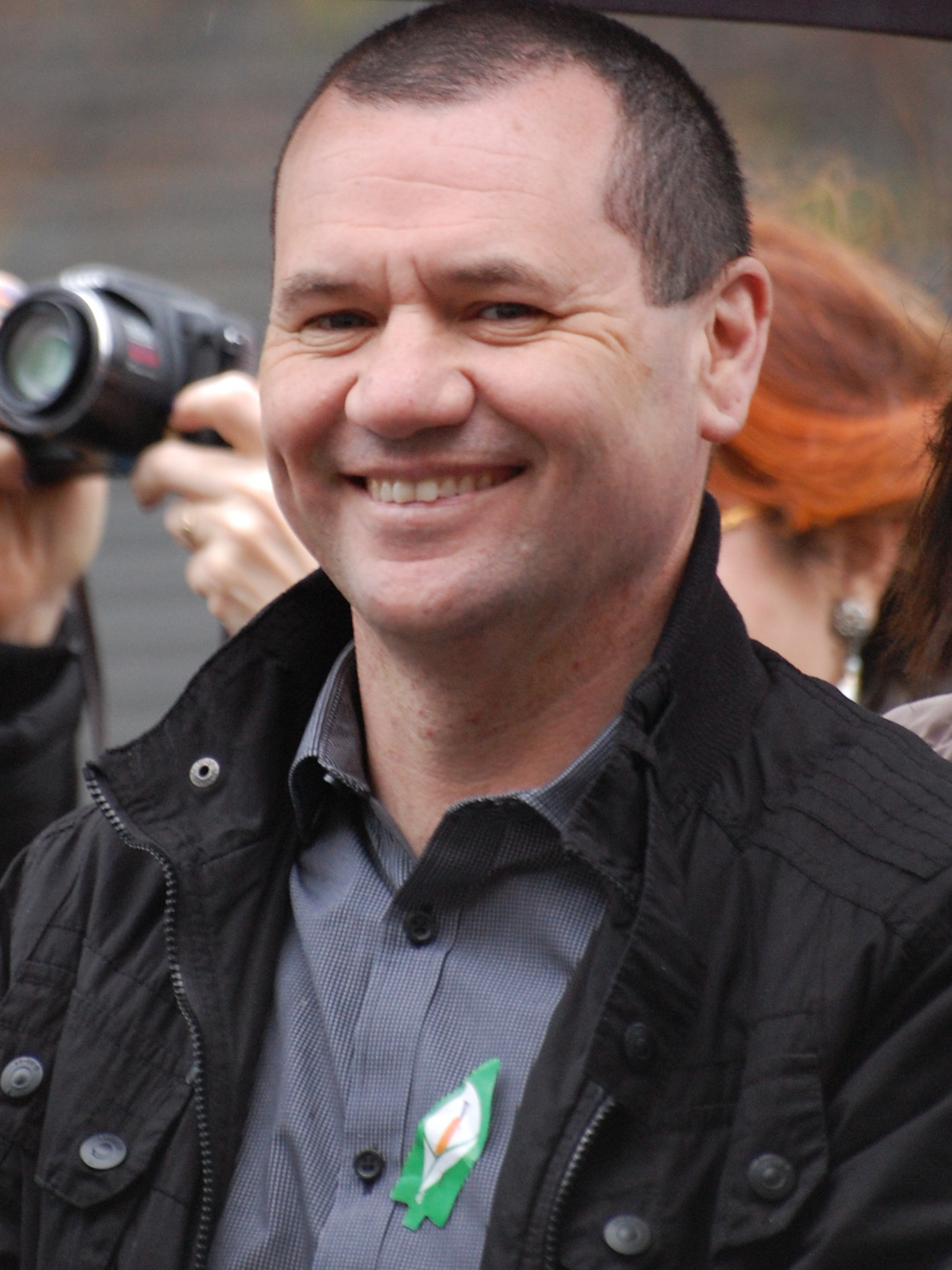
Nominee	Ruth Coppinger	David McGuinness	Paul Donnelly
Party	Socialist Party	Fianna Fáil	Sinn Féin
First pref	5,977	5,053	6,056
Percentage	20.6%	17.5%	20.9%
Final count	12,334	9,237	–
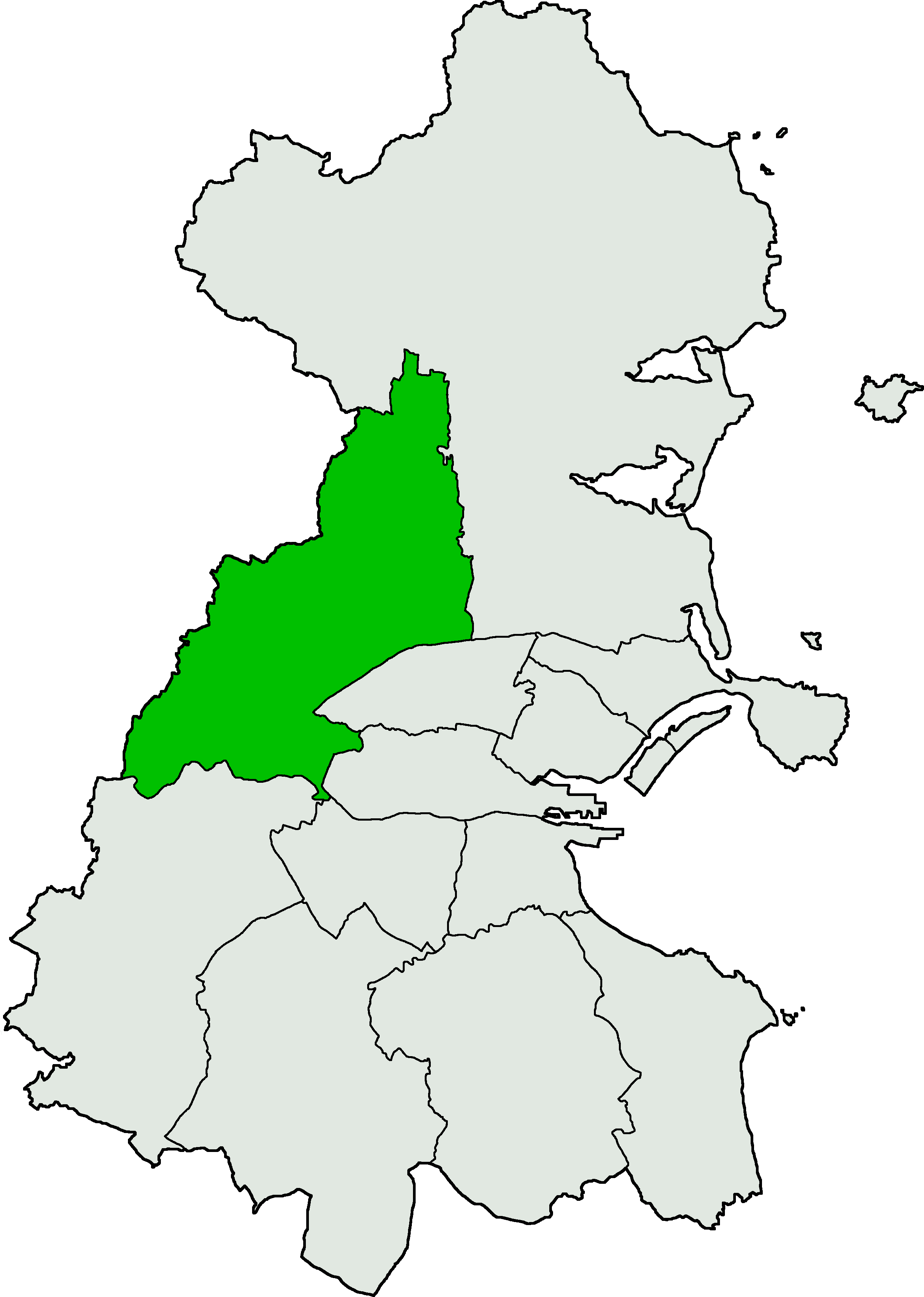
- Dublin West shown within County Dublin
TD before election
Patrick Nulty
Independent
TD after election
Ruth Coppinger
Socialist Party

A Dáil by-election was held in the constituency of Dublin West in Ireland on Friday, 23 May 2014, to fill a vacancy in the 31st Dáil. It followed the resignation of independent Teachta Dála (TD) Patrick Nulty (Note: Nulty was elected as a Labour TD at the 2011 Dublin West by-election before leaving the party in June 2013.) on 22 March 2014.

It was held on the same day as the 2014 European and local elections, and the Longford–Westmeath by-election.

The Electoral (Amendment) Act 2011 stipulates that a by-election in Ireland must be held within six months of a vacancy occurring.

Socialist Party candidate Ruth Coppinger was elected on the sixth count.

This was the second by-election in Dublin West during the 31st Dáil.

== Result ==
2014 Dublin West by-election
Party	Candidate	FPv%	Count					
Party	Candidate	FPv%	1	2	3	4	5	6
Sinn Féin	Paul Donnelly	20.9	6,056	6,120	6,296	6,516	7,028	
Socialist Party	Ruth Coppinger	20.6	5,977	6,112	6,744	7,342	8,807	12,334
Fianna Fáil	David McGuinness	17.5	5,053	5,156	5,691	6,789	8,163	9,237
Independent	David Hall	13.1	3,803	4,133	4,783	5,846		
Fine Gael	Eamonn Coghlan	12.8	3,715	3,788	4,693			
Green	Roderic O'Gorman	6.4	1,856	1,951				
Labour	Lorraine Mulligan	5.2	1,505	1,540				
Independent	Seán Lyons	2.2	649					
Independent	John Kidd	0.8	228					
Fís Nua	Daniel Boyne	0.4	113					
Electorate: 63,521 Valid: 28,955 Spoilt: 395 (1.4%) Quota: 14,478 Turnout: 29,350 (46.2%)
