= ROSA (organisation) =

- Founder: Ruth Coppinger
- Founded: 3 March 2013
- Headquarters: 141 Thomas Street, Dublin 8, Ireland
- Ideology: Socialist feminism
- Affiliations: Socialist Party; International Socialist Alternative

Website
- https://rosaireland.nationbuilder.com/

ROSA, also known as ROSA Socialist Feminist Movement, is a socialist feminist organisation that was founded in Ireland in 2013 by members of the Trotskyist Socialist Party. It took part in the campaign to legalise abortion in Ireland. An international organisation, ROSA International Socialist Feminists, was started in 2020.

== Establishment ==
ROSA was founded in Ireland on International Women's Day, 8 March 2013 as a socialist feminist organisation. It was established by members of the Trotskyist Socialist Party to campaign for the repeal of the constitutional ban on abortion in Ireland. The organisation is named in honour of Rosa Parks and Rosa Luxemburg, although it sometimes uses the backronym "Reproductive rights, against Oppression, Sexism and Austerity".

ROSA is a pro-choice organisation and is trans inclusive, supporting trans rights.

== Affiliations ==
An international organisation, ROSA International Socialist Feminists, was started in 2020. ROSA International is a member of the International Socialist Alternative, an international association of Trotskyist parties and organisations.

== Campaigning in Ireland ==
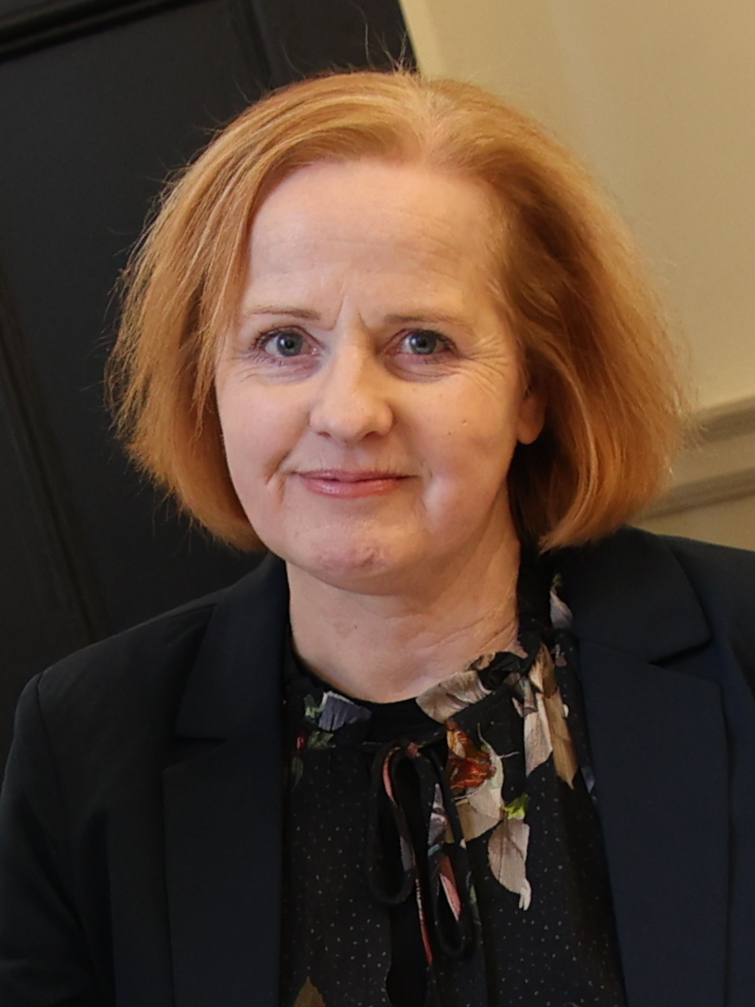
ROSA's most prominent member is Ruth Coppinger, a member of Dáil Eireann.

ROSA gained attention in Ireland through direct action campaigns, such as the "abortion pill bus" tours and public demonstrations calling for the repeal of the Eighth Amendment, which restricted access to abortion in Ireland. ROSA played a role in the broader pro-choice movement leading up to the 2018 referendum that legalised abortion. ROSA has also campaigned in Northern Ireland, where in May 2018, they staged a direct action outside Laganside Courts in Belfast. During the protest, three ROSA activists publicly took abortion pills in defiance of Northern Ireland's strict abortion laws. The event was held to draw attention to the lack of abortion access in the region and to call for legislative reform.

Beyond reproductive rights, ROSA has campaigned on issues including gender-based violence, workplace inequality, LGBT rights, and housing. In June 2024, ROSA protested in support of Natasha O'Brien and her case against a Defence Forces soldier who assaulted her. ROSA criticised what it described as a misogynistic judicial system after her attacker received a suspended sentence. The group organised a demonstration outside Limerick Courthouse during Judge Tom O'Donnell's final court sitting before retirement, and joined wider protests taking place across multiple Irish cities.

In late November 2024, ROSA organised a protest in Dublin to express solidarity with Nikita Hand, who had recently won a civil case against MMA fighter Conor McGregor. The demonstration, which coincided with the International Day for the Elimination of Violence against Women, aimed to highlight systemic issues in how gender-based violence is addressed in Ireland and to support survivors of sexual assault. Participants marched through the city, chanting slogans and carrying banners denouncing victim blaming and calling for justice.

In May 2025, ROSA initiated a march for trans rights in Belfast, which was attended by 3,000 people.
