= Ruth Coppinger =

Irish politician (born 1967)

Ruth Coppinger TD
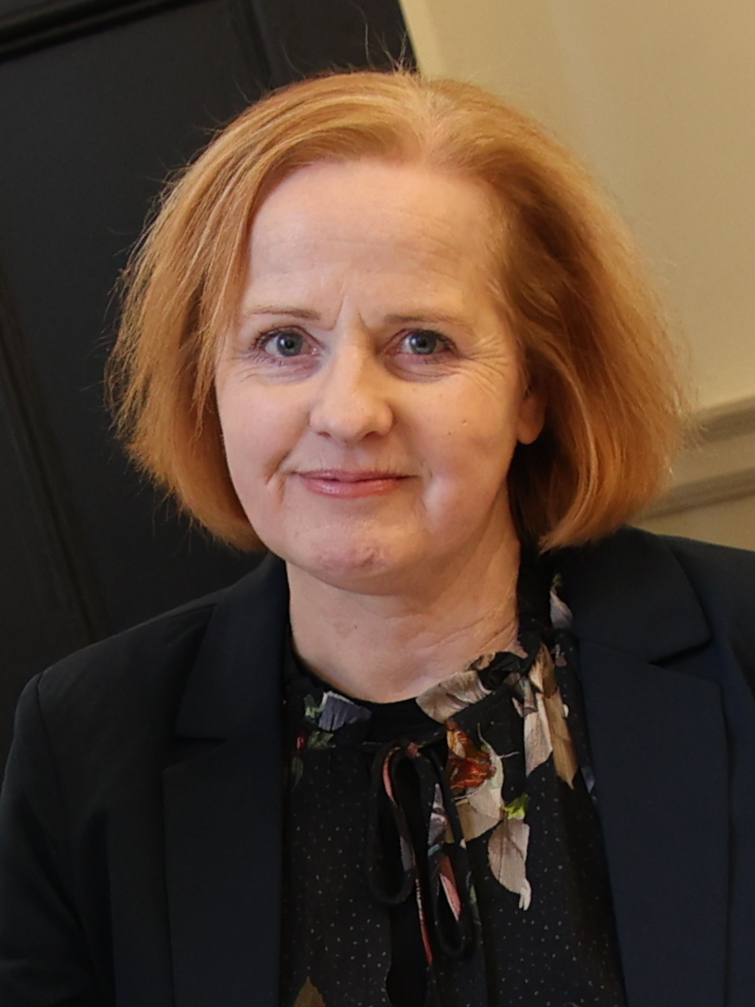
- Coppinger in 2024

Teachta Dála
- Incumbent
- Assumed office November 2024
- In office May 2014 – February 2020
- Constituency: Dublin West

Personal details
- Born: 18 April 1967 (age 59) Dublin, Ireland
- Party: People Before Profit–Solidarity
- Other political affiliations: Solidarity; Socialist Party; ROSA
- Spouse: Imran Khan (m. 2007; died 2024)
- Children: 1
- Education: University College Dublin

Ruth Coppinger (born 18 April 1967) is an Irish politician and member of the Socialist Party, and Teachta Dála (TD) for the Dublin West constituency. She was first elected in 2014, was re-elected in 2016 general election, as a candidate for Anti-Austerity Alliance–People Before Profit. She lost her seat at the general election in February 2020, but was re-elected in 2024.

== Political career ==
=== Councillor (2003–2014) ===
Coppinger was a member of Fingal County Council for the Mulhuddart local electoral area from 2003 to 2014. She was co-opted to the council in 2003, replacing Joe Higgins. She was elected in 2004 and re-elected in 2009. She was an unsuccessful candidate for the Socialist Party at the 2011 Dublin West by-election.

In March 2013 Coppinger became a founding member of ROSA, a socialist feminist organisation which, amongst other things, began advocating for abortion rights in Ireland.

=== TD (2014–2020) ===
Following victory in the 2014 Dublin West by-election, Coppinger joined her party colleague Joe Higgins in the Dáil After being elected, she called for a mass campaign of opposition to water charges being implemented by the Fine Gael-Labour Party coalition.

In November 2014, she called for the gradual nationalisation of US multinationals to prevent job losses. In response, Fianna Fáil’s jobs spokesperson Dara Calleary called the idea “reckless and ludicrous”, as it would "place a massive burden on taxpayers and the public finances.".

In September 2015, she joined homeless families from Blanchardstown, in occupying a Nama-controlled property as part of a campaign to raise awareness of the housing crisis. In October 2015, she joined families in their occupation of a show house in her constituency, to protest at the lack of availability of affordable social housing. She has also supported the tenants of Tyrrelstown, who were made homeless when a Goldman Sachs vulture fund sold their houses.

She was re-elected to the Dáil at the 2016 general election, this time under the Anti-Austerity Alliance–People Before Profit banner. On 10 March 2016, at the first sitting of the 32nd Dáil, she nominated Richard Boyd Barrett for the office of Taoiseach, quoting James Connolly from a hundred years previously when she said: "The day has passed for patching up the capitalist system. It must go" and declaring: "We will not vote for the identical twin candidates" of Fine Gael and Fianna Fáil after they "imposed austerity". On 6 April 2016, following the failure of the Dáil to elect a Taoiseach at that first sitting, Coppinger was nominated for the role of Taoiseach, becoming the first female nominee in the history of the state.

In April 2018, in the lead-up to the repeal of the Eighth Amendment, Coppinger along with her colleague Paul Murphy held up a Repeal sign during leader's questions and was reprimanded by the Ceann Comhairle. Coppinger is an advocate for abortion rights in Ireland; in 2016, Coppinger tabled the private members' motion to repeal the 8th amendment.

In November 2018, Coppinger protested in the Dáil against the conduct of a rape trial in Ireland. During the trial, the defence team, as part of their argument that the sex had been consensual, stated that the 17-year-old victim had worn a thong with a lace front. The defendant was subsequently found not guilty. During a sitting of the Dáil, Coppinger held up a similar pair of underwear and admonished the conduct of the trial, suggesting victim-blaming tactics had been used and suggested this was a routine occurrence in Irish courts. She called on the Taoiseach Leo Varadkar to support her party's bill that would increase sex education in Irish schools and provide additional training to the Irish judiciary and jurors on how to handle cases of rape. Varadkar responded that victims should not be blamed for what happens to them, irrespective of how they are dressed, where they are or if they have consumed alcohol.

In 2019 she sponsored a private member's bill – the Domestic Violence (No-contact order) (Amendment) Bill 2019. The bill lapsed with the dissolution of the Dáil and Seanad.

At the general election in February 2020, Coppinger was defeated in the Dublin West constituency. She unsuccessfully contested the 2020 Seanad election for the NUI constituency.

=== Councillor (2024) ===
In June 2024, Coppinger was elected to Fingal County Council for the Castleknock local electoral area on the 7th Count.

=== TD (2024–present) ===
At the 2024 general election, Coppinger was elected to the Dáil.

In April 2025 Coppinger alleged on the Dáil record, and in public statements, that she personally knew pro-Palestinian protesters who had been unfairly "stripped-searched" and in one case subjected to a "cavity search" during arrests made at a protest outside the Dáil on 1 April. On 15 April the Minister for Justice Jim O'Callaghan stated that an investigation had been carried out, and he alleged that he had video evidence (CCTV footage) proving that no such searches had taken place. Furthermore, Fiosrú (formerly the Garda Síochána Ombudsman Commission) never received a formal complaint about any alleged searches. Coppinger stood by her statement, asserting she believed the women's accounts and questioned why such allegations would be fabricated. Garda Commissioner Drew Harris stated that he intends to write a letter of complaint to the Ceann Comhairle in regard to Coppinger's Dáil statements.

In May 2025, Coppinger and Paul Murphy sparked controversy when they refused to answer questions from Gript journalist Ben Scallan during a press event outside Leinster House, stating that Gript was not a legitimate news outlet but a propaganda arm of violent right-wing extremism. Their refusal, despite Gript being a member of the Press Council of Ireland, drew backlash from journalists who argued that elected representatives have a duty to engage with all accredited media. Coppinger later apologised for calling journalists "very pathetic" in a tweet, acknowledging the tone was inappropriate, though she and Murphy maintained that they had the right to avoid media they considered disingenuous. Amongst those critical of Coppinger and Murphy's stance were the Irish Examiner, the Irish Times, and journalists Matt Cooper and Ivan Yates.

In February 2026, Coppinger raised in Dáil Éireann the case of a female University College Dublin (UCD) medical student who alleged she had been raped by a fellow student and that an intimate image of her, taken without her consent, had subsequently been circulated to UCD staff and students. She raised the case again on 25 February 2026, arguing that UCD was preventing the student from continuing her degree. Coppinger's intervention attracted substantial national coverage and criticism of UCD. In March 2026, in response to a question from Coppinger, Minister for Health Jennifer Carroll MacNeill told the Dáil that the Medical Council was engaging with the parties involved.

== Election results ==
Elections to the Dáil
Party	Election		FPv	FPv%	Result
Socialist Party	Dublin West	2011 by-election	7,542	21.1	Eliminated on count 4/5
Socialist Party	Dublin West	2014 by-election	5,977	20.6	Elected on count 6/6
AAA–PBP (Note: Coppinger was a member of Anti-Austerity Alliance.)	Dublin West	2016	6,520	15.5	Elected on count 5/5
Solidarity–PBP (Note: Coppinger is a member of Solidarity.)	Dublin West	2020	4,353	10.0	Eliminated on count 6/6
PBP–Solidarity	Dublin West	2024	3,552	8.0	Elected on count 13/13

== Political views ==
Coppinger is an advocate of secularism and believes in abolishing both the Angelus and the Dáil prayer, viewing them as relics of an outdated intertwining of religion and governance. She supports the separation of Church and State, criticising the Catholic Church's historical influence in education and health, as well as its financial privileges, including exemptions from accountability under regulations like SIPO. She has called for the requisitioning of Church lands and property, citing the Church's failure to meet commitments to abuse victims and the necessity of addressing historical injustices.

On drug policy, Coppinger supports decriminalisation and endorses the Portuguese model, which treats addiction as a health issue rather than a criminal matter. She emphasises the hypocrisy of criminalising drug use while overlooking the societal harm caused by alcohol and advocates for expanding access to medicinal cannabis, criticising the political inertia in addressing this need.

In 2018 Coppinger praised the MeToo movement for exposing patterns of abuse and systemic inequality. However, she also noted the limitations of achieving justice through traditional channels and called for a stronger focus on combating intimate partner violence and societal tolerance of such abuse.

In 2013 during referendum to abolish the Irish senate, Coppinger campaigned for a yes vote, calling the institution elitist and undemocratic. However, in 2020 following the loss of her Dáil seat, she ran (unsuccessfully) for a seat in the Senate. Challenged by the Irish Examiner on this, Coppinger stated that so long as the Senate continues to exist, it should be used to further progressive causes.

In 2025, she introduced a bill to ban fox hunting.

== Personal life ==
Coppinger lives in Mulhuddart. She is a secondary school teacher. Her eldest brother Eugene Coppinger served on Fingal County Council from 2011 to 2019.

Dáil	Election	Deputy (Party)	Deputy (Party)	Deputy (Party)	Deputy (Party)	Deputy (Party)
22nd	1981	Jim Mitchell (FG)	Brian Lenihan Snr (FF)	Richard Burke (FG)	Eileen Lemass (FF)	Brian Fleming (FG)
23rd	1982 (Feb)	Jim Mitchell (FG)	Brian Lenihan Snr (FF)	Richard Burke (FG)	Liam Lawlor (FF)	Brian Fleming (FG)
23rd	1982 by-election	Jim Mitchell (FG)	Brian Lenihan Snr (FF)	Liam Skelly (FG)	Liam Lawlor (FF)	Brian Fleming (FG)
24th	1982 (Nov)	Jim Mitchell (FG)	Brian Lenihan Snr (FF)	Liam Skelly (FG)	Eileen Lemass (FF)	Tomás Mac Giolla (WP)
25th	1987	Jim Mitchell (FG)	Brian Lenihan Snr (FF)	Pat O'Malley (PDs)	Liam Lawlor (FF)	Tomás Mac Giolla (WP)
26th	1989	Jim Mitchell (FG)	Brian Lenihan Snr (FF)	Austin Currie (FG)	Liam Lawlor (FF)	Tomás Mac Giolla (WP)
27th	1992	Joan Burton (Lab)	Brian Lenihan Snr (FF)	Austin Currie (FG)	Liam Lawlor (FF)	4 seats 1992–2002
27th	1996 by-election	Joan Burton (Lab)	Brian Lenihan Jnr (FF)	Austin Currie (FG)	Liam Lawlor (FF)	4 seats 1992–2002
28th	1997	Joe Higgins (SP)	Brian Lenihan Jnr (FF)	Austin Currie (FG)	Liam Lawlor (FF)	4 seats 1992–2002
29th	2002	Joe Higgins (SP)	Brian Lenihan Jnr (FF)	Joan Burton (Lab)	3 seats 2002–2011	
30th	2007	Leo Varadkar (FG)	Brian Lenihan Jnr (FF)	Joan Burton (Lab)	3 seats 2002–2011	
31st	2011	Leo Varadkar (FG)	Brian Lenihan Jnr (FF)	Joan Burton (Lab)	Joe Higgins (SP)	4 seats 2011–2024
31st	2011 by-election	Leo Varadkar (FG)	Patrick Nulty (Lab)	Joan Burton (Lab)	Joe Higgins (SP)	4 seats 2011–2024
31st	2014 by-election	Leo Varadkar (FG)	Ruth Coppinger (SP)	Joan Burton (Lab)	Joe Higgins (SP)	4 seats 2011–2024
32nd	2016	Leo Varadkar (FG)	Ruth Coppinger (AAA–PBP)	Joan Burton (Lab)	Jack Chambers (FF)	4 seats 2011–2024
33rd	2020	Leo Varadkar (FG)	Paul Donnelly (SF)	Roderic O'Gorman (GP)	Jack Chambers (FF)	4 seats 2011–2024
34th	2024	Emer Currie (FG)	Paul Donnelly (SF)	Roderic O'Gorman (GP)	Jack Chambers (FF)	Ruth Coppinger (PBP–S)
