= RISE (Ireland) =

- Leader: Paul Murphy
- Founded: 30 September 2019 (as a party); February 2021 (as an organisation)
- Split from: Socialist Party
- Ideology: Democratic socialism Eco-socialism; Trotskyism; Internationalism
- Political position: Left-wing
- National affiliation: People Before Profit; People Before Profit–Solidarity
- International affiliation: Fourth International (permanent observer)

Website
- letusrise.ie

RISE is a democratic socialist political organisation in Ireland, founded in September 2019 by former members of the Socialist Party, including Paul Murphy TD. While it was established as a separate political group, it was never officially registered as a political party. Instead, in February 2021 it entered People Before Profit party as an internal network. The name is a contrived acronym standing for Revolutionary, Internationalist, Socialist and Environmentalist. It supports a Socialist Green New Deal to reach net zero carbon emissions by 2030, the nationalisation and democratic control of the banking system and the abolition of capitalist private property.

The organisation runs a weekly podcast called Rupture Radio, and also launched an eco-socialist quarterly publication, Rupture, in July 2020.

== Election results ==
After RISE's foundation, it was not a registered political party and instead formed part of the Solidarity–People Before Profit alliance for electoral purposes. RISE contested an election for the first time at the 2020 general election, in which it ran as part of the Solidarity–People Before Profit alliance. Paul Murphy, one of the network's founders and a TD for Dublin South-West, was RISE's only candidate in this election and was re-elected. At the 2024 general election, Murphy was re-elected as a People Before Profit–Solidarity TD.

=== General elections ===
Election	Dáil	First Preference Vote	Vote %	Seats	Government
2020	33rd	4,477	0.2%	1 / 160	Fianna Fáil–Fine Gael–Green

=== European Parliament ===
Election	Leader	1st pref Votes	%	Seats	+/−	EP Group
2024 (Note: Run as part of the People Before Profit–Solidarity coalition.)	N/A	31,802	1.82 (#11)	0 / 14	New	−
