= GAMA Industry =

GAMA Industry, established in 1970, is the construction arm of the Turkish company Gama Group, founded in 1959. Gama Industry specializes in the turnkey construction of industrial facilities, including thermal power plants, refineries, petrochemical plants, hydroelectric power plants, water and wastewater treatment systems, cement factories and pipelines, installation of mechanical/electrical equipment and instrumentation and the construction of high-rise buildings, business and shopping complexes, residences, tourism facilities, social and cultural facilities, health facilities, dams, underground transportation systems and utilities.

Logo

== History ==
In the early 1970s, Gama extended its operations beyond Turkey, completing projects in Iran, Iraq, Jordan, the United Arab Emirates, Saudi Arabia, Malaysia, Russia, Turkmenistan, Uzbekistan, Azerbaijan and Libya.

Gama Industry's steel construction and boiler manufacturing plants produce heavy steel construction elements, industrial steam boilers, pressure vessels and specialised equipment for industrial facilities.

The paid-in capital of Gama Industrial Plants Manufacturing and Erection, Inc. is YTL 54,000,000.

=== Pay scandal in Ireland ===
GAMA came to public prominence in Ireland when their subsidiary GAMA Construction Ireland was revealed to be paying Turkish workers in the Republic of Ireland €2.20 per hour and working illegal overtime. GAMA were given money for the full wages of workers as part of State contracts (€12.96 an hour), but paid only €2.20 (17%) to their workers, leaving the remainder in Dutch bank accounts which GAMA had access to. GAMA were exposed by Socialist Party elected representatives Mick Murphy and Joe Higgins in the spring of 2005. After a successful strike by its workers, there was a settlement, under which GAMA paid workers all their regular pay at full rates and came to a negotiated settlement on the overtime.

The strike was the subject of a 2006 documentary produced by Frameworks Films.

=== Disi Water Conveyance Project ===
GAMA is currently engaged in a project to build a system to pump 100 million cubic meters of water per year 325 kilometers from 55 wells in the Disi Aquifer to Amman, Jordan. Because GAMA significantly contributed to the project funding, the firm will have ownership of the project for the first 25 years after completion, after which ownership will transfer to the Jordanian government.
