= Working Class Action =

Working Class Action (WCA)
- Type: Campaign group
- Headquarters: Dublin, Ireland
- Spokespeople: Joe Mooney, Cieran Perry

Working Class Action (WCA) was a left-wing campaign group based in Dublin, largely in the North Inner City and Cabra. The group campaigned on a number of issues such as against service charges (Anti-Bin Tax Campaign), against the Nice Treaty, against drugs and crime in inner city areas of Dublin and in industrial disputes such as on the closure of the Irish Glass bottle company.

== Elections ==
As part of the Anti-bin charges campaigns two WCA members Cieran Perry (Cabra) and Joe Mooney (North Inner City) stood unsuccessfully for election. Perry was less than 100 votes from being elected. Perry successfully ran as an independent in Cabra in the 2009 local elections. He also backed the election of Maureen O'Sullivan in the Dublin Central by-election. Perry was elected to the Dublin City Council. The WCA seems to be inactive for some time.
