= Fís Nua =

Irish political party

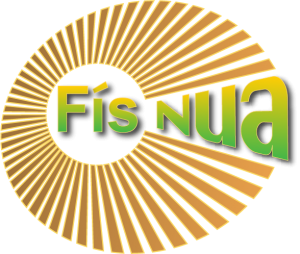
- Leader: None
- Founded: 25 June 2010
- Ideology: Green politics
- Political position: Left-wing

Website
- fisnua.com

Fís Nua (pronounced [ˌfʲiːʃ ˈn̪ˠuə]; English: "New Vision") is a minor environmentalist political party in Ireland.

== History ==
The party was formed in June 2010, mainly by former members of the Green Party who were unhappy with their participation in the then coalition government with Fianna Fáil. Fís Nua intended to campaign on the issues of political transparency, environmental issues and social justice, and hoped to draw support from existing supporters of both the Greens and the Labour Party. "Fís Nua" means "New Vision" in Irish.

The party was registered on 4 February 2011, and on the following day it was announced that they would run six candidates in the 2011 general election. Subsequently, that same month the party clashed with a rival group which had also adopted the name "New Vision". This group was formed by a son of former Fianna Fáil Minister Neil Blaney as an umbrella group for independent politicians based on four pillars: separation of bank debt and sovereign debt; overhaul of the public service; a strategy to create jobs; and what they call "the restructure" of the state's energy resources. Neither group changed their name but the latter appeared to have disappeared from public life shortly after its founding.

The party previously had one town councillor in Wicklow, Pat Kavanagh, who was elected as a member of the Green Party, but quit that party and ran in the 2011 election as a Fís Nua candidate. She then became an Independent politician.

In 2016, one of the party's two candidates in that year's general election, Niamh Ó Brien, was convicted and sentenced to four months imprisonment on charges of dangerous driving and failure to provide an intoxicant sample, after refusing to produce documentation after being stopped by Garda patrol which led to the injury of one officer who believed her to be under the influence of cannabis.

In November 2017, the Standards in Public Office Commission stated that no statements of accounts had been received from the Fís Nua, in breach of the Electoral Act.

Fís Nua has not contested any elections since 2016, though as of July 2024, it remains a registered political party. Its official Facebook account has, as of 2026, not made any posts since 2019. Some of the final posts by the account included posts encouraging users to support far-right conspiracy theorist Gemma O'Doherty, a post informing users that the party did not have the funds required to contest the 2019 European Parliament election in Ireland and instead encouraged them to spoil their votes, and finally another post discussed the possibility of the party merging with the right-wing populist group Direct Democracy Ireland.

== Electoral history ==
=== 2011 ===
==== General election ====
The party ran five candidates in the 2011 general election: one each in Dublin Central, Dublin South-East and Waterford and two in Wicklow. At the press launch on 5 February the party announced that it would also contest Cork South-West but their candidate failed to be nominated by the deadline of 9 February.

Although registered on 4 February 2011, the party's name did not appear on the ballot, as the Register of Political Parties in use was that in force on 1 February when the writ for the general election was issued.

Constituency	Candidate	1st Pref. votes	% 1st Pref. votes	Notes
Dublin Central	Liam Johnston	48	0.1%	Eliminated after first count
Dublin South-East	Peadar Ó Ceallaigh	18	0.1%	Eliminated after first count
Waterford	Ben Nutty	257	0.5%	Eliminated after third count
Wicklow	Pat Kavanagh	291	0.4%	Eliminated after eighth count
Wicklow	Gerry Kinsella	324	0.5%	Eliminated after ninth count

All candidates polled less than 5% of the vote. Peadar Ó Ceallaigh, the candidate in Dublin South-East, polled the lowest first preference vote of all the candidates in the election, and the second-lowest on record.

==== Dublin West by-election ====
The party contested the Dublin West by-election held in October 2011. This was the first election at which the party's name appeared on the ballot paper. The party's candidate, Peadar Ó Ceallaigh, came last of the 13 candidates, securing 40 votes or 0.1% of the total first preferences.

=== 2014 ===
The party had candidates in each of the three constituencies for European Parliament elections, the Dublin West by-election for a seat in Dáil Éireann and also a number of candidates for local elections: all elections were held on Friday 23 May 2014.

==== Dublin West by-election ====
The party's candidate was Daniel Boyne. He received 113 first preference votes, this being 0.4% of the votes cast; he was last of the ten candidates and was eliminated after the first count.

==== European Parliament ====
Constituency	Candidate	1st Pref. votes	% 1st Pref. votes	Notes
Dublin	Damon Matthew Wise	1,147	0.3%	Last of 12 candidates, eliminated after first count.
Midlands–North-West	Cordelia Níc Fhearraigh	1,829	0.3%	Last of 14 candidates, eliminated after first count.
South	Dómhnall Ó Ríordáin	1,634	0.2%	Last of 15 candidates, eliminated after second count.

==== Local elections ====
Council	Local Electoral Area	Candidate	1st Pref. votes	% 1st Pref. votes	Notes
Clare County Council	Ennis	Damon Matthew Wise	7		Last of 27 candidates. Eliminated
Clare County Council	Ennis	Vera Moloney	30		25th of 27 candidates. Eliminated
Clare County Council	Killaloe	Niamh O'Brien	731		8th of 10 candidates. Eliminated
Clare County Council	Shannon	Karen Wise	18		Last of 16 candidates. Eliminated
Galway County Council	Athenry-Oranmore	Suzanne O'Keeffe	53		Last of 16 candidates. Eliminated.
Sligo County Council	Sligo	James Higgins	38		Last of 23 candidates Eliminated on third count.

=== 2016 general election ===
The party ran two candidates in the general election held on 26 February 2016. They were Niamh Ó Brien in Clare and Cordelia Nic Fhearraigh in Donegal. O'Brien came thirteenth of sixteen candidates, receiving 1,154 first preference votes, and was eliminated on the second count. Nic Fhearraigh came last of the sixteen candidates in Donegal, receiving 70 first preference votes, and was eliminated on the first count. Nic Fhearraigh, who made all her election communications exclusively through the Irish language, was one of the lowest-polling candidates in the country.
