= Assault of Natasha O'Brien =

Irish woman assaulted in 2022

- Date: 29 May 2022
- Location: O'Connell Street, Limerick, Ireland
- Perpetrator: Cathal Crotty
- Injuries: severe concussion, a broken nose, severe swelling, and bruising on both arms, shoulders, head, right upper thigh, left eye, cheek and jaw.

On 29 May 2022, 24-year-old Irish woman Natasha O'Brien was attacked by active-duty Irish soldier Cathal Crotty on O'Connell Street in Limerick, Ireland. Crotty was given a suspended sentence for violently assaulting O'Brien on the street after she urged him to cease shouting homophobic slurs at a bystander, as reported in court.

The 22-year-old soldier who assaulted O'Brien later bragged to friends on Snapchat, stating, "Two to put her down, two to put her out," referring to the four strikes he delivered. In the following weeks, O'Brien and her friend diligently searched social media platforms to uncover the identity of the man who had assaulted her. Their efforts led them to Crotty, and this information was subsequently relayed to An Garda Síochána.

Crotty pleaded guilty before Judge Tom O'Donnell at the Limerick Circuit Criminal Court. Initially, Crotty claimed to the Gardaí that O'Brien had provoked the attack; however, he changed his plea after being presented with CCTV evidence of the incident. The comprehensive footage captured the unprovoked assault that occurred when O'Brien confronted Crotty for his use of homophobic slurs.

During the trial, demonstrations in support of O'Brien took place in Limerick, Cork, Dublin, and Galway. Irish Justice Minister Helen McEntee commended O'Brien for her courage in stepping forward.

== Assault ==
O'Brien, unfamiliar to Crotty, was returning home with a female companion after completing her shift at a pub when he launched a brutal attack on her. Crotty seized O'Brien by her hair and forcefully struck her to the ground. He continued to grip her hair with one hand while repeatedly hitting her face with the other until she lost consciousness, as reported in court.

O'Brien suffered a broken nose, extensive bruising, and experienced nightmares and panic attacks in the aftermath. She expressed that she feared for her life during the assault. Crotty fled the scene when a male bystander intervened, although his friends remained present. Crotty reportedly reacted aggressively towards O'Brien after she and a friend had courteously requested that he cease shouting derogatory slurs at others on the street, as presented in court.

Crotty, who consumed alcohol during the evening, has yet to provide a comprehensive account of the incident in which he struck O'Brien with as many as six punches.

=== Victim-impact statement and judgement ===
Judge Tom O'Donnell acknowledged O'Brien's victim impact statement and the severity of the attack but emphasized that Crotty "must be given credit" for his guilty plea. "In fairness to him, he has come to court and publicly admitted his wrongdoing, and he has made a public acknowledgment of his criminality," the judge remarked. He also noted the importance of considering Crotty's military career, indicating that incarceration would jeopardize his position. Consequently, the judge imposed a three-year fully suspended sentence and mandated that Crotty pay €3,000 in compensation to the victim.

== Public reactions ==
In July 2024, the Defence Forces stated, "The Defence Forces commend the bravery of the victim in this case and wish her a complete recovery from the injuries she has suffered." "The Defence Forces firmly denounce any conduct by active personnel that contradicts or fails to embody our core values. "Any conviction in a civilian court may affect the retention and service of Defence Forces members, as outlined in Defence Forces Regulations. "Following the completion of due process in a civilian court, the matter will be addressed by the appropriate Defence Forces authorities in line with Defence Forces Regulations. Therefore, it would be inappropriate to provide further comments at this time."

The Defence Forces declined to elaborate when asked about the initiation of any internal disciplinary actions within the army.

Taoiseach Simon Harris expressed his dissatisfaction with the response of the Irish Defence Forces regarding the aftermath of an incident involving an Irish soldier who brutally attacked a woman. He indicated his desire to meet with O'Brien once any additional legal matters have been resolved and praised her courage in coming forward.

Justice Minister Helen McEntee has expressed her willingness to collaborate with O'Brien to implement changes aimed at enhancing the safety of women in Irish society. During her address at a conference on human trafficking and modern slavery in Cork, McEntee conveyed her frustration, echoing the sentiments of the Limerick assault victim, regarding the ongoing violence, abuse, and coercive control that women continue to face in Ireland.

On 25 June 2024, Members of the Dáil stood to applaud O'Brien. O'Brien was present in the public gallery because her case, along with the broader topics of gender-based violence and the Defence Forces' handling of personnel convicted of crimes, took center stage during Leaders' Questions.

=== Protests ===
On 22 June 2024, O’Brien joined around 1,000 people in her hometown of Limerick to call for an end to gender-based violence, urging society to denounce all such violence as she stood with protesters on Bedford Row. In Galway, about 500 people gathered in Eyre Square chanting “Natasha, we have your back” and “Judge O’Donnell, shame on you". At a protest outside the Cork courthouse on 28 June 2024, O'Brien addressed calls for reform of the gender-based violence court system and increased funding for support organisations, backed by activists from the socialist feminist organisation ROSA.

A solidarity gathering took place in Dundalk’s Market Square beside the courthouse, where speakers addressed the crowd and participants wore purple and brought candles and banners. In Dungarvan, Monica Murphy and Cllr Conor D. McGuinness organised a march at Walton Park, calling for mobilisation and workplace walkouts to end violence against women. A similar show of support was held in Monaghan Town.

O'Brien felt uplifted by the announcement that the DPP plans to challenge the suspended three-year sentence given to her attacker, arguing that the punishment was excessively lenient. O'Brien indicated that she had been informed the appeal before the three-judge Court of Appeal would not take place until October or November 2024. She also mentioned that she had received an invitation to attend the appeal hearing, and that a transcript from Cathal Crotty's sentencing hearing would be provided to the court.

== Dismissed from Defence Forces ==
Crotty was dismissed from the Defence Forces due to a criminal conviction. The dismissal process was overseen by Brigadier General Brian Cleary, the officer in command of One Brigade, with assistance from several military legal officers. It has been clarified that this procedure did not include a court martial; rather, Brigadier General Cleary exercised his authority to implement a summary dismissal in accordance with Defence Forces Regulations.

== Aspiration towards a career in politics ==
O'Brien has expressed a potential interest in pursuing a political career. She may explore this avenue in the coming years, as she shows her support for Elisa O'Donovan during the Limerick city constituency count at Limerick Racecourse.

== Awards ==
O'Brien has been recognised as the Goss.ie Woman of the Year for 2024. During her acceptance speech, she expressed, "This award does not feel like it belongs to me; I see it as a representation of many women. I consider myself a conduit, a voice for all women. "My aim is to advocate for what needs to be addressed, to challenge limits, and to strive for progress and transformation, as we all deserve that."

At the Hayu InstaStar Awards 2024, O'Brien was honored with the Inspiration Award in recognition of her outstanding efforts to promote awareness of gender-based violence in Ireland. In an interview with VIP Magazine during the event, she expressed that taking on the role of a spokesperson for such a significant movement is quite "nerve-wracking."
