= Campaign Against Home and Water Taxes =

The Campaign Against Home and Water Taxes (CAHWT) was a group opposed to the introduction of property and water charges in Ireland. It called for the boycott to be used to this effect.

The campaign launched on 22 December 2011. It had a national presence, and was supported by numerous national representatives, including Joe Higgins, Clare Daly, Joan Collins, Séamus Healy, Richard Boyd Barrett and Thomas Pringle. It also had support from some Sinn Féin members and the Socialist Party. It was not supported by Fianna Fáil. Fine Gael Environment Minister Phil Hogan, who announced the initial plans for a household charge and payment for water use, openly criticised the subversive campaign.

It established a "national anti-household tax" phone line and organised meetings in every major town in the country. The Irish Times said in April 2012 that the campaign had been "built with lightning speed."

On 1 May 2013, Gardaí arrested five members of the group, including Ted Tynan and Mick Barry, during a midday protest inside the Patrick Street branch of the Bank of Ireland in Cork city. Tynan said he felt a need to stand up against austerity.

On 6 May 2013, the Revenue Commissioners reported that 1.2 m households (74%) have paid the property tax. In August 2013, the Revenue said 1.58 m households had paid the tax, and over €175 m has been collected.

Facebook groups arranged meetings to vandalise or remove water meters, with one Mullingar group removing over 60.

A 20-metre exclusion zone was granted to ensure the safety of workers being harassed by groups who objected to consumers being charged for their water use. In one incident, protesters prevented meter installation engineers from working at or leaving a site for 14 hours.

In late 2014, the Dáil heard how workers were attacked with hammers and glass, punched, kicked and bitten. Protest organisers encouraged supporters to find their addresses on social media and follow them home. Some engineers were held in a van for over twelve hours without access to food, water or toilet facilities.

The plan was ultimately scrapped in 2016.
