= Patrick Nulty =

Irish politician (born 1982)

Teachta Dála
- In office October 2011 – 24 March 2014
- Constituency: Dublin West

Personal details
- Born: 18 November 1982 (age 43) Dublin, Ireland
- Party: Independent; Labour Party (–2013)
- Education: Trinity College Dublin; University College Dublin

Patrick Nulty (born 18 November 1982) is a teacher, university lecturer and former Irish Labour Party politician. He was elected as a Teachta Dála (TD) for Dublin West at a by-election in October 2011. He sat as an independent TD after losing the Labour Party whip on 6 December 2011. He resigned as a TD on 24 March 2014 after sending several sexually inappropriate messages to domestic abuse victims in his constituency and a 17-year-old girl.

== Biography ==
Nulty was born and raised in Corduff near Dublin. When two weeks old, he was injured in a house fire, leaving him with burn scars on his face and arms. He attended Riversdale Community College and has a degree in social policy from Trinity College Dublin and a Masters in Social Science from University College Dublin. He worked as a social policy advisor for a homeless charity for five years. He is also a former National Chairperson of Labour Youth and was a prominent activist of the Students' Union in Trinity.

== Political career ==
=== Labour Youth ===
A leading member of Labour Youth's re-foundation in the early 2000s, Nulty served in Labour Youth as the National Chairman, Communications Officer and Gender Equality Officer. Nulty led a campaign while in Trinity Labour Youth against the sexual harassment of female students on campus. Throughout Nulty's career in the Labour Party, he had been a vocal supporter of Labour Youth and was regular speakers at the annual Labour Youth Tom Johnson Summer School.

=== County Council ===
Nulty was elected to Fingal County Council for Labour at the 2009 local elections in the Mulhuddart local electoral area.

=== Dáil ===
He was Labour's unsuccessful second candidate for Dublin West at the 2011 general election, where running-mate Joan Burton topped the poll, but was elected as a Teachta Dála (TD) for Dublin West at a by-election in October 2011. It was the first time since the 1982 Galway East by-election that a government party candidate had won a by-election.

He was on the Labour Party's left wing, and opposed both the Lisbon Treaty and Labour's coalition deal with Fine Gael after the election. He also rejected the idea of a transfer pact with the Fine Gael candidate despite the parties' coalition. While in opposition he called on his former colleagues to legislate for the X case as had been promised by Labour for many years. Nulty voted against the VAT increase in the 2012 budget and lost the Labour Party whip as a result.

He was described as a "Labour rebel candidate" by the Irish Independent, while The Irish Times quoted the label "anti-government Government candidate" discussing his opposition to cuts in services at Blanchardstown Hospital.

On 21 June 2013, he resigned from the Labour Party.

=== Resignation as TD ===
He resigned from the Dáil on 24 March 2014 as a result of having sent inappropriate Facebook messages to a 17-year-old female, and to two other adult women. At first he denied that he was the sender of the messages, and claimed that his phone had been hacked, but subsequently admitted his behaviour when confronted with evidence that the messages had been sent from Leinster House. Nulty apologised for his behaviour and said the "message was sent while under the influence of alcohol". In September 2015 he was awarded a teaching scholarship by the University of Limerick to undertake a PhD in Politics and Public Administration.

| Dáil | Election | Deputy (Party) | Deputy (Party) | Deputy (Party) | Deputy (Party) | Deputy (Party) |
|---|---|---|---|---|---|---|
| 22nd | 1981 | Jim Mitchell (FG) | Brian Lenihan Snr (FF) | Richard Burke (FG) | Eileen Lemass (FF) | Brian Fleming (FG) |
| 23rd | 1982 (Feb) | Jim Mitchell (FG) | Brian Lenihan Snr (FF) | Richard Burke (FG) | Liam Lawlor (FF) | Brian Fleming (FG) |
| 23rd | 1982 by-election | Jim Mitchell (FG) | Brian Lenihan Snr (FF) | Liam Skelly (FG) | Liam Lawlor (FF) | Brian Fleming (FG) |
| 24th | 1982 (Nov) | Jim Mitchell (FG) | Brian Lenihan Snr (FF) | Liam Skelly (FG) | Eileen Lemass (FF) | Tomás Mac Giolla (WP) |
| 25th | 1987 | Jim Mitchell (FG) | Brian Lenihan Snr (FF) | Pat O'Malley (PDs) | Liam Lawlor (FF) | Tomás Mac Giolla (WP) |
| 26th | 1989 | Jim Mitchell (FG) | Brian Lenihan Snr (FF) | Austin Currie (FG) | Liam Lawlor (FF) | Tomás Mac Giolla (WP) |
| 27th | 1992 | Joan Burton (Lab) | Brian Lenihan Snr (FF) | Austin Currie (FG) | Liam Lawlor (FF) | 4 seats 1992–2002 |
| 27th | 1996 by-election | Joan Burton (Lab) | Brian Lenihan Jnr (FF) | Austin Currie (FG) | Liam Lawlor (FF) | 4 seats 1992–2002 |
| 28th | 1997 | Joe Higgins (SP) | Brian Lenihan Jnr (FF) | Austin Currie (FG) | Liam Lawlor (FF) | 4 seats 1992–2002 |
| 29th | 2002 | Joe Higgins (SP) | Brian Lenihan Jnr (FF) | Joan Burton (Lab) | 3 seats 2002–2011 | |
| 30th | 2007 | Leo Varadkar (FG) | Brian Lenihan Jnr (FF) | Joan Burton (Lab) | 3 seats 2002–2011 | |
| 31st | 2011 | Leo Varadkar (FG) | Brian Lenihan Jnr (FF) | Joan Burton (Lab) | Joe Higgins (SP) | 4 seats 2011–2024 |
| 31st | 2011 by-election | Leo Varadkar (FG) | Patrick Nulty (Lab) | Joan Burton (Lab) | Joe Higgins (SP) | 4 seats 2011–2024 |
| 31st | 2014 by-election | Leo Varadkar (FG) | Ruth Coppinger (SP) | Joan Burton (Lab) | Joe Higgins (SP) | 4 seats 2011–2024 |
| 32nd | 2016 | Leo Varadkar (FG) | Ruth Coppinger (AAA–PBP) | Joan Burton (Lab) | Jack Chambers (FF) | 4 seats 2011–2024 |
| 33rd | 2020 | Leo Varadkar (FG) | Paul Donnelly (SF) | Roderic O'Gorman (GP) | Jack Chambers (FF) | 4 seats 2011–2024 |
| 34th | 2024 | Emer Currie (FG) | Paul Donnelly (SF) | Roderic O'Gorman (GP) | Jack Chambers (FF) | Ruth Coppinger (PBP–S) |
