= Green payments =

In agricultural and environmental policy, green payments refer to payments made to producers as compensation for environmental benefits that accrue as a result of or in conjunction with their farming activities. The environmental benefits can include protecting wetland as improving filtration or maintaining soil quality to provide a carbon sink.

The Conservation Security Program that was authorized in the 2002 Farm Bill (P.L. 107–171, Sec. 2001- 2006) was generally viewed as the first green payments program in the United States by paying producers to provide conservation benefits on land from which food and fiber were being produced.
