= Solidarity (Ireland) =

Solidarity Irish: Dlúthpháirtíocht – na sóisialaigh
- Leader: Collective leadership
- Founded: 1996; 30 years ago (as the Socialist Party); 2014; 12 years ago (as the Anti-Austerity Alliance); March 2026; 7 months ago (merger into a single organisation)
- Preceded by: Militant Labour; Anti-Austerity Alliance; Socialist Party
- Headquarters: 141 Thomas Street, Dublin 8, Ireland
- Newspaper: The Socialist
- Youth wing: Socialist Youth
- Ideology: Democratic socialism Trotskyism; Euroscepticism
- Political position: Left-wing to far-left
- National affiliation: People Before Profit–Solidarity; CCLA (2016 to 2019)
- European affiliation: European Anti-Capitalist Left
- European Parliament group: GUE/NGL
- International affiliation: Committee for a Workers' International (until 2019); International Socialist Alternative (2019 to 2024); ROSA
- Colours: Red, white
- Dáil Éireann: 1 / 174
- Local government in the Republic of Ireland: 4 / 949

Website
- solidarity.ie

Solidarity (Irish: Dlúthpháirtíocht – na sóisialaigh), also styled Solidarity – the Socialist Alternative, is a Trotskyist political party in Ireland, active in both the Republic of Ireland and Northern Ireland. The party in its current form was established in March 2026, when the Socialist Party (founded in 1996) formally merged with Solidarity, its long-standing electoral vehicle, which had been launched in 2014 as the Anti-Austerity Alliance (AAA) and renamed Solidarity in 2017.

From 2014 until the merger, every elected representative standing under the Solidarity banner had in fact been a member of the Socialist Party, leading commentators to describe Solidarity as a front organisation for its Trotskyist parent. The March 2026 merger, endorsed at Solidarity's National Conference, formalised this relationship into a single organisation "covering the whole of the island of Ireland, North and South", organised into two regional structures. Solidarity is part of the People Before Profit–Solidarity electoral alliance in the Republic, and in Northern Ireland contested elections as Cross-Community Labour Alternative until a split in the party in 2019.

== History ==
=== Origins: the Militant Tendency (1969 to 1989) ===
The Irish Militant Tendency began in 1969, when Paul Jones, an Irish student who had joined Militant in Britain while studying in London, returned to Derry and began organising there, as well as holding meetings in Dublin. Peter Hadden had similarly joined Militant while attending Sussex University in England, and on returning to Northern Ireland in 1971 began organising Militant there. The group grew on both sides of the border and practised entryism within both the Northern Ireland Labour Party and the Labour Party in the Republic. In 1977 the group was expelled from the NILP and formed the Labour and Trade Union Group to contest elections in the north. In the south, the tendency had been formally founded in 1972 within the Irish Labour Party, grouped around the newsletter Militant Irish Monthly. It organised within the Labour Party throughout the 1970s and 1980s and briefly controlled Labour Youth between 1983 and 1986. People associated with it include Dermot Connolly, Clare Daly, Finn Geaney, Joe Higgins and John Throne.

=== Militant Labour and the founding of the Socialist Party (1989 to 1997) ===
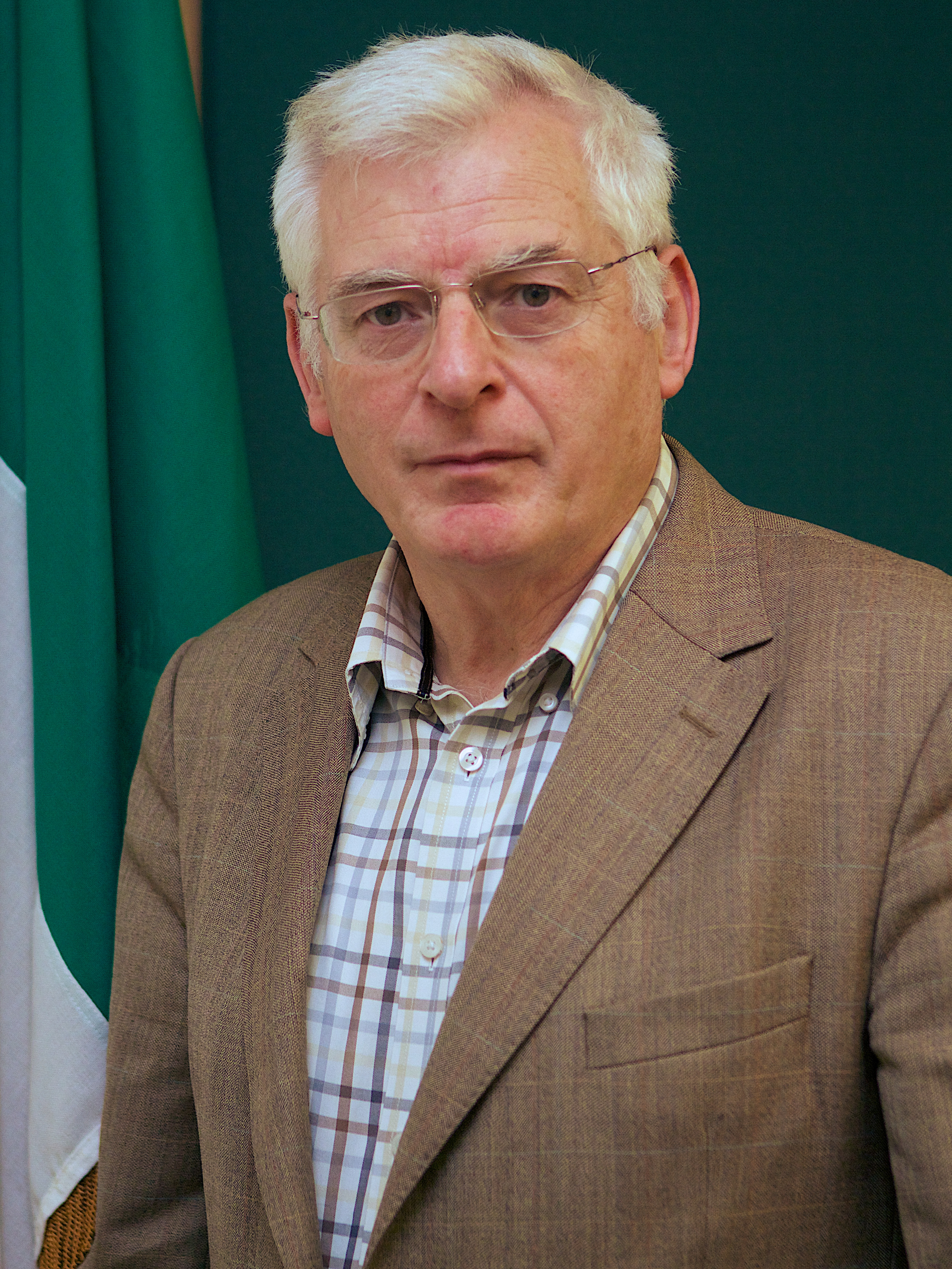
In 1997, Joe Higgins secured the party's first seat in the Dáil

In the late 1980s, several known members were expelled from the Labour Party, having been accused of Trotskyist entryism. In 1989 they established an independent party under the name Militant Labour, a title also used by other sections of the Committee for a Workers' International at the time. In 1996 Militant Labour merged fully with the Labour and Trade Union Group of Northern Ireland and changed its name to the Socialist Party, building some electoral support in the Republic of Ireland while finding it harder to gain an electoral foothold in the north, where it nonetheless maintained a minor presence in the trade union movement and a youth wing.

Joe Higgins came within 252 votes of winning the 1996 Dublin West by-election, before winning the seat outright at the 1997 general election.

=== 2002 to 2007 ===
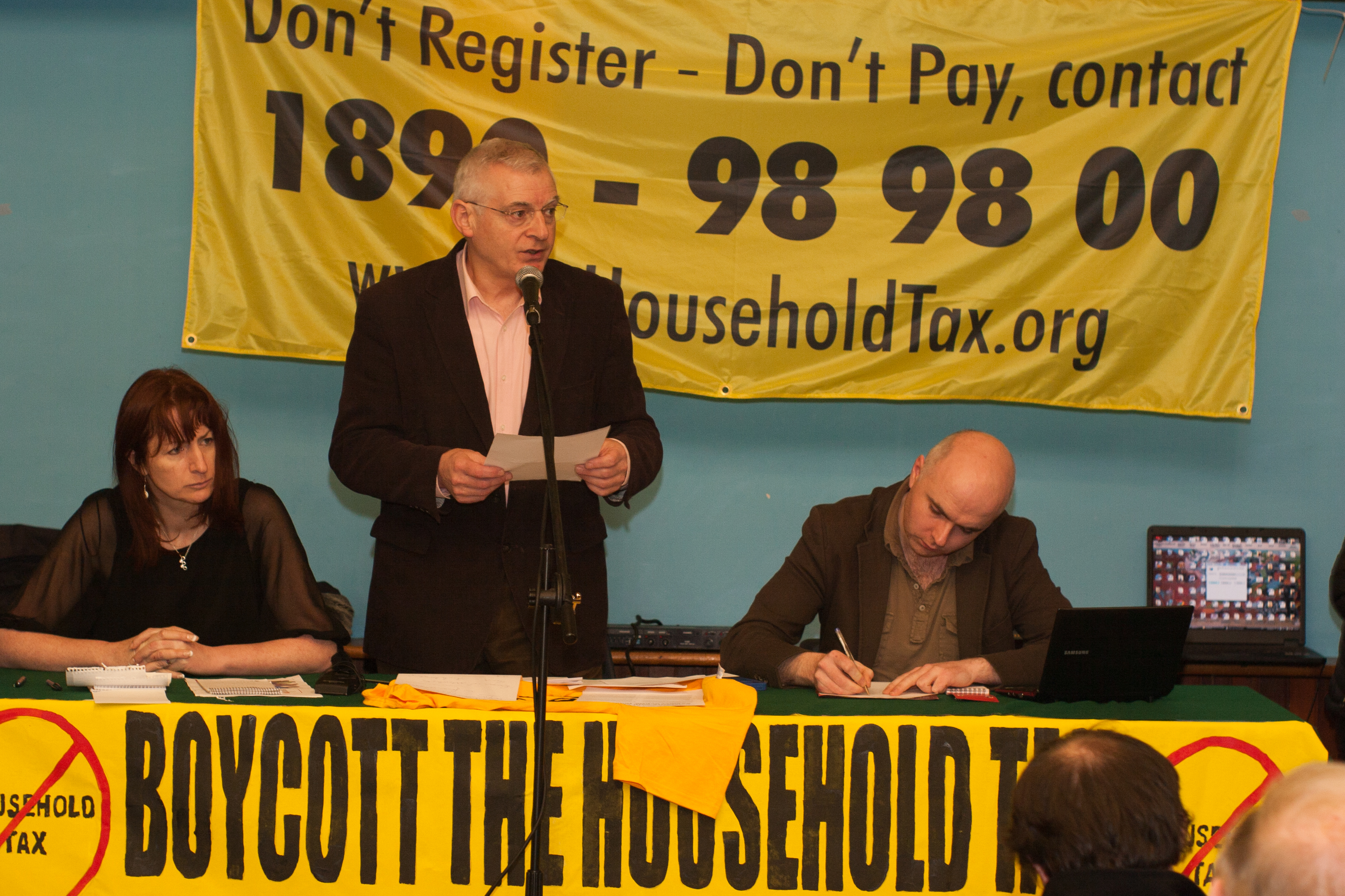
Socialist Party TDs Clare Daly (left) and Joe Higgins (centre) during the Boycott the Household Tax campaign in January 2012; both were jailed for their part in the Anti-Bin Tax Campaign.

At the 2002 general election Higgins retained his Dublin West seat, while Clare Daly narrowly missed out on a second seat in Dublin North. The Anti-Bin Tax Campaign arose during this period. On 19 September 2003, Higgins and Daly were sent to Mountjoy Prison for a month after refusing to abide by a High Court injunction relating to the blockading of bin lorries.

At the 2004 local elections the party gained two council seats, with Mick Murphy elected to South Dublin County Council and Mick Barry elected to Cork City Council. The party also retained its two seats, held by Daly and Ruth Coppinger, on Fingal County Council. At the European election held the same day, Higgins received 23,218 (5.5 per cent) first-preference votes in Dublin but did not win a seat.

Councillor Mick Murphy brought the GAMA construction scandal to light in October 2004, after discovering Turkish migrant construction workers living on the building site where they were illegally underpaid and forced to work hours in breach of the EU Working Time Directive. Murphy brought the matter to Higgins, who raised it in the Dáil on 8 February 2005, bringing public awareness to the workers' plight. The exploitation, which included pay as low as €2.20 an hour against a minimum wage of €7.00, led to a strike by immigrant workers. The exploited workers each won tens of thousands of euro in unpaid wages and overtime.

=== 2007 to 2011 ===
At the 2007 general election Higgins lost his Dublin West seat, leaving the party without a TD for the first time since 1997. The party campaigned for a "no" vote in the 2008 and 2009 referendums on the Treaty of Lisbon.

At the 2009 European and local elections, Higgins won a Dublin European Parliament seat with 50,510 (12.4 per cent) first-preference votes and also gained a seat on Fingal County Council in the Castleknock local electoral area. The party held its seats on Fingal County and Cork City Councils, held by Coppinger and Barry respectively, while gaining one seat each on Balbriggan Town Council and Drogheda Borough Council, though it lost its only seat on South Dublin County Council, held by Mick Murphy.

=== 2011 to 2014: the United Left Alliance and the founding of the Anti-Austerity Alliance ===
At the 2011 general election the party returned two TDs: Clare Daly in Dublin North and Joe Higgins, regaining his seat, in Dublin West. Both stood as part of the United Left Alliance (ULA), which also included People Before Profit and the Workers and Unemployed Action Group alongside independent activists, and which won five seats overall. Higgins resigned his European Parliament seat and was replaced by Paul Murphy. Following the death of Brian Lenihan Jnr, the party contested the 2011 Dublin West by-election, with candidate Ruth Coppinger placing third.

Clare Daly resigned from the Socialist Party in August 2012, over a dispute regarding her support for Independent TD Mick Wallace, whom the party had called on to resign following the revelation of tax irregularities, and the party withdrew from the ULA in January 2013.

The Anti-Austerity Alliance was launched in February 2014 as a registered electoral vehicle for the Socialist Party's candidates, registered to contest local elections and running at least forty candidates in the 2014 Irish local elections. The party altered its registered name that year to Stop the Water Tax to Socialist Party. Because its elected representatives were, in fact, members of the Socialist Party, the rebranding was criticised by The Journal columnist Aaron McKenna as a front organisation for the Trotskyist Socialist Party.

=== 2014 to 2016: water charges and electoral breakthrough ===
On 8 April 2014 the AAA launched a plan to create 150,000 jobs across Ireland, replacing the controversial JobBridge and Gateway initiatives with a "real jobs programme of public works, free education and genuine training schemes". At the 2014 local elections the party gained seats on Limerick and Cork City Councils, giving it "a national rather than Dublin-centric" profile. The same day, the 2014 Dublin West by-election returned Ruth Coppinger to Dáil Éireann. Paul Murphy failed to retain the party's European Parliament seat but went on to win the 2014 Dublin South-West by-election that October, a surprise victory over the favoured Sinn Féin candidate. According to the Irish Examiner, Mick Barry had by this point been "a leading figure in the Cork and national campaigns" against household and water charges.

In 2015, water charge protestors, including party elected representatives Paul Murphy, Kieran Mahon and Mick Murphy, were arrested. The arrests led to accusations of "political policing" and sparked minor solidarity protests across Europe, including in London, Berlin, Vienna and Stockholm.

On 7 August 2015 the AAA was removed from the Register of Political Parties. It held discussions that August with People Before Profit about forming a new political grouping, and on 17 September 2015 the two parties announced they had formally registered as a single political party for electoral purposes, called "Anti-Austerity Alliance–People Before Profit" (subsequently Solidarity–People Before Profit, and, from 2021, People Before Profit–Solidarity). Under this alliance, in the 2016 Irish general election Murphy and Coppinger were re-elected in Dublin South-West and Dublin West respectively, and Barry was elected in Cork North-Central. In Northern Ireland, the party instead ran as Cross-Community Labour Alternative at the 2016 Northern Ireland Assembly election, critically calling for a vote for People Before Profit where the two did not stand in the same constituencies.

=== Relaunch as Solidarity ===
The Anti-Austerity Alliance's original branding, used until the 2017 relaunch as Solidarity

On 10 March 2017, the Anti-Austerity Alliance called a press conference and announced it would relaunch as Solidarity. The name change was made to reflect the "many movements emerging on workplace, economic and social issues" and to better capture the organisation's campaigning on Repeal, LGBTQ issues and equality generally, alongside its established work on water charges and housing. Cork City Councillor Lil O'Donnell left the party at the time of the rebranding.

Rita Harrold unsuccessfully stood for Solidarity in Dublin at the 2019 European Parliament election.

=== 2016 to 2020: the RISE split ===
Logo of the Socialist Party during the 2010s

In 2019, divisions arising from a split within the Committee for a Workers' International led Paul Murphy TD to leave the Socialist Party and set up a new grouping, RISE. The same split led to the formation of Militant Left, which aligned with the reconstituted Committee for a Workers' International (Refounded), a body predominantly supported by the Socialist Party of England and Wales. RISE remained part of the People Before Profit–Solidarity grouping until it fully integrated into People Before Profit in early 2021. Cross-Community Labour Alternative aligned with Militant Left and from 2022 Northern Ireland Assembly election the Socialist Party once again stood on its own name.

=== 2020 to 2024 ===
At the 2020 Irish general election, Coppinger lost her Dublin West seat, leaving Barry as the party's only TD, amid a significant drop in the party's overall vote share. In Northern Ireland, the party returned to contesting elections directly as the Socialist Party from 2022.

In July 2024, the Socialist Party voted to disaffiliate from the International Socialist Alternative.

=== 2024 to 2026: merger into a single party ===
At the 2024 Irish general election, Ruth Coppinger was once again elected in Dublin West, while Mick Barry narrowly lost his seat in Cork North-Central to Eoghan Kenny of Labour.

In early March 2026, the Socialist Party announced it would campaign as Solidarity – the socialist alternative, with its social media presence and publications updated to reflect this. The change was formalised later that month at Solidarity's National Conference, which adopted a new party constitution declaring Solidarity "one organisation, covering the whole of the island of Ireland, North and South", organised into two regions with unified national structures, and adopted the Irish-language name Dlúthpháirtíocht – na sóisialaigh. The merger brought to an end the arrangement, in place since 2014, under which Socialist Party candidates stood for election under the separate Solidarity brand, uniting the party's internal organisation and its public electoral identity for the first time since the AAA's launch.

== Ideology and policies ==
Solidarity is ideologically a Trotskyist group.

Solidarity describes itself as "a revolutionary organisation committed to ending the rule of capitalism (the source of the exploitation, oppression, war and environmental destruction in the world today)". It stands for "the socialist alternative to the dictatorship of the markets, namely real democracy whereby ordinary people take centre stage in running society, with democratic public ownership of banks, of key sectors of the economy and industry, and a democratic plan of the economy to provide for the needs of people". It opposes so-called "Social Partnership" deals and those in the trade union movement who advocate them, considering such agreements detrimental to the wellbeing of workers.

On economic policy, the party intends to end "Ireland's status as a tax haven", introduce a financial transactions tax, abolish the property tax, double the corporation tax, increase income tax on high earners, and introduce a "Millionaire's Tax" on net personal wealth in excess of €1 million.

The party is Eurosceptic and supported Brexit, considering the EU to be a "club of bosses and bankers" and rejecting attempts at reform on the grounds that there are "almost no mechanisms of democratic accountability" within it.

Solidarity opposes sectarian division in Northern Ireland between Protestants and Catholics and seeks working-class unity across both sides of the border, arguing that capitalism is incapable of overcoming sectarianism. It takes a critical view of the Good Friday Agreement and subsequent initiatives, holding that these further entrench and institutionalise sectarian division rather than address the conflict's underlying causes. On this basis, the party opposes a referendum on Irish reunification as a "border poll", on the grounds that it would further entrench sectarianism, and has said it would campaign for a boycott of any such referendum were one held. Instead, Solidarity holds that Ireland, England, Scotland and Wales should merge to form a socialist federation, aspiring to be part of a wider Socialist Federation of Europe. The Phoenix has described this position as a "bizarre fusion of Trotskyism and British Unionism" that "articulates a unionist outlook dressed in socialist rhetoric".

Solidarity is pro-choice and is a socialist feminist organisation. Its members, together with ROSA, organised an "abortion pill bus" during the campaign to repeal the Eighth Amendment, travelling across Ireland to distribute abortion pills. Solidarity is directly affiliated with ROSA, described as an "International Socialist Feminist Movement". The party's "What we stand for" statement also calls to "end church control of schools and hospitals" and for "full separation of church and state", and separately calls to "defend the right to asylum", end Direct Provision and "abolish all racist immigration laws".

Internationally, Solidarity was affiliated to the Trotskyist International Socialist Alternative (and, before that, the Committee for a Workers' International) until disaffiliating in 2024, and is currently directly affiliated with ROSA.

== Structure and organisation ==
Following the 2026 merger, Solidarity describes itself as one organisation "covering the whole of the island of Ireland, North and South", organised into two regions to reflect differing political realities north and south of the border while national structures take precedence over regional ones. Elected representatives holding remunerated public office observe a pay cap, donating any portion of their salary above the "average industrial wage" to the party and other left-wing causes. The party maintains The Socialist as its principal newspaper, alongside a quarterly journal, Socialist Alternative, and a youth wing, Socialist Youth.

In 2015 the party received state funding of €132,000. It held a seat in the European Parliament from 2009 to 2014.

== Election results ==
=== Dáil Éireann ===
Election	FPv	%	Seats	%	±	Dáil	Government
1997	12,445	0.7 (#9)	1 / 166	0.6 (#6)	New	28th	Opposition; 25th government (FF-PD minority)
2002	14,896	0.8 (#7)	1 / 166	0.6 (#7)	Steady	29th	Opposition; 26th government (FF-PD majority)
2007	13,218	0.6 (#7)	0 / 166	—N/a	▼1	30th	No seats 27th, 28th government (FF-GP-PD/Ind majority)
2011	26,770	1.2 (#6)	2 / 166	1.2 (#5)	▲2	31st	Opposition; 29th government (FG-Lab supermajority)
2016 (Note: Contested election as Anti-Austerity Alliance–People Before Profit.)	41,994	1.9 (#9)	3 / 158	1.9 (#7)	▲1	32nd	Opposition; 30th, 31st government (FG-Ind minority)
2020 (Note: Contested election as Solidarity–People Before Profit.)	12,723	0.6 (#10)	1 / 160	0.6 (#8)	▼2	33rd	Opposition; 32nd, 33rd, 34th government (FF-FG-GP majority)
2024 (Note: Contested election as People Before Profit–Solidarity. Figures also contain RISE which was not part of People Before Profit until February 2021.)	13,137	0.6 (#11)	1 / 174	0.6 (#7)	Steady	34th	Opposition; 35th government (FF-FG-Ind majority)

=== Northern Ireland Assembly ===
Election	Assembly	First Preference Vote	Vote %	Seats
1998	1st	789	0.1%	0 / 108
2003	2nd	343	0.0%	0 / 108
2007	3rd	473	0.1%	0 / 108
2011	4th	819	0.1%	0 / 108
2022	7th	524	0.0%	0 / 90

=== Local ===
Election	Country	First Preference Vote	Vote %	Seats
1999	Republic of Ireland	5,312	0.4%	2 / 883
2004	Republic of Ireland	13,494	0.7%	4 / 883
2005	Northern Ireland	828	0.1%	0 / 582
2009	Republic of Ireland	16,052	0.9%	4 / 883
2011	Northern Ireland	682	0.1%	0 / 583
2014	Northern Ireland	272	0.0%	0 / 462
2014	Republic of Ireland	Contested the election as part of Anti-Austerity Alliance (Note: 14 Socialist Party members were elected as part of the Anti-Austerity Alliance in 2014.)		
2019	Republic of Ireland	Contested the election as part of People Before Profit–Solidarity.		
2024	Republic of Ireland	Contested the election as part of People Before Profit–Solidarity.		

=== European ===
Solidarity has contested European elections in the Republic of Ireland but not in Northern Ireland.

Election	First Preference Vote	Vote %	Seats
1999	10,619	0.8%	0 / 15
2004	23,218	1.3%	0 / 13
2009	50,510	2.7%	1 / 12
2014	29,953	1.8%	0 / 11
2019	Contested the election as part of People Before Profit–Solidarity.		
2024	Contested the election as part of People Before Profit–Solidarity.		

== See also ==
- Committee for a Workers' International
- Militant tendency
- People Before Profit–Solidarity
- ROSA (organisation)
- United Left Alliance
