= Labour Youth =

Youth wing of the Labour Party of Ireland

Labour Youth Óige an Lucht Oibre
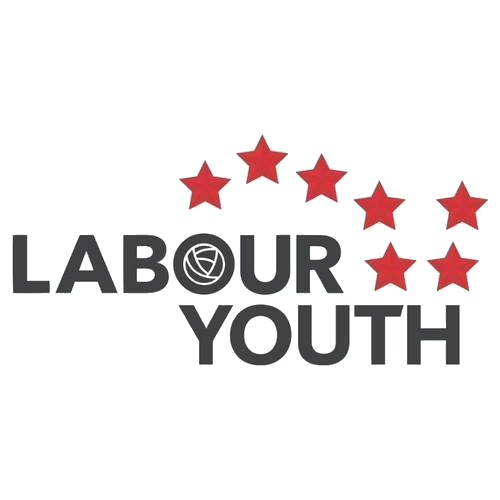
- Chairperson: Aaron Duke
- National Secretary: Lhamo Fitzsimons
- Founded: 1979
- Ideology: Social democracy Democratic socialism Pro-Europeanism
- Mother party: (Republic of Ireland) Labour Party
- International affiliation: International Union of Socialist Youth (IUSY)
- European affiliation: Young European Socialists (YES)
- Newspaper: The Left Tribune
- Website: labouryouth.ie

Labour Youth is the youth wing of the Labour Party of Ireland. Membership is open to those aged from 16 to 30 years old.

== History ==
=== 1979–2000 ===
Labour Youth succeeded the Young Labour League as a full section of the Labour Party in 1979, under party leader Frank Cluskey. Members were active in the election of presidential candidate Mary Robinson, forming a base of membership during the campaign that would provide the backbone of leadership within the organisation for years to come. They provided leadership to the National Youth Council of Ireland and in 1992 were among the founding members of the European Council of Socialist Youth. In 1999, along with the main party, Labour Youth merged with Democratic Left Youth.

=== 2000–present ===
The Spring 2007 issue of Labour Youth's internal publication, The Left Tribune, shows support for abortion and same sex marriage, along with contributions from Michael D. Higgins. In the 2007 general election Labour Youth opposed a pre-election pact with Fine Gael. Also in 2007, it supported the Venezuelan revolution. The Autumn 2007 issue of The Left Tribune promotes Labour Youth's support of Cuba and its endorsement of the International Brigade in Spain, with then Labour Youth Recruitment Officer Enda Duffy featuring in a photograph of a panel at a commemoration event and the noted naming of the UCD Labour Youth branch in honour of Michael O'Riordan. Also in 2009, it collaborated with the Connolly Youth Movement (linked with the Communist Party) on environmental campaigns. The group undertook an active and visible role in the 2011 Irish general election in support of young candidates such as Ciara Conway, Patrick Nulty and Derek Nolan. They later called on the party to abandon talks on forming a coalition government with Fine Gael, describing the proposal as undemocratic.

Since the turn of the 2000s, Labour Youth has run campaigns on repealing the 8th Amendment, opposing sexism, extending voting rights to 16 and 17 year olds, workers rights, same-sex marriage, sexual consent and ending Direct Provision, along with other issues related to students and young people. Labour Youth also takes an active role in supporting young Labour candidates in elections. In 2009, the organisation donated €14,000 to 'young candidates'.

In 2015, Labour Youth released a policy paper on ending Zero Hour contracts and stated that Ireland was leading the way in LGBTQ+ rights. In February 2015, Chairperson Jack Eustace stated that more companies 'should follow Eircom's lead' in job creation. In 2016, it released a document opposing homophobia, transphobia and sexism. In May 2016, at a gathering of the Social Democratic and Labour Party (SDLP) youth group and the Labour Party youth group in Belfast, joint chairs Grace Williams (LY) and Conal Browne (SDLP) emphasised the importance of young people supporting the EU. In June 2016, Labour Youth released a statement saying that they were 'deeply shocked' by the UK-EU Referendum result.

In 2017, Labour Youth released a document proposing state funded tuition for higher level education. In November 2016, former USI President Kevin Donoghue had been elected Chairperson of Labour Youth at the organisation's annual conference. In 2017, Labour Youth condemned the income-contingent loan scheme and launched a campaign for workers to be paid the Living Wage. In December 2017, actions by Labour Youth in Maynooth had been condemned as "juvenile" and "disrespectful" after 'F*** the Pope' was posted twice from their official social media account. An image of the Communications Officer of Labour Youth, Liam Haughey, was posted with him holding a sign which read "I am pro-choice because… F*** the Pope". The Labour Party released a statement acknowledging the posts, saying they were brought to the party's General Secretary but had since been removed.

In March 2018, Labour Youth welcomed the board of Trinity College's decision to make concessions on two of the Take Back Trinity movement's demands – to scrap the €450 charge for supplemental exams and granting fee certainty fees for postgraduate and international students. Labour Youth also called on Ryanair to 'address the concerns of pilots'. In late 2018, in the midst of Ireland's housing crisis, Labour Youth distanced itself from claims by the Labour Party leadership that direct actions such as occupations of buildings were not a valid form of political protest. This was followed by then Labour Youth Chairperson Chloe Manahan stating "Civil disobedience and protest have been core to this movement since its inception. It is crucial that Labour activists feel supported and empowered to do what is moral, just and right – not simply what is allowed".

Labour Youth played an active role in the 2019 Irish local elections supporting several of their members who ran for local councils. Former Chair Kevin Donoghue was elected to Dublin City Council while former Secretary Ciara Galvin was elected to Kildare County Council. Labour Youth members canvassed for the United Kingdom's Labour Party in the 2019 United Kingdom general election. In 2019, Labour Youth reiterated its support of the EU. In September 2019, a Labour Youth campaign on 'decent housing for all' was launched by Chairperson Patrick Ahern.

Following his election at the Labour Youth National Conference in Waterford city, which was held on the weekend before 25 November 2019, Cormac Ó Braonáin was Labour Youth's Chairperson until his death on 15 December 2019. In the weeks following his death Adrian McCarthy announced his candidacy for chair and was subsequently elected in March 2020.

The year 2020 saw the re-expansion of Labour Youth branches at council level, such as the Labour Youth Lucan-Palmerstown Branch. June 2020 also saw long term Labour Youth activist and former National Youth Executive officer Declan Meenagh co-opted to Dublin City Council to replace Senator Marie Sherlock. Legally blind, Meenagh has long been known for his local activism in the Cabra-Glasnevin area along with his work on disability rights.

Labour Youth released a post-coronavirus society document in July 2020. In it included the retention of rent freezes, permanent state-ownership of hospitals, a 'revamp' of industrial relations, opposition to 'green' capitalism, the implementation of Slaintecare and a 'vast' housing programme, universal childcare, commitment to co-operatives, public ownership, cultural vibrancy, LQBTQ+ friendly spaces, the ending of worker exploitation, an overhaul of education and climate justice.

== Structure ==
As a prominently student organisation, Labour Youth has long had a presence in many universities and (formerly) institutes of technology across Ireland. Originally confined to the larger universities such as Trinity, UCD and UCC, in more recent years efforts have been made to expand.

Labour Youth is currently represented in:

- Trinity College, Dublin
- University College Dublin
- Dublin City University
- Dublin Institute of Technology
- University College Cork
- Maynooth University
- Institute of Technology, Carlow
- National University of Ireland, Galway
- Cork Institute of Technology

Constituency/Combined Constituency level:

- Dublin South-West
- Dublin South-Central
- Dublin Central
- Dublin Bay North
- Dublin Rathdown
- Dublin West
- Dublin Mid-West
- Kildare North
- Kildare South
- Louth-Meath
- Northern Ireland
- Tipperary
- Wexford
- Wicklow
- Cork East
- Carlow–Kilkenny
- Cork South-Central
- Cork North-Central

Council level:

- Labour Youth Lucan-Palmerstown Branch

== Executive ==
The National Executive Committee (NEC) is responsible for the day-to-day running of Labour Youth. Officers are elected for two year terms to the NEC at every second Youth Conference, held in November each year. Officers elected prior to the constitutional changes passed at the 2023 November conference were elected on one year terms to the National Youth Executive (NYE).

The role of Labour Party Youth & Development Officer, is an ex-officio, non-voting member of the NEC (previously NYE). There is currently no sitting officer in this role as due to the electoral focus of the party no selection process has been initiated since lapsing in 2024. The last holder of this position was Sumyrah Khan.

Current Executive

| Executive Position | Officer | Constituency |
|---|---|---|
| National Chairperson | Aaron Duke | Dublin Central |
| National Secretary | Lhamo Fitzsimons | Wicklow |
| Campaigns Officer | Muhammad Janjua | Dublin Mid-West |
| International Secretary | Dhruv Kadam | Dublin Central |
| Policy & Education Officer | Conor Daye | Wicklow |
| Membership & Recruitment Officer | Matthew Butt | Dublin Mid-West |
| Gender & Equality Officer | Siobhán O'Halloran | Dublin Rathdown |
| Communications Officer | Mia Ellison | Dublin Bay North |

Former National Chairs

| Leader | Term |
|---|---|
| John Kelleher | 1979–1980 |
| Michael Martin | 1980–1983 |
| Ray McLoughlin | 1983–1985 |
| Michael Barry | 1985–1988 |
| Vincent Byrne | 1988–1989 |
| Paddy Glackin | 1989–1991 |
| Edward Dawson | 1991–1993 |
| Desmond Cullen | 1993–1994 |
| Fearghal O'Boyle | 1994–1996 |
| David Leech | 1996–1997 |
| Mark Garrett | 1997–1999 |
| Cian O'Callaghan | 1999–2001 |
| Alan Kelly | 1999–2001 |
| Áine Morris | 2001–2002 |
| Rebecca Moynihan | 2002–2004 |
| Donal Lyons | 2004–2005 |
| Graham Ó Maonaigh | 2005–2006 |
| Patrick Nulty | 2006–2007 |
| Enda Duffy | 2007–2008 |
| Gary Honer | 2008–2009 |
| Rory Geraghty | 2009–2010 |
| Colm Lawless | 2010–2011 |
| Conor Ryan | 2011–2012 |
| Aideen Carberry | 2012–2013 |
| Ciarán Garrett | 2013–2014 |
| Jack Eustace | 2014–2015 |
| Grace Williams | 2015–2016 |
| Kevin Donoghue | 2016–2017 |
| Chloe Manahan | 2017–2018 |
| Patrick Ahern | 2018–2019 |
| Cormac Ó Braonáin | 2019 |
| Adrian McCarthy | 2020 |
| Sarah Noville | 2020–2021 |
| James Kearney | 2021–2022 |
| Hugh Murphy | 2022–2023 |
| Lhamo Fitzsimons | 2023 |
| Tadgh Quill-Manley | 2023–2026 |
| Aaron Duke | 2026– |

== Tom Johnson Summer School ==
The Tom Johnson Summer School is held annually in July and has been going since 1994. It is named after Thomas Johnson, the first leader of the Labour Party and the only leader of the party to date to serve as the leader of the opposition in Dáil Éireann. At Tom Johnson, panel discussions are held on a number of topics connected to the broad theme, with speakers from within and outside of the Party.

== Publications ==
Labour Youth publishes The Left Tribune on a regular basis.
