= 2011 Dublin West by-election =

By-election to the 31st Dáil

- 27 October 2011
- Turnout: 36,391 (58.3%)
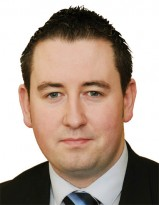

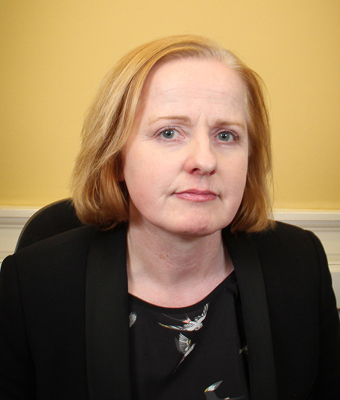
	Nulty
Nominee	Patrick Nulty	David McGuinness	Ruth Coppinger
Party	Labour	Fianna Fáil	Socialist Party
First preferences	8,665	7,742	7,542
Percentage	24.3%	21.7%	21.1%
Final count	17,636	11,590	–
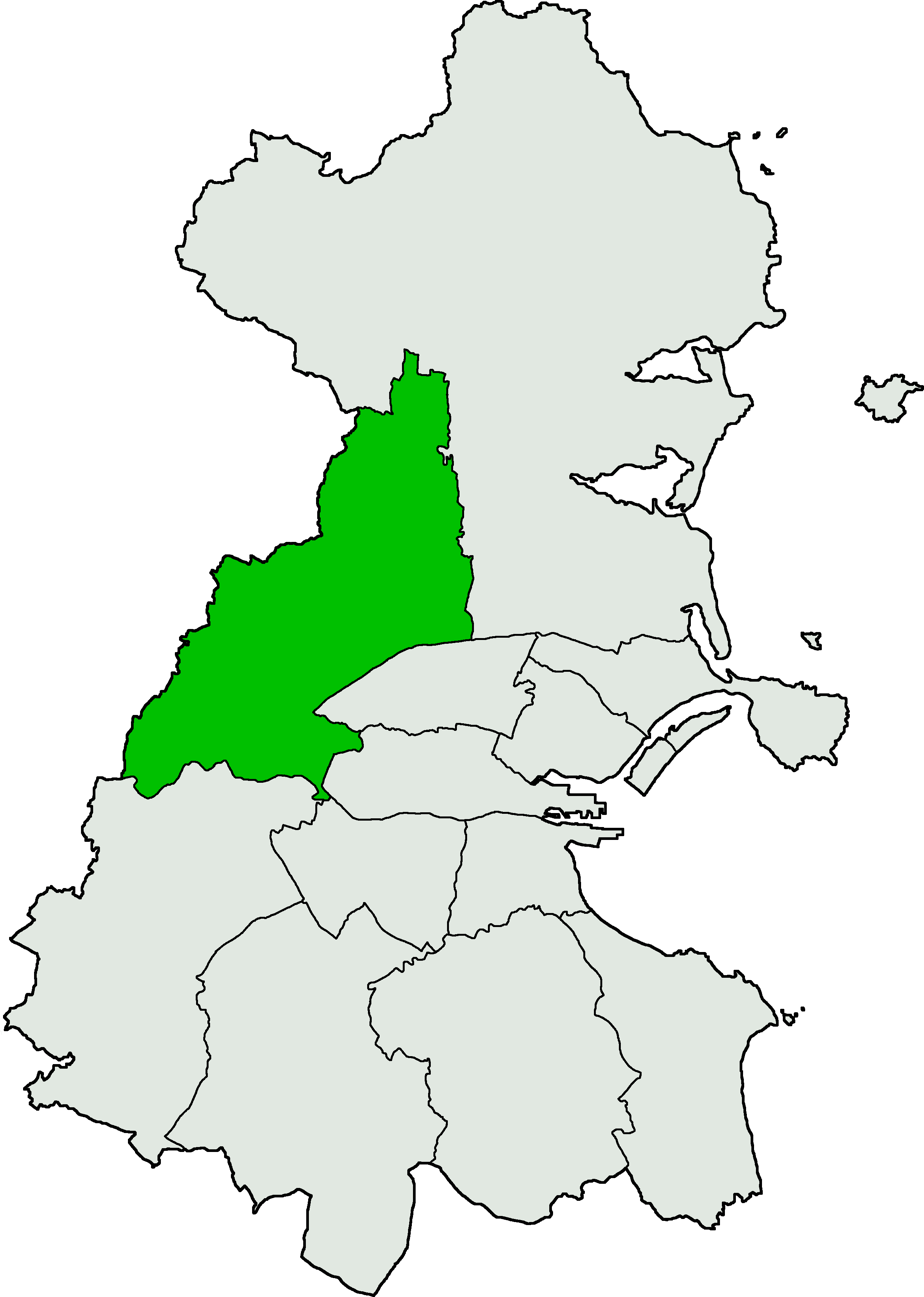
- Dublin West shown within County Dublin
TD before election
Brian Lenihan Jnr
Fianna Fáil
TD after election
Patrick Nulty
Labour

A Dáil by-election was held in the constituency of Dublin West in Ireland on Thursday, 27 October 2011, to fill a vacancy in the 31st Dáil. It followed the death of Fianna Fáil Teachta Dála (TD) Brian Lenihan Jnr on 10 June 2011.

The 2011 Irish presidential election and two constitutional referendums were held on the same day. The Labour candidate Patrick Nulty was elected on the fifth count.

== Candidates ==
Thirteen candidates contested the by-election. Four were members of Fingal County Council: David McGuinness of Fianna Fáil, Eithne Loftus of Fine Gael, Patrick Nulty of the Labour Party, and Ruth Coppinger of the Socialist Party. The other party candidates were Paul Donnelly of Sinn Féin, Roderic O'Gorman of the Green Party and Peadar Ó Ceallaigh of Fís Nua.

There were six independent candidates: Gary Bermingham, a satirical actor and artist; Benny Cooney, a FÁS employee; Brendan Doris, an architect; Barry Caesar Hunt, a contestant in The Apprentice reality television show in 2010; John Frank Kidd, a retired fire officer; and Jim Tallon, a farmer.

Donnelly, McGuinness, Nulty and O'Gorman had all been unsuccessful candidates in this constituency at the general election in February 2011. Bermingham, Cooney, Ó Ceallaigh and Tallon had been candidates in other constituencies at the same election.

== Result ==
2011 Dublin West by-election
Party	Candidate	FPv%	Count				
Party	Candidate	FPv%	1	2	3	4	5
Labour	Patrick Nulty	24.3	8,665	8,885	10,186	13,027	17,636
Fianna Fáil	David McGuinness	21.7	7,742	7,935	8,720	9,873	11,590
Socialist Party	Ruth Coppinger	21.1	7,542	7,834	9,368	9,873	
Fine Gael	Eithne Loftus	14.7	5,263	5,410	5,942		
Sinn Féin	Paul Donnelly	8.9	3,173	3,309			
Green	Roderic O'Gorman	5.0	1,787	1,925			
Independent	Barry Caesar Hunt	2.2	775				
Independent	John Frank Kidd	0.9	311				
Independent	Gary Bermingham	0.5	185				
Independent	Brendan Doris	0.3	95				
Independent	Jim Tallon	0.2	73				
Independent	Benny Cooney	0.1	51				
Fís Nua	Peadar Ó Ceallaigh	0.1	40				
Electorate: 62,396 Valid: 35,702 Spoilt: 689 (1.9%) Quota: 17,852 Turnout: 36,391 (58.3%)

A full recount was ordered after only 18 votes separated Socialist Party candidate Ruth Coppinger from Fianna Fáil candidate David McGuinness. After the recount, both McGuinness and Coppinger had the same number of votes in the fourth count. Under electoral law Coppinger was eliminated, for McGuinness had more first-preference votes.

It was the first time since the 1982 Galway East by-election that a candidate of a governing party won a by-election, and the first since the 1976 Dublin South-West by-election to have transferred a seat from an opposition party to a government party. The result left Fianna Fáil with no TDs in Dublin city and County.
