= Anti-Bin Tax Campaign =

Opposition to refuse collection fees in Ireland

The Anti-Bin Tax Campaign opposed the introduction of bin charges (garbage-collection fees) by local authorities in Ireland. The campaign centred largely in city areas, in particular Dublin. It was locally based with some co-ordination in the Dublin area. Non-payment was the tactic used against the charge.

The campaign was supported by a variety of people from community and minor political groupings, such as Socialist Party, Socialist Workers Party, Irish Socialist Network, Workers Solidarity Movement and Working Class Action.

== Imprisonment of protesters and result of campaign ==
In Autumn 2003, after years of mass non-payment the Dublin local authorities began non-collection; leading to protests and blockades of bin trucks. In the High Court Fingal County Council sought an injunction and the imprisonment of Joe Higgins and Clare Daly of the Socialist Party, and Irish Socialist Network members John O'Neill and Colm Breathnach. These imprisonments escalated the campaign and for a number of weeks refuse collection in the Dublin area was severely disrupted due to protests. In total 22 people were imprisoned.

The campaign failed in its objective to reverse the introduction of bin charges. In the years to follow, many councils privatised refuse collection services.

The campaign was described by The Phoenix Magazine as "an abject failure" which "left many thousands of families across Dublin in financial and legal difficulty, it proved a useful campaign and publicity tool for SP candidates in a number of constituencies"

== 2004 local elections ==
At the 2004 local elections following the non-collection phase of the campaign Anti-Bin Tax a number of candidates were elected. The Socialist Party gained two seats, one on Cork City Council and one on South Dublin County Council, bringing its total up to four. Joan Collins, running as an Independent, won a seat in the Crumlin-Kimmage local electoral area on Dublin City Council.

Cieran Perry of Working Class Action running as an independent narrowly missed election by 93 votes in Cabra, polling 1,753 votes. Dublin city chair of 'Stop the Bin Tax campaign' Joe Mooney ran in the Dublin North Inner City electoral ward unsuccessfully.

Joe Mooney was involved in one of the most prominent incidents of the Anti-Bin Tax Campaign when he was hit by a Dublin City Council truck while the campaign tried to blockade a bin truck depot, he was carried down a road by a bin truck, before falling off. He was slightly injured.
