= Bunting (surname) =

Bunting is a surname. Notable people with the surname include:

- Shane Bunting, (born 1975) better known as Madchild; Canadian-born rap artist
- Arthur Bunting (1936–2017), British rugby league footballer and coach
- Basil Bunting (1900–1985), British modernist poet
- Bill Bunting (born 1947), American basketball player
- Chris Bunting, British comic book writer
- Christopher Bunting (1925–2005), English cellist
- Christopher William Bunting (1837–1896), Irish-born Canadian politician
- David Michael Bunting (born 1960), British poet/musician
- Edward Bunting (1773–1843), Irish musician
- Edward L. Bunting (1883–1962), English cricketer
- Eve Bunting (born 1928), Californian author
- George Bunting, American politician
- Heinrich Bünting (1545–1606), German pastor, theologian and mapmaker
- Hem Bunting (born 1985), Cambodian athlete
- Ian Bunting (born 1996), American football player
- Jabez Bunting (1779–1858), British Wesleyan Methodist minister
- Jo Bunting, television producer
- John Bunting (serial killer) (born 1966), Australian serial killer
- John Bunting (coach) (born 1950), American football coach
- Josiah Bunting III (born 1939), American educator
- La Farrell Bunting (born 1980), American boxer
- Madeleine Bunting (born 1964), British journalist
- Mary Bunting (1910–1998), American President of Radcliffe College
- Michael Bunting (born 1995), Canadian ice hockey player
- Robert Franklin Bunting (1828–1891), American Presbyterian minister and Confederate chaplain.
- Ronald Bunting, British army officer
- Ronnie Bunting (died 1980), Irish political activist
- Sean Murphy-Bunting (born 1997), American football player
- Stephen Bunting (born 1985), English darts player
- Thomas L. Bunting (1844–1898), American politician
- Terry Bunting (born c. 1935), Canadian retired footballer
- William Bunting (1874–1947), English rugby player
- William Bunting (eco-warrior) (1916–1995), English environmentalist and eco-warrior

Fictional characters:

- Reverend Bunting, character in The Invisible Man
