= Cyril Toman =

- Education: Queen's University Belfast
- Occupation: Teacher
- Political party: Sinn Féin; People's Democracy; Irish Workers' Group; Northern Ireland Labour Party
- Movement: Northern Ireland Civil Rights Association

Cyril Toman was a political activist in Northern Ireland.

Toman attended Queen's University Belfast, where he joined the Labour Club, and also the Belfast Willowfield branch of the Northern Ireland Labour Party (NILP). He visited the Soviet Union as the group's representative in 1964. In 1965 - 66, he edited the Labour Club's Impact journal, and was the President of the Literific, the university's debating society. He also became Chair of the NILP Young Socialists, and joined the revolutionary socialist Irish Workers' Group.

On leaving university, Toman became a schoolteacher in Newtownards. He joined the Young Socialist Alliance, and became a prominent leader of People's Democracy, whose other members included Michael Farrell and Eamonn McCann, contemporaries of his at university. Through the Alliance, he and Farrell were the main promoters of the Belfast to Derry march in 1968 which culminated in the Burntollet Bridge incident.

Toman stood for People's Democracy in Mid Armagh at the 1969 Northern Ireland general election, where he took 27.7% of the vote.

In 1969, he was an organiser of a civil rights march from Belfast to Dublin. At the border customs post, he presented two books which had been condemned by the Roman Catholic Church, The Ginger Man and The Girl With Green Eyes, the first of which was then banned in the Republic of Ireland, to challenge that state's censorship laws. This proved controversial within the movement; Toman was also criticised for organising the march badly. Following Bloody Sunday (1972), he visited Armagh and Dublin to raise support before travelling to attempt to defend Free Derry. Once there, he spoke at public meetings to "keep up morale".

Toman later joined Sinn Féin, and he stood unsuccessfully for the organisation in South Down at the 1982 Northern Ireland Assembly election. He later moved to Australia.
