= Peter Graham (Marxist) =

Irish republican and Marxist (1945–1971)

- Born: 1946; Dublin, Ireland
- Died: 25 October 1971 (aged 26) near St Stephen's Green, Dublin, Ireland
- Cause of death: Gunshot
- Employer: CIÉ
- Organization(s): Connolly Youth Movement, Irish Workers' Group, People's Democracy (Ireland), Saor Éire
- Known for: Irish republicanism

Peter Graham (1945 – 25 October 1971) was an Irish republican and Marxist who worked as an electrician.

Graham was a member of various left-wing movements, a founder of the Young Socialists, and some sources identify him as a leader in the militant Saor Éire organisation.

He was killed in his flat in Dublin in unclear circumstances in October 1971.

== Early life ==
Graham was born in 1945 with father Joseph Graham and raised in The Coombe, Dublin.

Graham was born into a Catholic family, but relinquished religion later in life.

== Activism ==
Graham worked as an electrician for the CIÉ and was a trade union activist in Ireland and London, England.

Briefly a Labour Party member, Graham left in disillusionment and became a Trotskyite joining the Connolly Youth Movement and the Trotskyist Irish Workers Group (IWG) in 1967. After growing dissatisfied with the ideological stance of the IWG, Graham left and started the League for a Worker's Republic. He was also the chair of the Young Socialists and a member of the International Marxist Group.

After IWG collapsed, some members started the People's Democracy organisation, with some of them starting the Saor Éire organisation. While sources identify Graham as a member of Saor Éire, This Week magazine rejects that. He organised a meeting bringing Saor Éire and others together in 1968. He was friends with D.R. O’Connor Lysaght, who both broke away from the International Marxist Group.

== Death ==
On 25 October 1971 he was murdered in his own flat on St Stephen's Green, Dublin by rivals in Saor Éire, who accused him of being a police informant. Graham was tortured with a hammer and shot in the neck. He was 26.

While magazine This Week reported that Graham's friends attribute his death to a false accusation of being a police informant and also suggested his death was possibly linked to a gun smuggling operation.

Journalist Charlie Bird spoke at his funeral. Both Charlie Bird and Tariq Ali raised a clenched fist at the cemetery.

The Provisional Irish Republican Army issued a statement thanking him for his support.
