= D. R. O'Connor Lysaght =

Irish Marxist historian (1941–2021)

Daniel Rayner O'Connor Lysaght
- Born: Daniel Rayner Connor Lysaght; 30 January 1941; Llanishen, Wales
- Died: 2 July 2021 (aged 80); Beaumont Hospital, Dublin, Ireland
- Education: Trinity College Dublin
- Occupations: Historian and writer
- Organisation(s): Revolutionary Marxist Group (Ireland); Fourth International (post-reunification)
- Known for: Marxism
- Political party: National Progressive Democrats
- Movement: Trotskyism
- Family: Feargus O'Connor

Daniel Rayner O'Connor Lysaght, informally known as Rayner, (30 January 1941 – 2 July 2021) was a Welsh-born Irish revolutionary Marxist, a historian and an author.

Born in Llanishen in 1941, a descendant of Feargus O'Connor, Lysaght spent his adult life in Dublin after studying at Trinity College.

He co-founded the Revolutionary Marxist Group and co-lead the Red Mole journal.

He died in Dublin in 2022.

== Early life and education ==
Lysaght was born in Llanishen, on January 30, 1941 to a surgeon father Arthur Lysaght and Jacqueline Lysaght (née Heard) from Wales and had a brother William and a sister Priscilla Stewart.

He was a descendant of Feargus O'Connor the radical Irish chartist. While his family spelled their name Conner, he adapted it to O'Connor as a tribute to Feargus O'Connor.

Lysaght studied at Trinity College Dublin where he developed a reputation as a left-wing activist.

== Career and activism ==
Lysaght was an influential historian a Trotskyist, and a member of the National Progressive Democrats. He was a writer, and his publications included a pamphlet on the Limerick Soviet the de facto governing body that ruled Limerick for two weeks in 1919.

He co-founded the Revolutionary Marxist Group, the Irish section of the Fourth International later becoming a member of the People's Democracy in 1974 when the groups merged. With Peter Graham, Lysaght organised the Irish Workers Group and the British International Marxist Group to join the Fourth International. They published the Red Mole journal until Graham's murder in 1971.

He lived on Clanawley Road in Killester, Dublin.

== Selected publications ==
=== Books ===
- The Republic of Ireland (1971)
- End of a liberal: the literary politics of Conor Cruise O'Brien (1977)
- The Republic of Ireland: an hypothesis in eight chapters and two intermissions (1970)
- Story of the Limerick Soviet, April 1919 (1981)
- Early history of Irish Trotskyism (1981)
- Towards a history of the Communist Party of Ireland (1972)
- Preliminary remarks on the question of the protestants in Northern Ireland (1971)
- First three socialist internationals (1989)
- Story of the Limerick Soviet, the 1919 general strike against British militarism (1984)
- The making of Northern Ireland (1970)
- The Communists and the Irish revolution (1993)
- The great Irish revolution: myths and realities : a handbook (2006)

=== Essays ===
- A. Saorstat is born: The birth of the Irish Free State, in the 1991 book Ireland's Histories, Aspects of State, Society and Ideology, edited by Sean Hutton and Paul Stewart. New York, Routledge, 1991.

== Death ==
Lysaght died on the 2 July 2022 in Beaumont Hospital, Dublin His funeral was held at the Glasnevin Crematorium, with small numbers in attendance due to the COVID-19 pandemic.
