= Irish Workers' Group (1976) =

Irish Workers Group
- Founded: 1976
- Split from: Socialist Workers' Movement
- Ideology: Communism; Trotskyism; Dissident Irish Republicanism
- Political position: Far-left
- Regional affiliation: Workers' Power (UK); Socialist Labour Party (Ireland)
- International affiliation: League for the Fifth International

See Irish Workers' Group for the Irish Workers' Group which was active in the 1960s.

The Irish Workers Group was a small Trotskyist political group in Ireland.

The party was formed in 1976 as a breakaway from the Socialist Workers' Movement, taking a more rigorously Trotskyist line and stronger position on the North and women's rights. It was affiliated to the League for the Fifth International (L5I).

The group was active in several places in Ireland, notably Dublin, Derry and Galway, and published a magazine called Class Struggle between 1977 and 1995, as well as publications on James Connolly, the Irish question and the Troubles, where they shared the position of Workers Power in Great Britain, giving unconditional support to the Provisional Irish Republican Army and opposing the Good Friday Agreement. They criticised what they deemed as the nationalist and centrist Marxism positions of other groups on the Irish left, such as the League for a Workers Republic, Socialist Democracy and the Socialist Workers Movement on this question. Throughout their existence, they stood for the defence of what they perceived as the forces fighting British imperialism, such as the Continuity IRA and the Real IRA.

When the Socialist Labour Party was formed, the Irish Workers Group joined the party as a tendency, but left in 1979. In 1989, it formed part of the League for the Fifth International (L5I) when that group was founded, through which it was associated with Workers Power (UK). In 2006, most of the remaining Irish supporters of the L5I were expelled along with the Permanent Revolution group in the UK.

A small group called Workers Power, briefly active in the mid-2000s, remained affiliated with the L5I, but does not appear to have been directly connected with the Irish Workers' Group.
