= Bunting =

Bunting may refer to:

== Birds ==
- Emberiza, a group of Old World passerine birds
- Passerina, a group of birds in the Cardinalidae family known as the North American buntings
- Blue bunting, Cyanocompsa parellina
- Lark bunting, Calamospiza melanocorys
- Plectrophenax, snow and McKay's buntings
- Lapland longspur or Lapland bunting, Calcarius lapponicus

== Other uses ==
- Bunting (animal behavior)
- Bunting (decoration), festive decorations
- Bunting (horse) (1961–1985/86), the name of a Swedish horse
- Bunting (surname), including a list of people with the name
- Bunt (baseball), a batting technique
- Stephen Bunting, English Darts Player
- Shane Bunting, Canadian rapper and record executive

== See also ==
- Bye, baby Bunting, a nursery rhyme
