= Ronnie Bunting =

Irish Republican activist (1948–1980)

Personal details
- Born: Ronald Bunting; 10 January 1948 Belfast, Northern Ireland
- Died: 15 October 1980 (aged 32) Turf Lodge, Belfast, Northern Ireland
- Cause of death: Assassinated
- Party: Irish Republican Socialist Party (1979–1980) Republican Clubs (1970–1974) People's Democracy (1968–1970)
- Spouse: Suzanne Bunting
- Children: 3
- Parent: Ronald Bunting
- Education: Queen's University Belfast
- Nickname: Captain Green

Military service
- Paramilitary: Irish National Liberation Army (1974–1980); Official Irish Republican Army (1970–1974)
- Rank: Officer Commanding
- Unit: Belfast Brigade
- Battles/wars: The Troubles

Ronnie Bunting (10 January 1948 – 15 October 1980) was a Protestant Irish republican and socialist activist in Ireland. He became a member of the Official IRA in the early 1970s and was a founder-member of the Irish National Liberation Army (INLA) in 1974. He became leader of the INLA in 1978 and was assassinated in 1980 aged 32.

== Background ==
Bunting came from an Ulster Protestant family in East Belfast. His father, Ronald Bunting, had been a major in the British Army and Ronnie grew up in various military barracks around the world. Ronnie's father became a supporter and associate of Ian Paisley and ran for election under the Protestant Unionist Party banner. Journalist Walter Ellis, who was Bunting's cousin and also a Protestant left-wing advocate of a united Ireland, recalled him in their teenage years as domineering with violent tendencies. Ellis was expelled from Orangefield High School after setting fire to the prefects' room at Bunting's urging.

Having completed his education and graduating from Queen's University Belfast, Ronnie Bunting briefly became a history teacher in Belfast, but later become involved in the Northern Ireland Civil Rights Association and then with Irish republican organisations.

In opposition to the overwhelming unionism of his Protestant background, Bunting became a militant republican. His father, by contrast, was a committed Ulster loyalist who, heeding the call of Paisley, had organised armed stewards for counter-demonstrations against civil rights marches. His men had been at the Burntollet Bridge incident on 4 January 1969, when the Belfast to Derry People's Democracy march was brutally ambushed. The younger Bunting had joined People's Democracy the year before at Queens, but then in 1970 joined Official Sinn Féin (which used the name Republican Clubs in Northern Ireland).

Despite their political differences, Ronnie remained close to his father. Bunting married his wife Suzanne in 1969 while still a student.

== Membership of the Official IRA ==
Some time around 1970, as a result of his left wing, secular interpretation of Irish republicanism, as well as a belief in the necessity of armed revolution, Bunting joined the Official Irish Republican Army (OIRA). (The other wing of the IRA—the Provisional Irish Republican Army—was more nationalist and Catholic in its outlook.) At the time, the communal conflict known as the Troubles was beginning and the Official IRA was involved in shootings and bombings. Along with many others, Bunting was interned in November 1971, and held in Long Kesh until the following April (see also Operation Demetrius).

== Membership of the INLA ==
In 1974, Bunting followed Seamus Costello and other militants who disagreed with the OIRA's ceasefire of 1972, into a new grouping calling itself the Irish National Liberation Army (INLA), and aligned with the Irish Republican Socialist Party (IRSP). Immediately, a violent feud broke out between the OIRA and the INLA.

In January 1975, Costello made a scathing accusation against the Belfast leadership of the Official IRA, accusing them of drawing up a death list of four individuals associated with the INLA/IRSP, one of which was Bunting. He stated that masked men had visited the Bunting home looking for Ronnie. Discovering he wasn't home, they fired two shots and narrowly missed his wife and infant daughter.

In February 1975, the Official IRA attacked a house where Bunting and Seán and Harry Flynn were hiding in near the Antrim Road with a machine gun.

On 5 March 1975, Bunting survived an assassination attempt when he was shot by an Official IRA sniper when driving out of the Turf Lodge area of West Belfast. He was taken to the Royal Victoria Hospital on the Falls Road and survived.

The attempts on Bunting's life caused serious distress to his wife, resulting in him and his family moving to Wales until July 1975, when he moved to Dublin. He later returned to Belfast in late 1976, becoming the Commanding officer of the Belfast INLA. For the remaining two years of his life, Bunting was the military leader of the INLA.

The grouping regularly attacked the British Army and Royal Ulster Constabulary (RUC) in Belfast. Bunting called in claims of responsibility to the media by the code name "Captain Green", mimicking the Ulster Freedom Fighters' code name of "Captain Black". The first instance of this was on 24 November 1976, when a Royal Welsh Fusilier patrol responded to a robbery at Monagh Post Office and Corporal Andrew Crocker was then killed by a sniper. Initially claimed by the Provisional IRA, it was later attributed to the INLA when Bunting called the BBC, using the "Captain Green" code name, and gave technical details of the killing.

Following the Sallins Train Robbery, Bunting was one of 40 who were arrested under section 30 of the Offences against the State Act in early April 1976. On his release, Bunting reported that special branch detectives had beaten him and told him that he was “Northern scum” and that he had no legal rights. He was eventually released

In April 1977, the INLA kidnapped the son of a banker who lived in Whitehead for ransom. Initially believing loyalists were behind the kidnapping, the RUC were surprised to see a Turf Lodge location for the ransom drop-off. The police attempted, but failed, to capture those collecting the £25,000 ransom. Bunting later discovered the RUC were looking for him in relation to the kidnapping, and turned himself in to the nearest police station alongside the SDLP's Paddy Devlin. Bunting was then taken to Castlereagh interrogation centre, where he claimed he was abused, beaten and had the initials 'UVF' scratched on his arm. On being released, he lodged a complaint against the RUC, who in turn charged him with wasting their time. He was convicted and fined a year later, though this decision was reversed on appeal.

In May 1978, Bunting was involved in an attempted INLA robbery of a bank in Mallow, County Cork. The plan failed when one of the unit trigger an alarm, however, a security van was spotted during the escape and gave them ideas for a future robbery. During the June holiday weekend, the same unit, now including Patsy O'Hara, posed as council workers and robbed a security van in the Barna gap, County Galway. Seizing £460,000, they discovered the getaway car's ignition had burned out and had to use a German tourist's car that had stopped at the fake road works to escape. The money and weapons were then hidden in a forest.

During the IRSP's October 1979 Ard Fhéis, Vinty Fegan proposed granting party membership to Bunting. While Bunting was a senior figure in the INLA, and often mistaken as a founder of the IRSP, he had never formally joined the party. He subsequently became a member on the IRSP Ard Chomhairle as the regional delegate for Belfast.

In his final arrest on 8 August 1980, Bunting was detained alongside Seán Flynn and Francis Barry (a member of the Troops Out Movement) and taken to Castlereagh interrogation centre for questioning. He was held for several days, refusing to answer questions. After he was released he gave a statement to the Association for Legal Justice. In it he alleged that he was threatened by two detectives, with one saying "Look at my face. This is the face you’ll see before I kill you." He then requested the names of the detectives, which they refused to give.

== Assassination ==
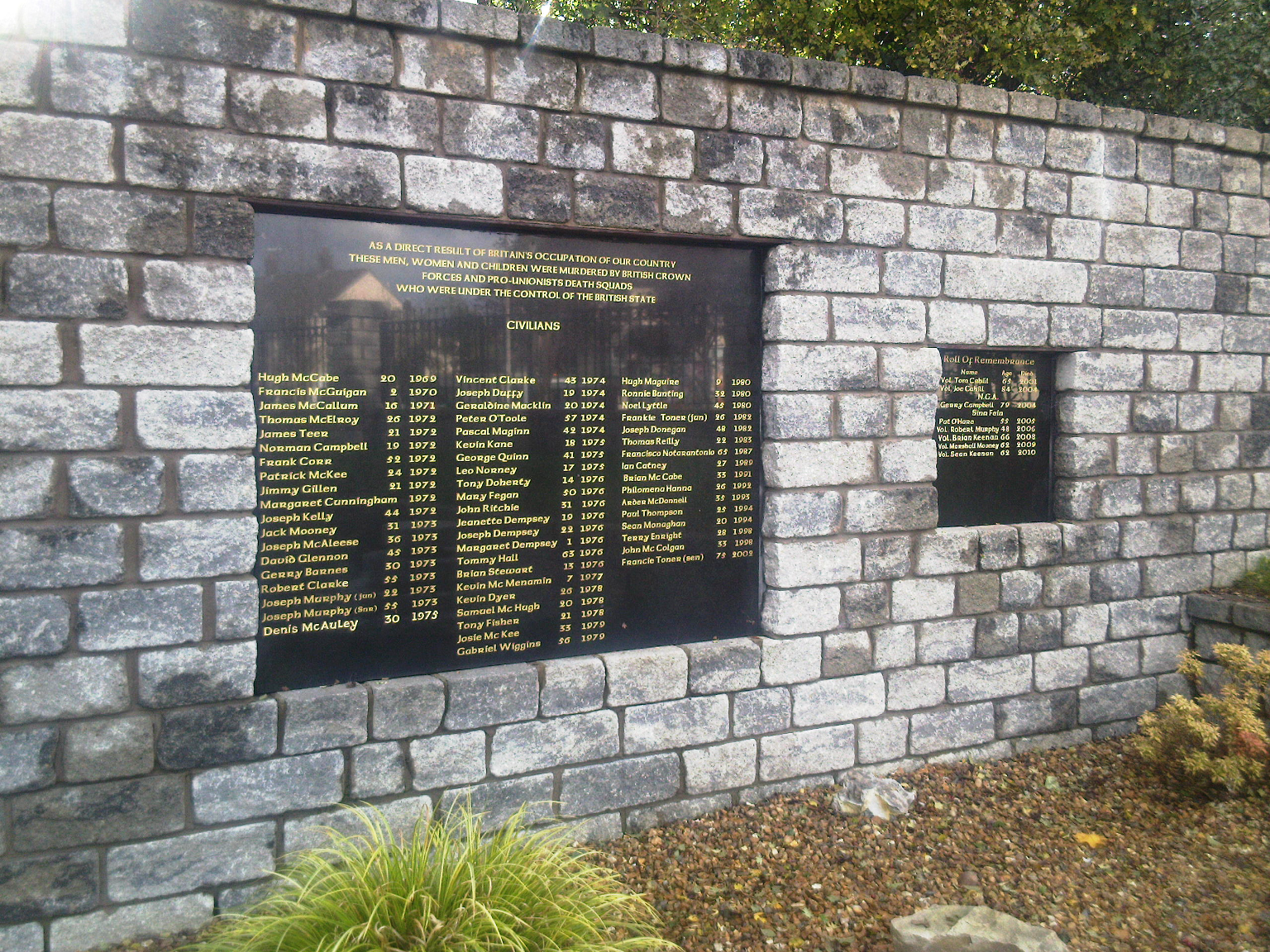
Ronnie Bunting listed, as a civilian, on a roll of honour of republican dead, Springfield Road, Belfast

At about 4:30 a.m. on 15 October 1980, the Buntings were awoken by the sound of banging coming from men with sledgehammers breaking down their door. Within seconds, several gunmen wearing balaclavas stormed the Bunting's home in the Downfine Gardens area of Turf Lodge. They shot Bunting, his wife Suzanne and another INLA man and ex-member of the Red Republican Party, Noel Lyttle, who had been staying there after his recent release from detention. According to The Guardian report by David Beresford,

The shots woke the Buntings' children, age 7 and 3, who ran screaming into the street after discovering their parents lying together at the top of the stairs, covered in blood. Mr Lyttle was shot in bed, near a cot in which the Buntings' baby son was sleeping.

Both Ronnie Bunting and Lyttle were killed. Suzanne Bunting, who was shot in the face, survived her serious injuries. From her hospital bed she stated that the RUC "know, as I do, that the people who killed Ronnie and Noel knew where they could be found, in what rooms, and how best to break down the doors. I told the police what I believe and know in all my heart, that it was the SAS", i.e. a special forces unit of the British Army. i

The attack was claimed by the Ulster Defence Association (UDA), but the INLA claimed the Special Air Service were involved. Despite seven doors being at the top of the stairs, all of the attackers went straight for the Buntings' bedroom.

Upon his death, Bunting's body was kept in a funeral parlour on the Newtownards Road opposite the headquarters of the UDA. On the day of the funeral, as the coffin was being removed, UDA members jeered from their building. The IRSP had wanted a republican paramilitary-style funeral for Bunting but his father refused and had Bunting buried in the family plot of a Church of Ireland cemetery near Donaghadee.
