= 1979 Dublin Corporation election =

Part of the 1979 Irish local elections

- 7 June 1979

All 45 seats on Dublin City Council 23 seats needed for a majority
	First party	Second party	Third party
Party	Fine Gael	Fianna Fáil	Labour
Seats won	15	12	4
	Fourth party
Party	Sinn Féin The Workers' Party
Seats won	1

An election to all 45 seats on the council of Dublin Corporation took place on 7 June 1979 as part of the 1979 Irish local elections. The city of Dublin was divided into 11 borough electoral areas (BEAs) to elect councillors for a five-year term of office on the electoral system of proportional representation by means of the single transferable vote (PR-STV). The term was extended to 1985.

== Boundary changes ==
At the previous election, there were nine BEAs. This was revised in 1979 to 11 BEAs.

== Results by party ==
Party	Seats	±	1st pref	FPv%	±%
Fine Gael	15			29.3	
Fianna Fáil	12			27.1	
Labour	4			18.3	
Sinn Féin The Workers' Party	1			4.9	
Sinn Féin	0	Steady		0.8	
Socialist Labour	0	New		3.4	
Communist	0	Steady		0.2	
Independent	6				
Total	45	Steady	170,256	100.00	—N/a

Candidates marked below as Community were Independent Non-Party candidates who had added the word Community to their names by deed poll.

== Results by local electoral area ==
*: Outgoing councillor.

=== Area No. 1 ===
The wards of Baldoyle, Beann Éadair A, Beann Éadair B, Clontarf East A, Clontarf East B, Clontarf East C, Coolock A, Raheny A, and Raheny B.

Area No. 1: 4 seats
Party	Candidate	FPv%	Count										
Party	Candidate	FPv%	1	2	3	4	5	6	7	8	9	10	11
Independent	Seán Dublin Bay Rockall Loftus	27.7	4,957										
Fine Gael	Michael Joe Cosgrave	18.0	3,222	3,464	3,495	3,577	3,596						
Fianna Fáil	Michael Woods	11.8	2,109	2,243	2,259	2,362	2,681	2,743	2,800	2,882	3,042	3,047	3,227
Fianna Fáil	Ned Brennan	11.6	2,076	2,155	2,173	2,239	2,420	2,446	2,482	2,527	2,627	2,628	2,865
Labour	Tom Duffy	5.6	1,006	1,101	1,127	1,135	1,144	1,251	1,710	1,804	2,061	2,064	
Fine Gael	Mary Byrne	5.1	921	1,089	1,091	1,101	1,127	1,155	1,228	1,843	2,178	2,183	2,935
Fine Gael	Dermot Melia	4.3	778	895	902	911	933	955	1,001				
Labour	Michael Martin	3.3	599	662	678	680	686	854					
Community	Noel Nutley	3.2	582	921	972	985	999	1,071	1,112	1,180			
Sinn Féin The Workers' Party	Seamus Phelan	3.1	557	593	641	646	651						
Fianna Fáil	Sheila Quinn	2.8	494	550	554	625							
Fianna Fáil	Noel Peers	2.0	351	371	381								
Independent	Val Lynch	1.4	257	283									
Electorate: 31,883 Valid: 17,909 Spoilt: 140 Quota: 3,582 Turnout: 56.61%

=== Area No. 2 ===
The wards of Artane A, Artane B, Artane C, Artane D, Artane E, Clontarf East E, Clontarf West A, Clontarf West B, Coolock B, Coolock C, and Coolock D.

Area No. 2: 4 seats
Party	Candidate	FPv%	Count												
Party	Candidate	FPv%	1	2	3	4	5	6	7	8	9	10	11	12	13
Fine Gael	George Birmingham	13.9	2,156	2,162	2,203	2,227	2,244	2,264	2,296	2,347	2,385	2,464	2,583	3,775	
Fianna Fáil	Eugene Timmons	13.6	2,114	2,116	2,131	2,137	2,363	2,676	2,704	3,005	3,056	3,109			
Fine Gael	Ray Fay	9.9	1,536	1,540	1,573	1,593	1,640	1,660	1,687	1,722	1,767	1,822	1,904		
Labour	Michael O'Halloran	9.5	1,475	1,478	1,513	1,529	1,539	1,553	1,638	1,655	1,774	2,039	2,127	2,270	2,542
Labour	Seán Kenny	7.9	1,231	1,244	1,266	1,303	1,312	1,319	1,349	1,425	1,531	2,096	2,178	2,331	2,617
Labour	Jimmy Byrne	7.2	1,118	1,120	1,130	1,170	1,174	1,185	1,226	1,249	1,334				
Socialist Labour	Bert Bennett	6.0	923	926	951	1,104	1,109	1,114	1,338	1,360	1,920	2,067	2,129	2,203	2,320
Fianna Fáil	Ita Green	5.4	832	839	848	861	911	1,026	1,037	1,326	1,351	1,391			
Socialist Labour	Jim Maher	5.1	788	789	809	886	894	907	1,150	1,178					
Fianna Fáil	Jimmy Hutton	4.8	742	744	748	763	807	920	926						
Socialist Labour	Dave Neligan	4.4	689	692	703	750	755	763							
Fianna Fáil	P. J. Mara	3.8	590	592	597	599	663								
Fianna Fáil	Gerald Russell	3.3	504	504	505	508									
Socialist Labour	Mairin Breheny	2.9	448	453	469										
Independent	Austin McCoy	1.6	245	295											
Independent	Ann Creighton	0.7	107												
Electorate: 32,163 Valid: 15,498 Spoilt: 229 Quota: 3,100 Turnout: 48.90%

=== Area No. 3 ===
The wards of Artane F, Artane G, Artane H, Drumcondra North A, Drumcondra North B, Drumcondra North C, Finglas East A, Finglas East B, Finglas East C, Finglas East D, Finglas East E, Finglas East F, Santry A, and Santry B.

Area No. 3: 5 seats
Party	Candidate	FPv%	Count														
Party	Candidate	FPv%	1	2	3	4	5	6	7	8	9	10	11	12	13	14	15
Community	Hannah Barlow	14.8	2,828	2,841	2,857	2,872	2,892	2,968	3,109	3,063	3,116	3,196					
Labour	Paddy Dunne	11.9	2,261	2,275	2,349	2,360	2,527	2,576	2,589	2,624	2,722	2,835	3,340				
Fianna Fáil	Tim Killeen	11.0	2,097	2,100	2,106	2,110	2,113	2,133	2,373	2,394	2,405	2,414	2,420	2,423	2,462	2,530	2,935
Fine Gael	Paddy Belton	8.9	1,705	1,705	1,712	1,713	1,719	1,725	1,734	1,832	1,859	1,871	1,918	1,942	2,198	2,336	2,405
Fine Gael	Mary Flaherty	8.5	1,621	1,626	1,643	1,654	1,671	1,684	1,695	1,828	1,862	1,889	1,963	2,007	2,588	2,750	2,853
Fianna Fáil	Michael Barrett	8.0	1,523	1,527	1,531	1,537	1,541	1,550	1,642	1,646	1,654	1,663	1,669	1,673	1,698	1,723	2,465
Fianna Fáil	Danny Bell	6.4	1,219	1,220	1,231	1,240	1,247	1,258	1,365	1,367	1,394	1,411	1,427	1,429	1,469	1,490	
Fine Gael	Eddie Nolan	4.0	756	764	780	787	822	828	838	1,029	1,070	1,089	1,136	1,164			
Socialist Labour	Martin Giblin	3.4	641	651	658	667	677	746	750	762	1,027	1,196	1,239	1,296	1,338		
Labour	Robert Dowds	3.4	641	646	673	680	762	781	783	793	836	890					
Socialist Labour	Billy Keegan	2.8	540	579	603	623	658	704	709	715							
Fianna Fáil	Seán Quinn	2.8	539	541	543	555	562	570									
Fine Gael	Jim Munro	2.8	537	539	548	552	564	581	586								
Sinn Féin	Michael MacConmara	2.5	486	491	499	512	519										
Sinn Féin The Workers' Party	Michael Kenny	2.1	403	450	455	670	702	786	793	798	825						
Sinn Féin The Workers' Party	Joseph Oman	1.9	365	393	400												
Labour	Sam Nolan	1.8	350	361	444	478											
Labour	Frank Lynch	1.7	324	337													
Socialist Party	Eamonn O'Farrell	1.2	230														
Electorate: 40,023 Valid: 19,066 Spoilt: 360 Quota: 3,178 Turnout: 48.54%

=== Area No. 4 ===
The wards of Cabra East A, Cabra East B, Drumcondra South C, Finglas West A, Finglas West B, Finglas West C, Glasnevin A, Glasnevin B, and Inns Quay A.

Area No. 4: 4 seats
Party	Candidate	FPv%	Count													
Party	Candidate	FPv%	1	2	3	4	5	6	7	8	9	10	11	12	13	14
Fianna Fáil	Bertie Ahern	18.6	2,710	2,712	2,776	2,790	2,863	2,885	3,105							
Fine Gael	Alice Glenn	12.8	1,868	1,874	1,877	1,882	1,914	1,944	1,960	1,962	1,975	2,011	2,059	2,357	2,645	2,755
Fine Gael	Luke Belton	10.5	1,532	1,537	1,542	1,551	1,574	1,590	1,603	1,608	1,623	1,643	1,689	2,204	2,409	2,514
Labour	Tony Dunne	7.9	1,155	1,201	1,210	1,243	1,270	1,310	1,315	1,316	1,406	1,574	1,605	1,729	1,839	2,205
Fine Gael	Frank Barr	6.9	1,008	1,020	1,027	1,036	1,049	1,060	1,068	1,073	1,105	1,125	1,174			
Independent	Paddy Farrelly	6.9	999	1,003	1,005	1,026	1,080	1,093	1,116	1,126	1,135	1,157	1,213	1,235		
Sinn Féin The Workers' Party	Proinsias De Rossa	6.6	968	988	994	1,059	1,076	1,263	1,271	1,272	1,341	1,376	1,424	1,480	1,558	
Labour	Gerry Maher	6.0	881	895	900	927	945	985	1,004	1,005	1,123	1,490	1,528	1,584	1,688	1,922
Labour	Diana Robertson	4.4	637	642	648	665	675	720	728	729	768					
Fianna Fáil	Patrick Duffy	3.2	462	471	520	531	552	554	689	840	849	870				
Sinn Féin The Workers' Party	Margaret O'Leary	2.8	404	410	415	460	474									
Fianna Fáil	Joe Tierney	2.7	396	396	440	443	481	490								
Independent	Richard Gogan	2.6	380	384	393	402										
Independent	Joe McDonagh	2.4	353	360	369											
Socialist Labour	Mick Larkin	2.4	343	425	430	464	486	519	521	521						
Fianna Fáil	Joseph Greene	1.6	234	238												
Socialist Labour	Frank Clarke	1.6	233													
Electorate: 32,793 Valid: 14,563 Spoilt: 309 Quota: 2,913 Turnout: 45.35%

=== Area No. 5 ===
The wards of Arran Quay A, Arran Quay B, Arran Quay C, Arran Quay D, Arran Quay E, Cabra East C, Cabra West A, Cabra West B, Cabra West C, Cabra West D, Cabra West E, Inns Quay B, Inns Quay C, Phoenix Park, Rotunda A, and Rotunda B.

Area No. 5: 4 seats
Party	Candidate	FPv%	Count												
Party	Candidate	FPv%	1	2	3	4	5	6	7	8	9	10	11	12	13
Labour	Pat Carroll	16.3	2,361	2,372	2,378	2,416	2,452	2,488	2,594	2,634	2,888	2,914			
Independent	Frank Sherwin	12.9	1,867	1,902	1,917	1,987	2,002	2,080	2,207	2,238	2,278	2,329	2,452	2,587	2,766
Labour	Jimmy Somers	11.2	1,624	1,639	1,651	1,658	1,675	1,711	1,834	1,855	2,041	2,055	2,152	2,200	2,248
Fine Gael	Hugh Byrne	10.6	1,538	1,552	1,561	1,595	1,678	1,702	1,718	1,879	1,925	1,945	2,519	2,623	2,717
Fianna Fáil	Tom Leonard	10.6	1,537	1,549	1,680	1,696	1,707	1,788	1,808	1,816	1,844	2,166	2,205	3,345	
Fianna Fáil	Dermot Fitzpatrick	8.4	1,224	1,233	1,265	1,276	1,297	1,380	1,393	1,413	1,429	1,690	1,727		
Fine Gael	Ann-Marie McDonnell	4.8	693	700	704	720	801	815	827	1,064	1,093	1,113			
Fianna Fáil	Fergus Keely	4.5	649	656	687	697	704	757	763	767	776				
Labour	Griff Cashman	3.8	555	559	560	568	599	609	636	645					
Sinn Féin The Workers' Party	Michael White	3.5	502	512	517	526	527	546							
Fine Gael	John Monaghan	3.4	489	492	495	503	545	554	558						
Independent	Richard Gogan	3.0	440	455	464	474	482								
Fine Gael	Colette Carroll	2.4	344	349	353	361									
Independent	Michael Kelly	1.8	266	278	278										
Fianna Fáil	Pat Schweppe	1.8	266	268											
Independent	Noel Geraghty	1.2	172												
Electorate: 32,732 Valid: 14,527 Spoilt: 277 Quota: 2,906 Turnout: 45.22%

=== Area No. 6 ===
The wards of Ballybough A, Ballybough B, Clontarf East D, Clontarf West C, Clontarf West D, Clontarf West E, Drumcondra South A, Drumcondra South B, Mountjoy A, Mountjoy B, North City, North Dock A, North Dock B, and North Dock C.

Area No. 6: 4 seats
Party	Candidate	FPv%	Count															
Party	Candidate	FPv%	1	2	3	4	5	6	7	8	9	10	11	12	13	14	15	16
Fine Gael	Michael Keating	21.3	2,998															
Fianna Fáil	Vincent Brady	15.1	2,135	2,143	2,148	2,157	2,162	2,165	2,173	2,185	2,308	2,332	2,351	2,367	2,400	2,434	2,511	2,562
Community	Tony Gregory	12.3	1,729	1,744	1,763	1,771	1,795	1,807	1,864	1,891	1,901	2,028	2,062	2,094	2,150	2,404	2,495	2,641
Fianna Fáil	Noel Mulcahy	11.8	1,671	1,678	1,687	1,689	1,690	1,696	1,706	1,711	1,862	1,884	1,903	1,916	1,939	2,004	2,034	2,095
Labour	William Cumiskey	5.7	798	808	815	826	838	934	973	984	992	1,034	1,062	1,234	1,265	1,390	1,984	2,246
Labour	Charlotte Baker	4.8	673	678	682	701	702	753	794	803	813	834	852	989	1,023	1,128		
Sinn Féin The Workers' Party	Ray McGran	4.7	665	669	683	684	727	739	783	786	790	826	842	858	866			
Fine Gael	Bill Thompson	3.4	481	516	517	519	520	530	530	602	607	630	720	724				
Fine Gael	Brian Dunne	3.3	460	484	485	490	492	502	511	593	601	614	735	763	1,148	1,168	1,252	
Labour	David Byrne	2.5	352	355	359	383	387	414	445	451	454	473	491					
Fianna Fáil	Rita Ryan	2.5	346	349	354	354	354	358	364	366								
Community	Michael McAnulla	2.3	328	333	340	340	358	365	374	381	389							
Fine Gael	Hugh Grainger	2.1	293	322	325	325	327	333	342	400	409	426						
Fine Gael	Oonagh Egan	2.0	279	301	301	302	303	312	318									
Labour	Jo Walsh	1.8	260	264	266	268	271											
Socialist Labour	Declan Byrne	1.5	213	214	218	275	307	311										
Communist	Seanie Lambe	1.1	149	149	166	167												
Socialist Labour	Des Bonass	1.0	141	142	147													
Independent	George Lynch	0.9	132	133														
Electorate: 30,665 Valid: 14,103 Spoilt: 426 Quota: 2,821 Turnout: 47.38%

=== Area No. 7 ===
The wards of Ballyfermot A, Ballyfermot B, Ballyfermot C, Ballyfermot D, Ballyfermot E, Ballyfermot F, Ballyfermot G, Ballyfermot H, Crumlin A, Crumlin F, Kilmainham A, Kilmainham B, and Kilmainham C.

Area No. 7: 4 seats
Party	Candidate	FPv%	Count																
Party	Candidate	FPv%	1	2	3	4	5	6	7	8	9	10	11	12	13	14	15	16	17
Fine Gael	Jim Mitchell	23.8	3,787																
Fianna Fáil	Eileen Lemass	9.9	1,567	1,608	1,609	1,612	1,620	1,641	1,648	1,660	1,909	1,953	1,989	2,057	2,119	2,183	2,245	2,329	2,585
Fianna Fáil	Lauri Corcoran	8.8	1,405	1,425	1,425	1,428	1,432	1,440	1,448	1,458	1,605	1,657	1,682	1,695	1,715	1,773	1,835	1,882	2,104
Independent	George Butler	7.4	1,180	1,215	1,218	1,223	1,225	1,235	1,243	1,258	1,265	1,293	1,327	1,340	1,382	1,428	1,561	1,639	
Sinn Féin The Workers' Party	Tomás MacGiolla	7.4	1,168	1,200	1,207	1,222	1,282	1,305	1,351	1,368	1,391	1,430	1,463	1,524	1,663	1,771	1,836	1,988	2,211
Labour	Paddy O'Mahony	6.0	946	973	977	1,004	1,021	1,025	1,069	1,174	1,182	1,260	1,284	1,339	1,416	1,526	1,694	2,232	2,459
Labour	Anne McStay	4.9	786	824	827	833	851	883	899	1,011	1,034	1,064	1,110	1,203	1,250	1,424	1,557		
Fine Gael	Bill Brady	4.0	635	764	766	767	769	780	800	809	814	834	1,136	1,160	1,194	1,251			
Independent	Mick O'Mahony	3.5	564	583	584	586	594	598	730	746	752	768	780	799					
Community	Jack Norton	3.5	561	585	593	599	610	633	639	647	667	819	836	1,056	1,095				
Community	Mary Moran	3.4	534	550	553	564	573	579	592	605	611								
Community	Pam O'Reilly	3.4	533	553	556	563	581	594	607	611	625	694	712						
Fianna Fáil	Thomas Dalton	3.3	526	536	539	540	541	563	568	569									
Fine Gael	Paddy Keating	2.6	418	569	572	573	579	598	606	618	643	666							
Independent	Sean Thornton	2.1	340	343	345	350	362	363											
Labour	Margaret Moloney	2.1	334	358	360	372	379	382	392										
Independent	Thomas Byrne	1.4	223	229	230	232	239												
Communist	John Montgomery	1.3	199	205	208	220													
Socialist Labour	Ivor Nolan	0.8	128	133	135														
Independent	James McKenna	0.3	55	58															
Electorate: 35,104 Valid: 15,889 Spoilt: 265 Quota: 3,178 Turnout: 46.0%

=== Area No. 8 ===
The wards of Crumlin B, Crumlin C, Crumlin D, Crumlin E, Kimmage A, Kimmage B, Kimmage C, Kimmage D, Kimmage E, Terenure A, Terenure B, and Terenure C.

=== Area No. 9 ===
The wards of Rathfarnham A, Rathfarnham B, Rathfarnham C, Rathfarnham D, Rathfarnham South, Rathmines East C, Rathmines East D, Rathmines West A, Rathmines West B, Rathmines West C, Rathmines West D, Rathmines West E, and Rathmines West F.

=== Area No. 10 ===
The wards of Mansion House A, Mansion House B, Pembroke East A, Pembroke East B, Pembroke East C, Pembroke East D, Pembroke East E, Pembroke West A, Pembroke West B, Pembroke West C, Rathmines East A, Rathmines East B, and South Dock.

=== Area No. 11 ===
The wards of Merchant's Quay A, Merchant's Quay B, Merchant's Quay C, Merchant's Quay D, Merchant's Quay E, Merchant's Quay F, Royal Exchange A, Royal Exchange B, St. Kevin's, Usher's A, Usher's B, Usher's C, Usher's D, Usher's E, Usher's F, Wood Quay A, and Wood Quay B.

== Sources ==
- Department of the Environment (1980). Local elections, 1979: election results and transfer of votes in respect of each county, and county borough council: and election statistics relating to all local authorities (PDF). Official publications. Vol. Prl.9322. Dublin: Stationery Office. Archived (PDF) from the original on 6 March 2016.
- "1979 Local Elections". ElectionsIreland.org.
- "Dublin City Council: 1979 Local Election". IrelandElection.com.
