= Revolutionary Marxist Group =

Revolutionary Marxist Group may refer to:

- Revolutionary Marxist Group (Canada)
- Revolutionary Marxist Group (Ireland)
