= Socialist Labour Alliance =

The Socialist Labour Alliance was a far left political alliance in Ireland, seen by some of its members as a political party in process of formation. It was initiated in 1970 by the Socialist Labour Action Group (SLAG), composed of members of the Labour Party, including the Young Socialists, campaigning for a more left wing programme.

In 1971 the inaugural conference took place in Dublin. The Alliance included individual members as well as People's Democracy, the Young Socialists, the League for a Workers Republic, and the Waterford Socialist Movement. Individual and affiliated members subsequently took the major part in founding the Socialist Workers' Movement (SWM) and the Revolutionary Marxist Group. The SWM soon disaffiliated on the grounds that it found the Alliance a debating group rather than a campaigning organisation, leaving the remaining groups to dissolve it.
