= Walter Ellis =

Walter Ellis may refer to:

- Walter Ellis (writer), Northern Ireland–born, United States-based writer
- Walter E. Ellis, American serial killer
- Walt Ellis, American football tackle
