= Socialist Workers Network =

Irish political party

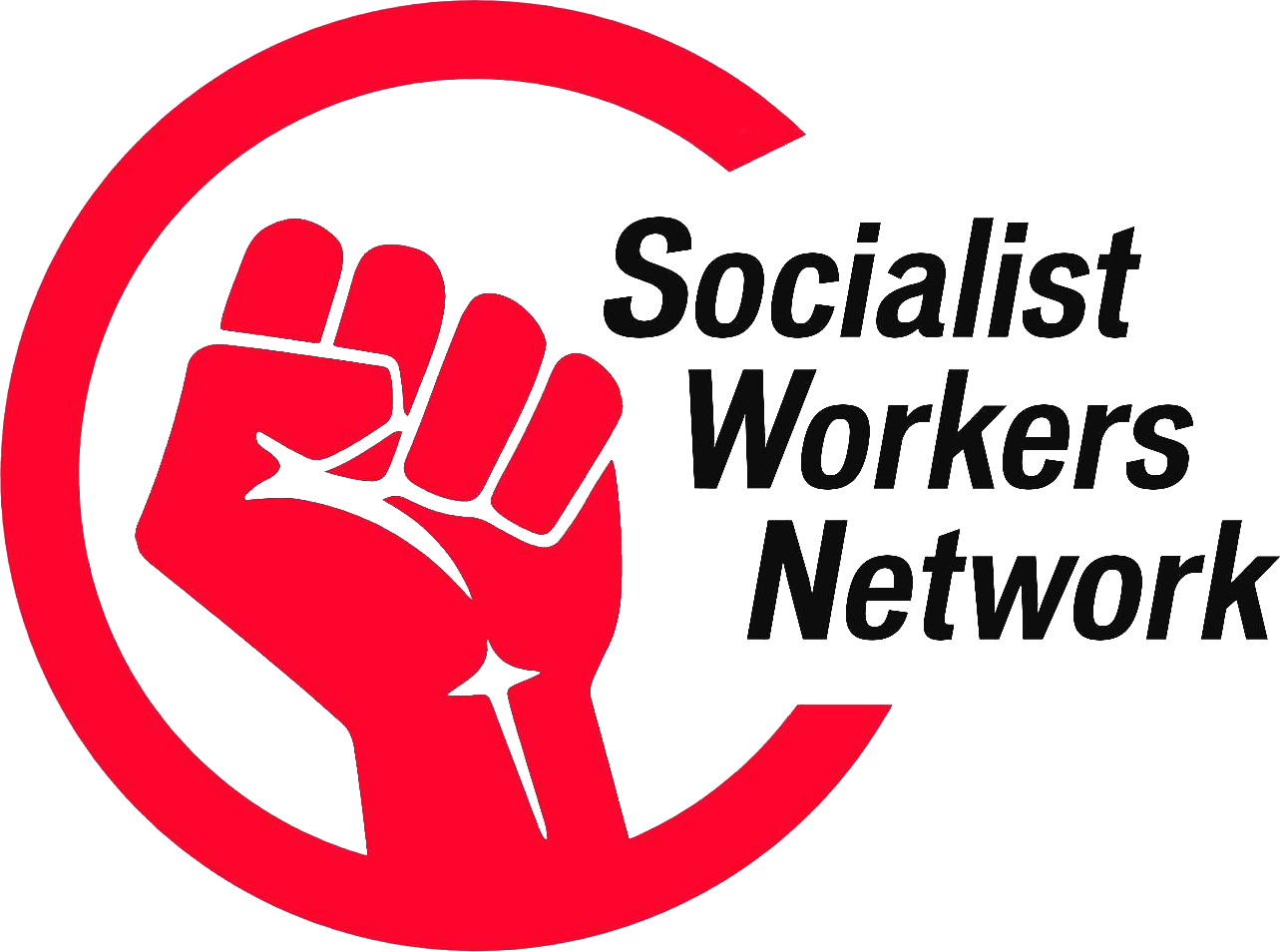
- Leader: Collective leadership (Central Committee)
- Founded: 1971
- Ideology: Revolutionary socialism; Trotskyism; United Ireland
- National affiliation: People Before Profit; People Before Profit–Solidarity; United Left Alliance (pre-2013)
- European affiliation: European Anti-Capitalist Left; European United Left-Nordic Green Left
- International affiliation: International Socialist Tendency
- Colours: Red, black

Website
- socialistworkeronline.net

The Socialist Workers Network (SWN) is an Irish Trotskyist organisation.

It was founded in 1971 as the Socialist Workers Movement (SWM), before becoming the Socialist Workers Party (SWP) in 1995. The SWP was a founding member of People Before Profit and was a member of the European United Left-Nordic Green Left and International Socialist Tendency.

In 2018, the SWP changed its name to Socialist Workers Network.

== History ==
The SWP was founded in 1971 as the Socialist Workers Movement by supporters of the International Socialists of Britain (now called the SWP) living in Ireland, who had previously been members of People's Democracy, the Waterford Socialist Movement and the Young Socialists. Many of the members had been active in the new Socialist Labour Alliance. The SWM subsequently affiliated to the SLA, but soon left, claiming that the Alliance was organised to debate, rather than to campaign.

Some of those who joined the SWM after its formation sympathised with a small tendency in Britain and later split away to form the Irish Workers Group, which later became Workers Power. Meanwhile, the SWM grew on a modest scale and published a paper called The Worker.

In 1975, the SWM narrowly rejected a proposal to merge into the Irish Republican Socialist Party. SWM members helped to organise and publicise public meetings which were addressed by IRSP founder Seamus Costello. In 1976 prior to the establishment of the Socialist Labour Party, and the SWN affiliation to it, they were in negotiations with the Independent Socialist Party (Ireland) a schism from the IRSP about a merger.

When the Socialist Labour Party was founded in 1977, the SWM joined as a 'tendency' (or subgroup). The Socialist Workers Tendency was noted in the SLP for producing a bulletin more professional than that of the party. They left in 1980 to reform the Socialist Workers Movement.

The SWM was long overshadowed on the Irish left by organisations such as the Workers' Party, but the fall of the Berlin Wall and the Warsaw Pact regimes after 1989 saw it grow. Unlike some Irish socialist groups, the SWM supported the revolutions of 1989 against what it saw as state capitalist dictatorships, contending that regimes such as the Soviet Union were not socialist but a form of state capitalism, directed not by corporations but by a Stalinist bureaucracy using the state.

Growing from a small agitation group of about fifty members, the SWM now began to build groups in major colleges such as Trinity College and University College Dublin. Its traditional workplace bastion, Waterford Glass, has faded in strength but the SWP has developed some limited support in the Dublin Bus unions and the education branch of SIPTU. The party campaigned vigorously in referendums for abortion choice and for divorce.

The SWM changed its name to the Socialist Workers Party at its conference in 1995, after delegates from Dublin Bus argued that it should now take itself seriously on the left, as it then had a growing and active membership.

The SWP grew from a mostly Dublin-based membership, where it had two branches, to today's organisation with a number of branches in Dublin as well as branches in some other Irish cities and towns, and also in some colleges and universities. At its 2004 conference it claimed to have five hundred members, although this membership figure was regarded as much exaggerated by many others on the Irish left who have estimated SWP membership at anything between seventy and two hundred. It has not made any public membership claim since 2004.

Since it began to participate in elections, both general (Dáil) and local government, in 1997, it has so far failed to have any of its candidates elected under its own name. So far the party has not run any candidates for the European Parliament or the Seanad.

In the 2004 local elections, it improved on its previous performances by polling relatively strongly in four Dublin wards. These were Artane, Dún Laoghaire, Clondalkin and Ballyfermot, where its candidates won 792 votes (5.65%), 1,439 votes (7.94%), 1,044 votes (7.36%) and 1,094 votes (11.75%) respectively. No seats were won however.

The 2002 general election was the last occasion on which SWP candidates stood under the SWP banner in a general election.

In the 2007 general election, their candidates ran under the banner of People Before Profit. People Before Profit stood five candidates, four of them SWP activists. Their candidate in the Dún Laoghaire constituency, Richard Boyd Barrett, was 2,000 votes short of winning a seat, scoring 8.9% of the first-preference vote.

In the 2009 local elections ten of the thirteen People Before Profit candidates were also SWP members. In 2014 Bríd Smith of the SWP stood for the Dublin constituency in the European Parliament Elections, which was believed to have been a factor in Socialist Party (Ireland) MEP Paul Murphy losing his seat which had been won by Joe Higgins in 2009.

Due to disagreements between the Dublin leadership and the Belfast branch of the SWP on the selection of election candidates, a majority of the Belfast branch broke away at the end of 2009. They formed a group known as the International Socialists which is confined to Belfast.

In the 2011 general election, SWP member and Irish Anti-War Movement chair Richard Boyd Barrett was elected to the Dáil Éireann on behalf of People Before Profit as part of the United Left Alliance. One of its best known members is Eamonn McCann, a journalist from Derry, who was involved in the Northern Ireland Civil Rights Movement in the 1960s. He was present at both the Battle of the Bogside in August 1969 and Bloody Sunday in January 1972, and has campaigned for the families of the fourteen shot dead by the British Paratroop regiment. McCann writes articles for media such as the Belfast Telegraph and Hot Press, and attracted 9,127 votes (1.6%) for the Socialist Environmental Alliance in the Northern Ireland constituency in the 2004 European Parliament election.

In August 2026, a group of 15 prominent People Before Profit members resigned from the Socialist Workers Network while remaining members of PBP. The resignations followed a letter accusing the SWN leadership of a "hegemonic" and "sect-based" culture that marginalised political differences and younger members from decision-making. Those departing include PBP councillor Conor Reddy, national organiser Aislinn Shanahan-Daly, and Dublin organisers Damian Kelly and Farah Parvazi, leaving the SWN with only one active member on PBP's six-person officer board. The dispute reportedly reflects a wider generational and strategic divide within the SWN, amid changing circumstances for PBP since its foundation in 2005. The departures have reportedly made Paul Murphy's Rise network and independent socialist Eddie Conlon the dominant group within PBP. The SWN has acknowledged the frustrations and said that former members had an "open door" to return.

== Publications ==
The best-known SWN publication is the monthly newspaper Socialist Worker. In recent years the paper has sought to change itself from a narrow party publication to a broader, full-colour, anti-capitalist 'paper of the movements', occasionally including contributors from the wider Irish left. Socialist Worker was for a period the most frequently published Marxist newspaper in Ireland, published fortnightly from 1995, and weekly for a brief period in 2003 following the invasion of Iraq. However, in 2005 it was issued only once every three weeks and in 2006 it returned to a monthly schedule.

It has occasionally attempted to launch a magazine dealing with theoretical and political issues in greater detail. One such attempt was called Resistance and lasted for eight issues. A more recently attempt entitled New Left Journal, lasted for two issues.

In 2012, the Irish Marxist Review was launched and since has had regular editions. After its recalibration in 2018, the SWN also launched a new socialist website called Rebel.

== Politics ==
The SWN argues that working class unity can only be built if Protestants turn their back on loyalist ideas, and Catholic workers reject the idea of a "pan-nationalist alliance" in Northern Ireland.

However, in earlier years they tended to take a more Republican line on The Troubles, for example arguing in 1985 that "Protestant workers can be compared to the poor whites of the Southern states of the US. Their cheap labour goes hand in hand with their racism." (Socialist Worker, No. 21, December 1985). It was supportive of the turn towards socialism by Sinn Féin during the late 1970s and 1980s, and considered merging into the Irish Republican Socialist Party in 1975. The SWM were active in the mass movements opposing the criminalisation of IRA prisoners in the early 1980s, and members of the SWM were active in local Anti-H Block committees (Dundalk member Phil Toale, a shop steward in the town's cigarette factory, organised a general strike in the town the day that hunger-striker Bobby Sands died). The SWM took the view that it was the duty of revolutionary socialists to support those opposing British imperialism, but that this would be better done by a mass movement like the Civil Rights Movement than the one thousand or so trained volunteers of the Provisional Irish Republican Army. The SWM used to call for a vote for Sinn Féin in Northern Ireland up until its party conference of 1995, when it was argued that the Adams/McGuinness leadership of Sinn Féin were moving to an accommodation with imperialism. It opposed the subsequent Belfast Agreement, arguing that rather than ending conflict in Northern Ireland, the Agreement was 'institutionalising sectarianism', creating two competing communities and political leaderships, both nationalist and unionist, which did little for working-class people.

Following riots in Dublin on 25 February 2006 by Republicans, protesting at a planned 'Love Ulster' parade, the SWP issued a press release in which it expressed its full support for the actions of the rioters. According to the press release, given the wider context of (apparent) working-class alienation at the hands of the capitalist political establishment, the riots were completely justified: "socialists do not join in the condemnation of young working class people who riot against the police - especially given this wider context." Also, the SWP claimed that the 'Love Ulster' march was purposely planned by Michael McDowell, the Minister for Justice, as a provocation to republicans to riot, and thus further blacken the Republican movement, of whom the Minister is a most vocal critic.

The SWN is organised on both sides of the border. In Northern Ireland it initially operated as part of the Socialist Environmental Alliance (SEA) in elections. The SWP was the only organised grouping within the SEA. The group was dissolved in 2008 with most of it folding into People Before Profit.

The SWN is part of the International Socialist Tendency grouping.
