= Raytheon 9 =

Group of anti-war activists in Northern Ireland

The Raytheon 9 were a group of anti-war activists from the Derry Anti-War Coalition who caused considerable damage to the Raytheon factory in Derry, Northern Ireland. The nine are: Colm Bryce, Gary Donnelly, Kieran Gallagher, Michael Gallagher, Sean Heaton, Jimmy Kelly, Eamonn McCann, Paddy McDaid and Eamonn O'Donnell.

Acting upon information that Raytheon missiles were being used in Israel's invasion of Lebanon, and moreover that these missiles were being created at the Raytheon factory in Derry, these nine activists forced entry into the Raytheon offices in Derry on 9 August 2006. They destroyed the computers, documents, and the server of the office, and proceeded to occupy it for eight hours prior to their arrest. Raytheon itself has not issued a press release on the actions of the Raytheon 9. When Raytheon staff returned to the offices they claimed that some of their desks had been urinated on and also had human excrement smeared on them.

== Local criticism ==
The city's SDLP Member of Parliament, Mark Durkan, said the protesters were jeopardizing future US foreign direct investment.

People are rightly free to voice their disgust at the violence in the Middle East and the failure of Britain and America to challenge or contain Israeli actions. People are also free to express opposition to the arms trade and the role of a company like Raytheon at a global level within that, but destroying property and possibly prejudicing other investment and employment prospects is not the way to register such concerns. — Mark Durkan, MP

== Trial ==
The activists were charged with criminal damage and affray. The trial of six of the accused began 19 May 2008, in the Laganside Courts in Belfast. McCann was found guilty of the theft of two computer discs and acquitted of all other charges, and the other five were acquitted of all charges.
