= Literary and Scientific Society (Queen's University Belfast) =

The Literary and Scientific Society of the Queen's University of Belfast
- Institution: Queen's University of Belfast
- Location: Belfast, Northern Ireland
- Established: 1850; 2011
- Abolished: 1967
- President: Beth Lynam
- Treasurer: Rosa Ivory
- Secretary: Elliot Dickie
- Website: literific.org

The Literary and Scientific Society of the Queen's University of Belfast, commonly known as the Literific, is the university's debating society. The purposes of the Society, as per its Laws are to "encourage debating, oratory and rhetoric throughout the student body of the University and beyond". Being founded in 1850, the society is the oldest society at Queen's University.

== History ==
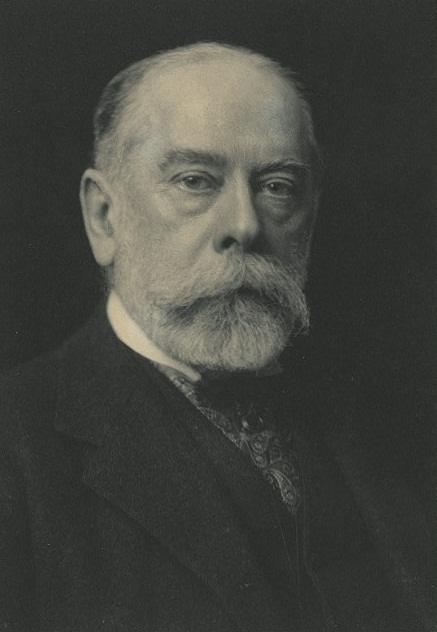
The first president of the society Edwin Lawrence Godkin

=== Prior to adjournment ===
The Society was founded in 1850 as a paper-reading society for students of the new Queen's College, with its first president being Edwin Lawrence Godkin. The Literific was also used, during its early years, as a democratic body which could negotiate with the College on behalf of the students until the formation of the Students' Union Society and the Students' Representative Council in 1900.

The Society established itself as the principal debating body of the University, however in the 1960s the Literific came under fire and was banned for several weeks in 1964 "in view of the disorders and improprieties of conduct and obscene language". The Literific would become dormant in 1967, before being formally dissolved by the Queen's University Belfast Students' Union in 1969.

=== Union Debating Society ===
The Union Debating Society was founded in 1968 following the adjournment of the Literific. The Union Debating Society replaced the Literific as the university debating society. People's Democracy would be formed following a meeting of the Union Debating Society in 1968.

The Union Debating Society had practically disappeared, in 2007 the Debating and Mooting Society would be formed replacing the Union Debating Society. By 2011 interest in the Literific reached the Debating and Mooting Society and the society particularly it's Vice-President Paul Shannon would be reformed in 2011.

=== Post-adjournment ===
Following the revival of the Literific, Paul Shannon would be elected as the society's first president in over 40 years, the Literific would vote to award him the title of "Eternal Leader" in 2012 .

Currently the Society operates as the sole debating society at Queen's University Belfast and has an affiliation with the Queen's University Belfast Students' Union as well as to the University itself. The Society holds weekly meetings on a particular motion of interest during term.

In addition to regular meetings, the Society conducts the Godkin and Dufferin competitions in the first and second academic semesters of a given year. The most recent winner of the Dufferin and Godkin competitions is Ashyka Chan Kaur, to date the only person to have won both competitions since the re-establishment of the society.

The society conducts an annual "Literific School's Debating Competition" as an outreach programme to secondary schools across Northern Ireland where a number of schools typically send teams to compete in Queen's with a final being organized in the Senate chambers in Stormont.

==== Irish Times ====
In 2018 the Literific, supported by the QUB Law Society, hosted the 58th Grand Final of the Irish Times Debate at which the Training Officer of the 170th session spoke as an individual finalist. The Event saw 12 speakers discuss the motion: “This House Believes That Ireland Has Failed Its Youth”. The debate was chaired by Lord Justice Stephens and judged by Irish Times editor Paul O’Neill, Queen’s Professor Adrienne Scullion, Pro Vice-Chancellor for Arts, Humanities and Social Sciences; Margaret Elliott who is a governor of the Irish Times Trust and Professor Brent Northup, the chair of communications at Carroll College in Montana.

In 2025 the Literific again hosted the Grand Final of the Irish Times Debate, on the motion "This House Believes that dialogue is dead." The debate was chaired by Northern Ireland’s chief justice, Mrs Justice Siobhán Keegan, and the judging panel included Irish Times editor Ruadhán Mac Cormaic; pro-vice chancellor for engineering and physical sciences at Queen’s University Belfast, Professor Geert Dewulf; two former team winners of the competition from 2015 and 2024, and Professor Brent Northup once again.

==== LitTalks and Great Debates ====
In 2020, the Literific launched two new series called LitTalks and Great Debates. The first LitTalk took place in February 2020 with James Brokenshire, then Minister of State for Security and former Secretary of State for Northern Ireland. Other LitTalks have included Theresa May, Mary McAleese, Mary Lou McDonald, Ian Blackford, Naomi Long and Doug Beattie.

In November 2020, the first Great Debate was held on the motion: This House Regrets the Decriminalisation of Abortion in Northern Ireland. The debate attracted much controversy on social media, particularly due to the inclusion of former Shadow Home Secretary Ann Widdecombe on the proposition. The motion was defeated by 472 votes to 159.

== Presidents ==
=== List of presidents (1850-1967) ===
Presidents prior to the society's adjournment
| Session | Name | Notes |
|---|---|---|
| 1st (1850–51) | Mr. Edwin L. Godkin | |
| 2nd (1851–52) | Mr. Robert Taylor | |
| 3rd (1852–53) | Mr. Charles B. Hancock | |
| 4th (1853–54) | Mr. Robert Dunlop | |
| 5th (1854–55) | Mr. John Clarke | |
| 6th (1855–56) | Mr. James Gardner Robb | |
| 7th (1856–57) | Mr. John McParland | |
| 8th (1857–58) | Mr. William MacCormac | |
| 9th (1858–59) | Mr. William Pirrie Sinclair | |
| 10th (1859–60) | Mr. Hugh Hyndman | |
| 11th (1860–61) | Mr. Thomas Sinclair | |
| 12th (1861–62) | Mr. Alexander Hamilton | |
| 13th (1862–63) | Mr. John McKane | |
| 14th (1863–64) | Mr. John Park | |
| 15th (1864–65) | Mr. Samuel James Mcmullan | |
| 16th (1865–66) | Mr. Thomas G. Houston | |
| 17th (1866–67) | Mr. James Brown Dougherty | |
| 18th (1867–68) | Mr. Robert McCrea Chambers | |
| 19th (1868–69) | Mr. Hans McMordie | |
| 20th (1869–70) | Mr. James Monteath | |
| 21st (1870–71) | Mr. James Cowan | |
| 22nd (1871–72) | Mr. R. J. McMordie | |
| 23rd (1872–73) | Mr. Robert Henderson Todd | |
| 24th (1873–74) | Mr. William Wallace Brown | |
| 25th (1874–75) | Mr. John C. Clarke | |
| 26th (1875–76) | Mr. Thomas Greer | |
| 27th (1876–77) | Mr. Hugh A. Clarke | |
| 28th (1877–78) | Mr. John Howard Murphy | |
| 29th (1878–79) | Dr. James Young | |
| 30th (1879–80) | Mr. James A. Lindsay | |
| 31st (1880–81) | Mr. James D. Osborne | |
| 32nd (1881–82) | Mr. Henry A. Mathers | |
| 33rd (1882–83) | Mr. John Joseph Redfern | |
| 34th (1883–84) | Mr. Thomas Harrison | |
| 35th (1884–85) | Dr. William N. Watts | |
| 36th (1885–86) | Mr. George L. Moore | Resigned in protest over merger with the Debating Society. |
| 36th (1885–86) | Mr. Robert F. Dill | |
| 37th (1886–87) | Mr. William H. FitzHenry | Elected President on 23 March 1886. |
| 37th (1886–87) | Mr. William Russell | Elected at special meeting on 6 April 1886. |
| 38th (1887–88) | Mr. James B. Armstrong | |
| 39th (1888–89) | Mr. Robert T. Martin | |
| 40th (1889–90) | Mr. James Hamill | |
| 41st (1890–91) | Mr. Robert D. Megaw | |
| 42nd (1891–92) | Mr. William John McCracken | |
| 43rd (1892–93) | Mr. James Sinclair Baxter | |
| 44th (1893–94) | Mr. Thomas C. Houston | |
| 45th (1894–95) | Mr. William B. Morton | |
| 46th (1895–96) | Mr. Richard H. Ashmore | |
| 47th (1896–97) | Mr. Henry Hanna | |
| 48th (1897–98) | Mr. John W.D. Megaw | |
| 49th (1898–99) | Mr. George R. Reid | |
| 50th (1899-1900) | Mr. Samuel Clarke Porter | |
| 51st (1900–01) | Mr. Robert Knox McElderry | |
| 52nd (1901–02) | Mr. Archibald McKinstry | |
| 53rd (1902–03) | Mr. William Hawthorne | |
| 54th (1903–04) | Mr. Robert Henry Leighton | |
| 55th (1904–05) | Mr. William Hamilton Davey | |
| 56th (1905–06) | Mr. Thomas M. Johnstone | |
| 57th (1906–07) | Mr. Andrew A. Rutherford | |
| 58th (1907–08) | Mr. John Corry Arnold | |
| 59th (1908–09) | Mr. Robert C. Fergusson | |
| 60th (1909–10) | Mr. John M. Hamill | |
| 61st (1910–11) | Mr. Robert M. McNeill | |
| 62nd (1911–12) | Mr. Stanley W. Thompson | |
| 63rd (1912–13) | Mr. Stanley W. Thompson | |
| 64th (1913–14) | Mr. Herbert Turner | |
| 65th (1914–15) | Miss Muriel Campbell | |
| 66th (1915–16) | Mr. James C. Breakey | |
| 67th (1916–17) | Mr. Samuel G. McConnell | |
| 68th (1917–18) | Mr. David H. O'Neill | |
| 69th (1918–19) | Miss Marion C. Alexander | |
| 70th (1919–20) | Miss Amy I. Woods | |
| 71st (1920–21) | Mr. James Beattie | |
| 72nd (1921–22) | Mr. John Cowser | |
| 73rd (1922–23) | Mr. William Hugh Semple | |
| 74th (1923–24) | Miss Anna B. Morton | |
| 75th (1924–25) | Mr. Hugh Gault Calwell | |
| 76th (1925–26) | Mr. Hugh Gault Calwell | Resigned after the second meeting of the new session. |
| 76th (1925–26) | Mr. Arnold Earls | Elected President by 13 November 1925. |
| 77th (1926–27) | Mr. George Boyle Hanna | |
| 78th (1927–28) | Mr. Michael Aloysius MacConaill | |
| 79th (1928–29) | Mr. James A. Smiley | |
| 80th (1929–30) | Mr. James O. Bartley | |
| 81st (1930–31) | Mr. John Boyd | |
| 82nd (1931–32) | Mr. Walter Shanks | |
| 83rd (1932–33) | Mr. Moir Wilson | |
| 84th (1933–34) | Mr. William James Kinnear Millar | |
| 85th (1934–35) | Mr. Bradley McCall | |
| 86th (1935–36) | Mr. Edwin James | |
| 87th (1936–37) | Mr. Norman S. S. Barnett | |
| 88th (1937–38) | Mr. Ernest Maxwell | |
| 89th (1938–39) | Mr. David W. Wilson | |
| 90th (1939–40) | Mr. Thomas Cusack | |
| 91st (1940–41) | Mr. Gee | President and Secretary called up for military service necessitating a new President. |
| 91st (1940–41) | Mr. Nayan Borooah | |
| 92nd (1941–42) | Mr. James Scott | |
| 93rd (1942–43) | Mr. John Gallen | |
| 94th (1943–44) | Mr. Henry Mackle | |
| 95th (1944–45) | Mr. William Mulligan | |
| 96th (1945–46) | Mr. Francis Boyle | |
| 96th (1945–46) | Mr. Thomas Leslie Teevan | Elected President at meeting on 30 January 1946. |
| 97th (1946–47) | Miss Sheelagh Murnaghan | |
| 98th (1947–48) | Mr. John Midgley | |
| 99th (1948–49) | Mr. Oliver McKeag | |
| 100th (1949–50) | Mr. Brian Baird | |
| 101st (1950–51) | Miss Jill Anderson | |
| 102nd (1951–52) | Mr. Leonard A. Rees | |
| 103rd (1952–53) | Mr. Graham Landon | |
| 104th (1953–54) | Mr. Michael Lavery | |
| 105th (1954–55) | Mr. Michael J. Bradley | Resigned part way through term. |
| 105th (1954–55) | Mr. John Gates | Former Vice President of the society. |
| 106th (1955–56) | Mr. Samuel J. Watt | |
| 107th (1956–57) | Mr. Julian Russell | |
| 108th (1957–58) | Mr. James McKenna | |
| 109th (1958–59) | Mr. John W. Wilson | |
| 110th (1959–60) | Mr. Raymond I. Skilling | |
| 111th (1960–61) | Mr. Bernard Kavanagh | |
| 112th (1961–62) | Mr. John Murtagh | |
| 113th (1962–63) | Mr. Michael Bowes Egan | |
| 114th (1963–64) | Mr. John Duffy | |
| 115th (1964–65) | Mr. Eamonn McCann | |
| 116th (1965–66) | Mr. Cyril Toman | |
| 117th (1966–67) | Mr. Vivian Gill | |

=== List of presidents (2011-present) ===
Presidents since the Literific's re-founding
| Session | Name | Notes |
|---|---|---|
| 163rd (2011–12) | Mr. Paul Shannon | Granted title of "Eternal Leader" in 2012. |
| 164th (2012–13) | Mr. Andrew Carruthers | |
| 165th (2013–14) | Mr. Adam Kydd | |
| 166th (2014–15) | Ms. Naomh Gibson | |
| 166th (2014–15) | Ms. Tara Pouryahya | Elected President at an extraordinary general meeting in November 2014. |
| 167th (2015–16) | Ms. Marie-Louise Synnott | |
| 168th (2016–17) | Mr. Benjamin Murphy | |
| 169th (2017–18) | Mr. Calvin Black | |
| 170th (2018–19) | Mr. Hugh Dobbin | |
| 171st (2019–20) | Mr. Matthew Bradley | |
| 172nd (2020–21) | Mr. Matthew Leigh | |
| 173rd (2021–22) | Mr. Matthew Leigh | |
| 173rd (2021–22) | Mr. Daniel McCormick | Elected President at an extraordinary general meeting in January 2022. |
| 174th (2022–23) | Mr. Matthew Taylor | Resigned as President in January 2023. Secretary Mr. James Orchin served as acting President prior to new elections. |
| 174th (2022–23) | Ms. Tailte McSparron | Elected President at an extraordinary general meeting in February 2023. |
| 175th (2023–24) | Ms. Tailte McSparron | Resigned as President part way through new session. |
| 175th (2023–24) | Mr. Daniel Toft | Elected President at an extraordinary general meeting in January 2024 |
| 176th (2024–25) | Ms. Ella Griffth | |
| 176th (2024–25) | Mr. Dermot Hamill | Elected President at an extraordinary general meeting in October 2024. |
| 177th (2025–26) | Mr. Daniel Devenney | |
| 178th (2026–27) | Ms. Beth Lynam | |

== Current council ==
The Council is the highest-decision making body of the society and has ten members. From within the Council, the President, Secretary and Treasurer compose the Executive. The Council is elected annually at the society's annual general meeting, with the exception of the Technology Officer who is appointed by two thirds of council and is confirmed by society members at the next ordinary meeting. Council serves for a term of one year beginning in June coinciding for the society's sessions.

The Council of the 178th Session of the Literary and Scientific Society
| Position | Name | Notes |
|---|---|---|
| President | Beth Lynam | Treasurer (177th session). |
| Vice-President | Elizabeth Noble | Elected at an extraordinary general meeting in April 2026. |
| Secretary | Elliot Dickie | |
| Treasurer | Rosa Ivory | |
| Internal Convenor | Ella McMullin | Internal Convenor (177th session). |
| External Convenor | Vacant | Previous External Convenor resigned in November 2026. |
| Schools Convenor | Emily Carter | |
| Events Officer | Derry Flanagan | Elected at an extraordinary general meeting in April 2026. |
| Social Officer | Eoin O'Neill | |
| Technology Officer | Michael Herron | |

== Notable people ==
- Edwin Lawrence Godkin - First president of the Society, later editor of The Nation and the New York Evening Post.
- R. J. McMordie - President 1871-72, barrister, M.P. and Lord Mayor of Belfast.
- Thomas Teevan - President of the Society, barrister and Ulster Unionist West Belfast MP - Youngest Chairman of a local Authority in Northern Ireland at 21 (Limavady Urban Council). He was also President of the Queen's Law Society and Chairman of the Unionist Association.
- Sheelagh Murnaghan - President 1946-47, barrister and Ireland Women's hockey player, later Northern Ireland M.P. for the Ulster Liberal Party.
- Eamonn McCann - President 1964-65, writer and political activist. Only individual Q.U.B. winner of the Irish Times Debate.
- Cyril Toman - President 1965-66, Northern Irish political activist.

== See also ==
- Queen's University Belfast Students' Union
- Literary and Historical Society (University College Dublin)
- College Historical Society
- University Philosophical Society
- UCC Philosophical Society
