= Irish Workers' Group =

See Irish Workers' Group (1976) for the Irish Workers' Group which was a member of the League for a Fifth International.

The Irish Workers' Group (IWG) was a Marxist political party in Ireland. It originated as the Irish Workers Union, which later called itself the Irish Communist Group, and contained a variety of people who all considered themselves to be Marxists. Some were from an Irish Republican background, and some, including Gerry Lawless, also became involved in Saor Éire.

In time the group developed distinct Trotskyist and Maoist wings. The latter broke away to form the Irish Communist Organisation, which evolved into the British and Irish Communist Organisation. The former became the Irish Workers' Group, set up by Lawless. The IWG produced a paper Irish Militant and a theoretical journal An Solas/Workers' Republic.

By 1967 the IWG, then based in London among exiled political activists, was failing and handed over their journal to Sean Matgamna and Rachel Lever who were about to launch Workers Fight. A section with support in Ireland then formed the League for a Workers Republic which entered discussions with the Socialist Labour League, British affiliate of the International Committee of the Fourth International.

Other members of the IWG later influential in the Irish far-left were Eamonn McCann, a leader of the Socialist Workers Party, and Michael Farrell, a leader of the now defunct People's Democracy. This group seems to have ceased to exist in the late 1960s.

A later Irish Workers' Group was an organisation that split from the Socialist Workers Movement in 1976. It maintained links with the British Workers Power group and the League for a Fifth International.
