= Michael MacConaill =

Irish medical doctor, anatomist, author and activist

Michael Aloysius MacConaill, MRIA, FLS (27 July 1902, Ballymena, County Antrim – 28 January 1987) was an Irish medical doctor, anatomist, author, and activist.

Born Michael Aloysius McConnell, the eldest of five children, MacConaill's father Michael was a merchant and his mother Lucie (née Gallagher) was a mezzo-soprano.

He was educated at St Mary's Christian Brothers' Grammar School, in Belfast, by the Irish Christian Brothers. In 1919 he entered Queen's University Belfast's Medical School, and completed his BSc in the Anatomy Honours School in 1922.

In 1929 he earned an MSc degree, also from QUB. He was awarded the Queen's University Travelling Medical Studentship for 1929–30 to University College, London. He was a lecturer in Anatomy in the Anatomy Department at Sheffield University, and in 1942 he was named Chair of Anatomy at University College Cork (UCC).

MacConaill's activities in the Irish War of Independence, described as "First Aid Instructor and Organiser of Medical Services, Belfast Brigade III Northern Division 1919-1921" are recorded in his Witness Statement to the Bureau of Military History in 1951.

== Affiliations, publications ==
He was elected a Member of the Royal Irish Academy in 1945. He completed a DSc at Queen's University Belfast in 1950, and an MA by the National University of Ireland in 1964.

He published a great number of scientific articles and invited book chapters, and co-authored two highly regarded books: Synovial Joints: Their Structure and Mechanics and Muscles and Movements: A Basis for Human Kinesiology. He was asked to contribute the chapter on human joints to the 15th Edition of the Encyclopædia Britannica.

A linguist, he had a comprehensive and detailed knowledge of at least eight languages, all of which he spoke fluently, including Irish.

During his time at Queen's University Belfast, he served as the 78th President of the Literary and Scientific Society (Queen's University Belfast).

He was active in the Irish Red Cross, and Commandant of the First Field Ambulance Company of the local defence force in Cork. Following a devastating outbreak of polio during the 1950s, he co-founded the Cork Polio and General After-Care Association.

== Death ==
He retired from his position of Professor of Anatomy in 1972 and died on 28 January 1987.

== Legacy ==
His family established and endowed UCC's The MacConaill Prize.

== Sources ==
- Prendergast, P.J. & T.C. Lee, Walking on water: The biomechanics of Michael A. MacConaill (1902-1987), Irish Journal of Medical Science Vol 175, No. 3
- In Memoriam M.A. MacConaill by J.P. Fraher J. Anat. (1987), pp. 155, 209–11.
- Irish genealogy church record: births
- Professor Mac Connell University College Cork: additional information
