= Ronald Bunting =

Northern Irish politician and British Army officer (1924–1984)

Ronald Bunting circa 1960s

Major Ronald Terence Bunting (1 January 1924 – 28 June 1984) was a British Army officer and unionist political figure in Northern Ireland.

Bunting was commissioned into the Armagh and Down Army Cadet Force in May 1946 and resigned in March 1950 when he transferred to the Royal Electrical and Mechanical Engineers as a lieutenant. He was promoted to captain in 1952 and retired with the honorary rank of major in 1960. After leaving the army he worked as a mathematics lecturer in the Belfast College of Technology.

Bunting's first involvement with politics was as election agent to Republican Labour Party MP Gerry Fitt, although he broke from Fitt and became a close associate of Ian Paisley, playing a leading role in Paisley's campaigns against the Northern Ireland Civil Rights Association, as well as running unsuccessfully for the Protestant Unionist Party in the Northern Ireland general election of 1969 in Belfast Victoria.

Bunting had his own Ulster loyalist strong-arm group which he dubbed the Loyal Citizens of Ulster. The LCU, which existed between 1968 and 1969, was little more than another name for the East Belfast arm of the Ulster Protestant Volunteers.

As head of this group, Bunting led the protests against many civil rights marches, most notably the 1969 Belfast to Derry civil rights march organised by People's Democracy, which resulted in a particularly bloody confrontation at Burntollet. In a fiery court case in 1969, Bunting was sentenced to three months' imprisonment along with Paisley for his role in the disturbances.

Bunting's son Ronnie would go on to serve as a member of the Official Irish Republican Army and the Irish National Liberation Army before he was shot dead by the Ulster Defence Association (UDA) in 1980. Following his son's death, Major Bunting took no further role in politics but later told an inquest he felt his son was killed because of his belief in social justice.
