= Eilis McDermott =

Northern Irish barrister

Eilis McDermott KC
- Born: 1950 (age 75–76); Derry, Northern Ireland
- Education: Queen's University Belfast
- Occupation: Barrister
- Known for: Representing Patrick Doherty in the Bloody Sunday inquiry, and legal defence for Liam Adams
- Political party: People's Democracy
- Other political affiliations: Black Panther Party (Honorary)

Eilis McDermott is a Northern Ireland barrister who was the first woman to become Queen's Counsel (QC).

== Background ==
McDermott was born in Derry, Northern Ireland, in 1950. In 1968, she was admitted to Queen's University Belfast where she studied law, graduating in 1972. While she was a student she became an early member of People's Democracy. On a visit to New York City, she was made an honorary member of the Black Panther Party. She was called to the Bar of Northern Ireland in 1974, becoming a criminal law barrister.

== Career ==
McDermott worked on the Bloody Sunday Inquiry, representing the family of Patrick Doherty. She also represented Liam Adams, brother of Gerry Adams, in Public Prosecution Service of Northern Ireland v. Liam Adams. In 2012, McDermott was the highest-paid barrister in Northern Ireland, earning between £770,035 and £900,000.

== Personal life ==
McDermott lives in Belfast and has three children. She was formerly married to Oliver Kelly, a solicitor.
