= League for a Workers' Republic =

- Founded: 1968
- Dissolved: 1990s
- Ideology: Trotskyism
- International affiliation: Organising Committee for the Reconstruction of the Fourth International

The League for a Workers' Republic (LWR) was a Trotskyist organisation in Ireland.

== Foundation ==
It was founded in 1968 by members of the Irish Workers' Group, which was mainly centred on Irish emigrants to Britain and was itself the result of a previous split in the Irish Communist Group between those, such as Brendan Clifford, who leaned towards Maoism and went on to form the Irish Communist Organisation (ICO), later the British and Irish Communist Organisation (BICO), and those such as Peter Graham, Sean Matgamna (John O'Mahony) and Gery Lawless who were Trotskyists. The LWR was begun by members unhappy at the low level of activity of that organisation in Ireland and the fact that the IWG leaders were based in London.

== Leading members ==
Liam Daltun was a prime mover in its formation but died soon after. Sean Matgamna supported the move but quickly left to pursue interests in British politics with Workers' Fight. Peter Graham (not the Scottish musician) was a young Dubliner who lived between London and Dublin in the late 1960s and early 1970s and was loosely linked to the International Marxist Group. He had a relationship with members of Saor Éire, a republican splinter group in Dublin, and was influential until his murder at a young age by a rival internal faction within the group. Paddy Healy, who briefly worked in London but who was based in Dublin and later became president of the Teachers' Union of Ireland, was a founding member. Carol Coulter, a member of the Irish Young Socialists, student activist and later writer and journalist joined soon after, along with Basil Miller, a student leader in UCD in the 1968 period. A number of younger members, some of whom had been active in the Young Socialists (a broader grouping in Ireland, which also included supporters of International Socialist Tendency and the left wing of the Irish Labour Party), also joined.

== Splits ==
There were later splits, centred as much on international affiliation as Irish issues. The Socialist Labour League in Britain had a number of (mainly Protestant) members in Belfast during the 1960s and was seeking a base in the Republic of Ireland. Cliff Slaughter was sent to Dublin to discuss with an LWR minority, which included Jim Monaghan (who later became a USec Reunified Fourth International supporter) and Dermot Whelan (later to rejoin the LWR and then Sinn Féin). Slaughter won the support of this faction for Gerry Healy and the ICFI (International Committee of the Fourth International). They then split and together with Dave Fry and others formed the League for a Workers Vanguard.

Gery Lawless, Tariq Ali and others in the British International Marxist Group with an Irish connection had stayed in contact with members of the Young Socialists and one or two members of the LWR and in late 1971-early 1972 a group split to form the Revolutionary Marxist Group (Ireland) (later Movement for a Socialist Republic), affiliated to the United Secretariat of the Fourth International. Young Socialist members Betty Purcell and Ann Speed (later a SIPTU trade union official and member of Sinn Féin) were prominent in this grouping.

== International affiliation ==
Those left oriented to the Organising Committee for the Reconstruction of the Fourth International, joining it in 1972, just after it had split with Gerry Healy and the International Committee of the Fourth International. Members of the LWR had joined the Socialist Labour Alliance on its formation in 1971. The LWR had an independent existence from 1972, publishing Workers' Republic magazine, but some supporters worked in the Irish Labour Party. Paddy Healy had been a member of the Administrative Council (national executive) of the Labour Party until being removed. In the middle 1970s the LWR (along with three other Trotskyist groupings) participated in the Socialist Labour Party, led by Matt Merrigan and Noël Browne, which split from the Irish Labour Party and lasted a few years. A few members, such as Harry Vince and John Daly, remained active in the Labour Party. LWR members were active in the giant tax marches of the late 1970s, the 1981 Hunger Strike movements (Paddy Healy ran for the Dáil (lower house of the Irish parliament) in Dublin on an Anti H-Block ticket) and the social movements of the early to mid-1980s, such as the referendum on divorce. The LWR also worked in Ireland in support of Eastern European oppositionists, including Solidarność (Daly was secretary of the Irish Polish Solidarity Committee), and trade unionists in Latin America and South Africa.

== Dissolution ==
The LWR further divided after Carol Coulter, Harry Vince and John Daly left in 1988, Alex White having done so some years previously. They joined with others from a non-Trotskyist background to publish The Irish Reporter journal from 1990 to 2001. Paddy Healy and his brother Séamus Healy (currently a TD for Tipperary) continued with a looser grouping, which had discussions with Stephane Just, but this disappeared by the 1990s.

Although the LWR ceased to exist in the early 1990s, it was never formally dissolved. Séamus Healy still leads a grouping, the Workers and Unemployed Action Group, in the South Tipperary area, although some members did join the Irish Labour Party (one ex-member of the Seamus Healy grouping, Phil Prendergast, was co-opted as Labour Party MEP, but failed to be re-elected). Seamus Healy lost his seat in the Dáil in the 2007 election but regained it as part of the United Left Alliance in the 2011 general election. Paddy Healy ran for the Senate as an independent in July 2007 on an education funding and pro-discipline in schools platform, but was not elected. Alex White (politician) was elected to the Irish Senate for the Labour Party in July 2007. White voted with the Labour Party majority who supported coalition with Fine Gael (a party linked to the Christian Democrat grouping in Europe) prior to the 2007 election. His election to the Senate was credited to an electoral pact with Sinn Féin, based on his record of previously opposing censorship of that party when he worked in RTÉ (the Irish national broadcaster), where he was an active trade unionist. White was elected as a Labour Party TD for Dublin South in the 2011 general election, and was appointed as a junior minister in the Department of Health and Children. In 2014 he was appointed Minister for Cummunications, Energy and natural Resources. John Daly worked for a number of overseas development charities and founded Fairtrade labelling in Ireland in 1996. Carol Coulter was legal editor of the Irish Times, from which she retired in 2013, and appears to be politically inactive.

== Bibliography ==
- Documents: The Founding Conference of the Organising Committee for the Reconstruction of the Fourth International.

Dublin: League for a Workers Republic, 1972.

- The Socialist Labour League and Irish Marxism (1959–1973): a disastrous legacy : a historic document

Dermot Whelan. Dublin: League for a Workers Republic, 1973.

- National wages agreements: the case against.

Basil Miller. Dublin: League for a Workers Republic, 1974.

- The Crisis in education

Carol Coulter. Dublin: League for a Workers Republic, 1975

- Proposals for the second phase of H-Block campaign by League for a Worker's Republic.

League for a Workers' Republic. Dublin: League for a Workers Republic, 1979

- The Campaign in France for Political Status.

France: Organisation communiste internationaliste unifiée, and Dublin: League for a Workers' Republic, 1981

- The price of partition : the economic crisis and the fight for Irish unity.

Paddy Healy. League for a Workers Republic, 1983.

- Where is Sinn Féin going?

Dublin: League for a Workers Republic, 1986.
