= Terry Bunting =

Canadian football player

Profile
- Position: Guard

Personal information
- Born: c. 1935 (age 90–91)
- Listed height: 6 ft 2 in (1.88 m)
- Listed weight: 225 lb (102 kg)

Career history
- 1960–1961: Saskatchewan Roughriders

Terry Bunting (born c. 1935) is a retired Canadian football player who played for the Saskatchewan Roughriders.
