= Socialist Labour Party (Ireland) =

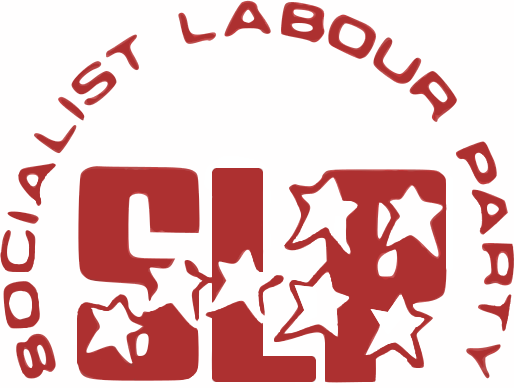
- Leader: Noël Browne; Matt Merrigan
- Founded: 1977
- Dissolved: 1982
- Split from: Labour Party
- Ideology: Democratic socialism
- Political position: Left-wing

The Socialist Labour Party (SLP) was a minor political party in Ireland formed under the leadership of Matt Merrigan (Dublin Secretary of the ATGWU) and Noël Browne, TD in 1977. Another key figure was the radical journalist Brian Trench, former head of the Communications Department at Dublin City University along with the former Clann na Poblachta TD Jack McQuillan. The founders came from the Liaison Committee of the Labour Left, which in 1975/76 had tried to build the "Left Alternative", a coalition of progressive organisations and individuals, aimed at addressing what they saw as the cultural and economic impoverishment of Irish society by the establishment parties of Fianna Fáil and Fine Gael.

The SLP regarded itself as highly progressive. It allowed for the right of factions to organise within the Party. The most notable were the Socialist Workers Tendency, organised around members of the Socialist Workers' Movement which left in 1980, the Workers Alliance for Action organised around members of the Irish Workers' Group which left in 1979 and the Republican Socialist Tendency, organised around members of People's Democracy, which also left in 1979.

In the 1981 general election the party fielded 7 candidates, with Noël Browne elected for Dublin North-Central. Following a continuing decline in membership, the SLP was dissolved in 1982.

== Candidates in the 1981 Irish general election ==
Constituency	Candidate	1st Pref. votes	%	Notes
Dublin North-Central	Noël Browne	5,031	12.4	Elected
Dublin North-East	Michael O'Donoghue	309	0.95	
Dublin North-West	Bill Keegan	209	0.64	
Dublin North-West	Matt Merrigan	473	1.46	
Dublin West	Ivor Nolan	63	0.13	
Dún Laoghaire	Dermot Boucher	575	1.19	
Wexford	John Teehan	447	0.9	
