= Walter Ellis (writer) =

Northern Irish author (born 1948)

Walter Ellis (born 7 September 1948) is a Northern Ireland–born, United States-based writer. He spends his summers in France.

Ellis is the author of The Beginning of the End: The Crippling Disadvantage of a Happy Irish Childhood, the story of his early life in Belfast, Durham, Cork, and Brussels, and his uneasy relationship with his cousin, Ronnie Bunting, a leading member of the Irish National Liberation Army, shot dead in 1980. He also wrote The Oxbridge Conspiracy: How the Ancient Universities Have Kept Their Stranglehold on the Establishment (ISBN 0718137485/ISBN 9780718137489), a study of elitism in higher education in England.

He has lived in New York since 2001. His wife Louisa is a graphic designer and painter. His son, Jamie Ellis, is a record producer.

Ellis, formerly a journalist and foreign correspondent for several British and Irish newspapers, now writes obituaries for The Times of London. He is also moving into the field of fiction. His thriller, The Fleeing Man, was published in Italy in 2010 (as Il Codice Caravaggio) and came out in Ireland in the summer of 2012, achieving excellent reviews.
