= League for the Fifth International =

International grouping of revolutionary Trotskyist organisations

- Abbreviation: L5I
- Founded: Movement for a Revolutionary Communist International (1984)
- Dissolved: December 2025
- Merged into: International Socialist League
- Headquarters: London, United Kingdom
- Membership (2022): 6 affiliated groups c.110 members (2006)

Website
- fifthinternational.org

The League for the Fifth International (L5I) was an international grouping of revolutionary Trotskyist organisations that existed from 1984 until it merged into the International Socialist League in December 2025.

== History ==
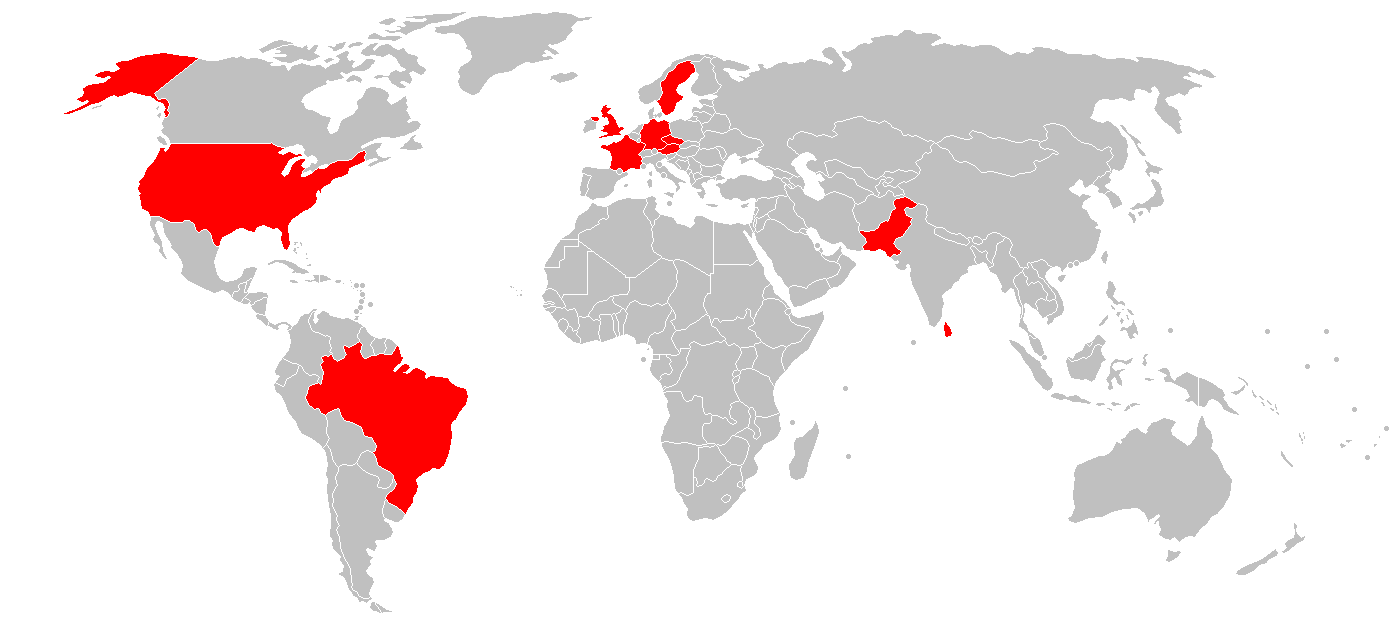

The group was founded in 1984 as the Movement for a Revolutionary Communist International by Workers Power, a faction that was expelled from the International Socialists in 1974/1975. Its first members groups were Workers Power in Britain, the Irish Workers Group, and Gruppe Arbeitermacht (GAM) in Germany. The international was dominated by the British section, Workers Power.

The positions taken by the international were referred to by John Kelly as Radical Trotskyism, which he stated as: "a [Trotskyist] family that shared the commitment of the WRP and others to Orthodoxy but rejected their claims to that title by tracing the roots of ideological degeneration back to 1940." Workers Power and the Irish Workers Group stated that a new, Fifth International needed to be built on its own programme, instead of creating one from the existing political internationals. The group does not recognise the reunified Fourth International, claiming that the original Fourth International was dissolved in 1953.

In 2011, the Revolutionary Communist International Tendency split from the L5I and remained a small group active until at least 2021.

On 19 December 2025, L5I announced it had participated in the Third World Congress of the International Socialist League (LIS) and that they had agreed to join the LIS on the basis of a newly agreed common programme. The former members of the L5I now appear on the list of LIS affiliates, and there have been no articles posted since the announcement.

== Publications ==
The League publishes a quarterly English-language journal entitled Fifth International. The majority of writers for this appear to be from the British group, although other sections publish journals in their own languages. Revolutionärer Marxismus is the German-language journal. The League previously published the journal Permanent Revolution, a more theoretical journal which looked at tactics that communist organisations use, theories of imperialism, and similar questions. This was followed by Trotskyist International which, although still theoretical, also looked more at current affairs.

== Member organisations ==
The L5I listed the following organisations as sections:

Country	Name	Misc.	Ref
Austria	Arbeiter*innenstandpunkt		
Great Britain	Workers Power	Formerly Red Flag. Entered the Labour Party in 2015.	
Germany	Gruppe ArbeiterInnenmacht	Formerly Gruppe Arbeitermacht.	
Pakistan	Revolutionary Socialist Movement		
Sweden	Arbetarmakt		
Switzerland	Marxistische Aktion Schweiz	Formerly Gruppe Was Tun	

As of 2017, the L5I had five affiliated organisations (Austria, Brazil, Germany, Sweden, UK), but claimed to have four additional affiliates.

== See also ==
- List of Trotskyist internationals
- Revolution (political group)
- Fifth International
