= Edward Bunting (cricketer) =

English cricketer

Cricket information
- Batting: Right-handed
- Bowling: Right-arm leg-break and googly

Career statistics
Competition	First-class
Matches	1
Runs scored	1
Batting average	0.50
100s/50s	0/0
Top score	1
Balls bowled	24
Wickets	0
Bowling average	–
5 wickets in innings	–
10 wickets in match	–
Best bowling	–
Catches/stumpings	1/–
- Source: CricInfo, 13 April 2023

Edward Lancelot Bunting (10 December 1883 – 26 February 1962) was an English cricketer who played a single first-class match in 1922, for Worcestershire against Yorkshire.

His brief experience of the first-class game was not successful: Yorkshire, who would go on to the County Championship title, beat their opponents by an innings and 220 runs inside two days. Bunting himself made 1 and 0, with his four overs of leg-spin going for 38 runs, though he took a catch to dismiss George Macaulay.

Bunting was born in Tillington, Staffordshire; he died in Barnwood, Gloucestershire aged 78.
