= Red Republican Party =

Political group in Northern Ireland

The Red Republican Party was a short lived socialist offshoot from the People's Democracy movement.

In the mid-1970s, the experience of the Ulster Workers' Council strike led to PD predicting a loyalist takeover in Northern Ireland, but it later came round to the view that this perspective was incorrect, giving loyalism a degree of autonomy from imperialism which it did not possess. A minority which clung to the old perspective left to form the Left Revolutionary Group, becoming the Red Republican Party in 1976, but was moribund by 1978. This group described the Ulster Loyalist movement as fascist, and it called for stronger support for paramilitary Irish republicanism, and published the journal Heads Up.
