= Saor Éire (1967–1975) =

Irish terrorist organisation

- Leaders: Martin Casey; Joe Dillon; Peter Graham; Frank Keane; Maureen Keegan; Liam Walsh
- Founded: 1967; 59 years ago
- Dissolved: 1975
- Split from: Irish Republican Army
- Active regions: Republic of Ireland
- Ideology: Irish Republicanism; Trotskyism
- Size: "never numbered more than a few dozen activists"
- Wars: The Troubles

Saor Éire (IPA: [ˌsˠeːɾˠ ˈeːɾʲə, ˌsˠiːɾˠ -]; meaning 'Free Ireland'), also known as the Saor Éire Action Group, was an armed Irish republican organisation composed of Trotskyists and ex-IRA members. It took its name from a similar organisation of the 1930s.

== History ==
It was formed in 1967 by ex IRA members who left in protest in the early sixties over lack of military action. Its leaders included Peter Graham, Frank Keane (Former Commandant of the Dublin Brigade of the IRA), Liam Walsh, Joe Dillon and Martin Casey and Maureen Keegan of the Young Socialists. It recruited members of the Marxist Irish Workers Group. The group drew ideological inspiration from Leon Trotsky, Che Guevara, and Socialist Irish Republicans from the 1930s such as Michael Price.

Deaglán de Bréadún of the Irish Times writes that the group "probably never numbered more than a few dozen activists".

Between 1967 and 1970, Saor Éire carried out a number of bank robberies, the proceeds being used to purchase arms. The group provided arms, training and funding to nationalists in Northern Ireland after the outbreak of the Troubles in 1969.

=== Timeline ===
- 27 February 1967: In Drumcondra the group carried out an armed robbery.
- In August 1967: Saor Éire member Frank Keane attempted to burn down the Fianna Fáil party HQ.
- 19 April 1968: Joe Dillon and three others robbed the Royal Bank of Ireland in Drumcondra where £3,186 was stolen.
- 20 June 1968: A Hibernian bank in Newbridge, Kildare was robbed, £3,174 was taken.
- March 1969: A robbery in Newry netted £22,000, the biggest single haul from a robbery in the country at the time.
- February 1970: the group took over the village of Rathdrum in County Wicklow, stopping traffic and cutting phone lines, and robbed the local bank.
- 3 April 1970: In the course of a bank robbery in Dublin, a police officer, Garda Richard Fallon, was shot and killed. He was the first member of the Irish security forces to die in the Troubles. Allegations of government connections with Saor Éire were made in the Dáil (legislature) immediately afterwards and over the following years. Three men, Sean Morrissey, Patrick Francis Keane and Joseph Dillon were tried for the murder and were acquitted. Over thirty years after his death, the family of Garda Fallon accused the government of assisting members of Saor Éire in escaping after the murder. Previously secret government files made available in 2006 confirmed the sighting of Pádraig "Jock" Haughey, brother of the former Taoiseach Charles Haughey, in the company of Martin Casey in London buying arms during the period before the Arms Trial. The government has refused to hold a public inquiry into the matter and possible State collusion with members of the organisation.
- July 1970: the offices of Dalton Supplies in County Wicklow were bombed, there were no casualties or injuries. The group sent a statement to the newspapers saying it was bombed to force the company to accept the proposals of the Labour Court on behalf of the workers.
- 13 October 1970: Liam Walsh died in a premature bomb explosion on a railway embankment in Dublin while Martin Casey was critically injured.
- 25 October 1971: Peter Graham assassinated in Dublin in what was referred to at the time as an internecine dispute about a large sum of money. His killers were never found. Among the mourners at his funeral, along with leading republicans and left-wingers, were Tariq Ali of the International Marxist Group and Charlie Bird, previously a member of the Young Socialists and later a news correspondent for RTÉ television. A photograph of the funeral shows Ali and Bird giving a clenched fist salute at the grave.
- 10 June 1975: Larry White, a leading Saor Éire activist from Cork was shot several times on Mount Eden Road. He died of his injuries a short time later. The Official IRA are widely believed to have been responsible for the killing with a number of members claiming that White had aided the INLA in shooting and injuring Seán Garland in Ballymun in March of that year. In 1976 a number of members of the Official republican movement were convicted of the murder of Larry White, among them Bernard Lynch (the husband of Labour party TD Kathleen Lynch). The case was later quashed on the basis that evidence given at the original trial was no longer admissible.

Saor Éire was officially disbanded in 1975, although it remains a Proscribed Organisation in the United Kingdom under the Terrorism Act 2000.
