= Bunting (horse) =

Swedish horse that appeared in films

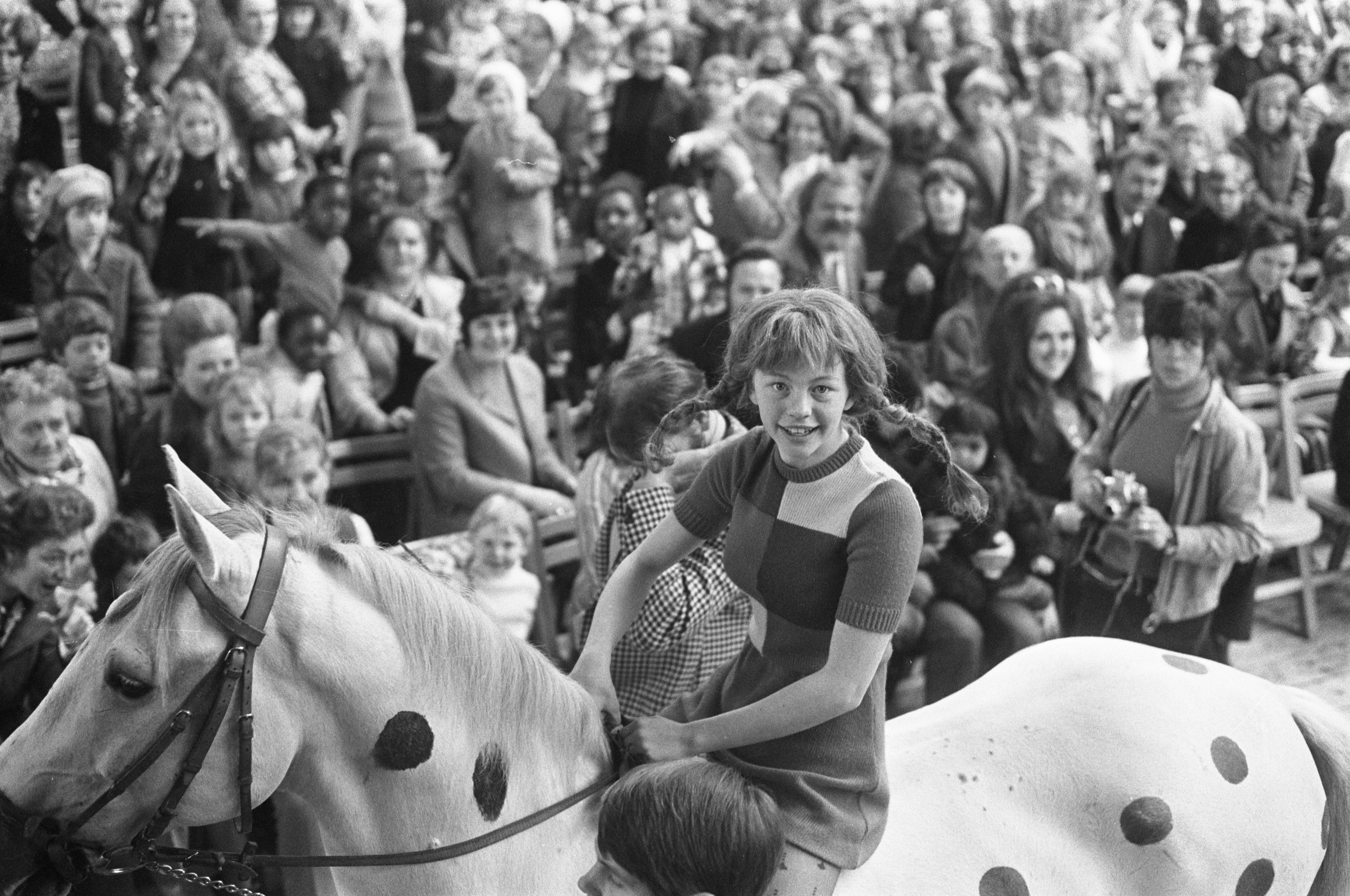
Bunting with Inger Nilsson during a visit in the Netherlands 1972.

Bunting (1961 – 1985/86) was a Swedish halfbreed grey horse made famous for his participation in Olle Hellbom's Pippi Longstocking films. He played Pippi's horse Lilla gubben.

Bunting was first called Illbatting and then Batting; he was owned by Rudolf Öberg, and had been a gift for him at his 60th birthday. When it was time to film the Pippi movies the film crew contacted him and used Bunting during filming. Bunting was completely white so the crew had to paint black dots onto his skin to make him look like the horse in the books. It was during filming that Inger Nilsson, the actress who played Pippi, chose the name of Lilla gubben ("Little old man"). In the books her horse is only mentioned as "the horse".

After the final film was completed Bunting returned to a riding school, and was later moved to a stable in Vallentuna where he later died at the age of 24.

== Filmography ==
- TV - 1969 - Pippi Långstrump
- 1970 - Pippi Långstrump på de sju haven
- 1970-På rymmen med Pippi Långstrump
- 1973 - Här kommer Pippi Långstrump
