= Robert Franklin Bunting =

American Presbyterian minister

- Born: May 9, 1828; Hookstown, Pennsylvania, U.S.
- Died: September 19, 1891 (aged 63); Gallatin, Tennessee, U.S.
- Education: Washington College; Princeton University; Princeton Theological Seminary; Hampden–Sydney College
- Occupation: Clergyman
- Spouses: Nina Ella Doxey; Chrissinda Sharpe Craig
- Children: 6
- Parent(s): John Bunting; Margaret Moody

Robert Franklin Bunting (1828–1891) was an American Presbyterian minister and Confederate chaplain.

== Early life ==
Robert Franklin Bunting was born on May 9, 1828, in Hookstown, Pennsylvania. His father was John Bunting and his mother, Margaret Moody. One of his maternal uncles was a Presbyterian minister, while another one was a Presbyterian elder. His mother encouraged him to become a Presbyterian minister.

Bunting graduated from Washington College in 1849. While in college, he joined the Sigma Alpha Epsilon fraternity. He received a master of arts degree from Princeton University, and a bachelor of divinity degree from the Princeton Theological Seminary in 1852. He later received a doctor of divinity degree from Hampden–Sydney College in 1867.

== Career ==
Bunting became a Presbyterian missionary in Texas in 1852. He planted churches in La Grange, Texas, Columbus, Texas, and Round Top, Texas. He planted the First Presbyterian Church of San Antonio in San Antonio, Texas, in 1856, and served as its minister until 1861.

Bunting was a co-founder of the Presbyterian Church in the Confederate States of America. During the American Civil War of 1861-1865, he served as a chaplain in the Terry's Texas Rangers of the Confederate States Army. Bunting believed the Texas army would win against Union troops because it had been victorious against the Mexican republic in the Texas Revolution. When two colonels died, he explained that God had wanted to warn the soldiers about idolatry, suggesting they should only look up to God. During the war, Bunting was also a war correspondent to two newspapers, the Houston-based Daily Telegraph and the Tri-Weekly Telegraph. He established a courier system for families of CSA members in Texas. Additionally, he established the "Texas Hospital", a Confederate hospital in Auburn, Alabama, in 1864.

In the postbellum years, Bunting was the minister of the First Presbyterian Church in Nashville, Tennessee. From 1869 to 1882, he served a Presbyterian church in Galveston, Texas. He was a pastor in Rome, Georgia, from 1882 to 1883. He was a "fiscal agent" for Rhodes College in Memphis, Texas, from 1885 to 1889. He also served on the board of trustees of Daniel Baker College in Brownwood, Texas. He returned to the ministry in 1889, when he served a church in Gallatin, Tennessee, until 1891.

Bunting was a member of the Knights Templar. He was also a member of the Odd Fellows.

== Personal life ==
Bunting married Nina Ella Doxey in 1853. After she died he married Chrissinda Sharpe Craig in 1860. They had six children.

== Death and legacy ==
Bunting died on September 19, 1891, in Gallatin, Tennessee. He received a Masonic funeral in Gallatin.

His papers are held at the Austin Presbyterian Theological Seminary. Additionally, his diaries are held at the Princeton Theological Seminary. In 2006, the University of Tennessee press published Our Trust is in the God of Battles: The Civil War Letters of Robert Franklin Bunting, Chaplain, Terry's Texas Rangers, edited by Thomas W. Cutrer, a Professor emeritus of History and American Studies at Arizona State University.
