= Burntollet Bridge incident =

1969 attack in Derry, Northern Ireland

Burntollet Bridge ambush
- Part of the Troubles
- Date: 4 January 1969
- Location: Burntollet, Derry, Northern Ireland; 54°56′24″N 7°12′56″W
- Goals: One man, one vote; Repeal of the Special Powers Act; An end to gerrymandering of electoral boundaries; Freedom of speech and assembly; Fair allocation of jobs and housing
- Methods: Protesting & Marching; Mob ambush
- Result: People's Democracy march ambushed by Loyalists

Parties
People's Democracy & local protesters	Ulster loyalists

Lead figures
Bernadette Devlin	Ronald Bunting

Number
400+	300; 100

Casualties and losses
At least 100 injured	small amount of injuries
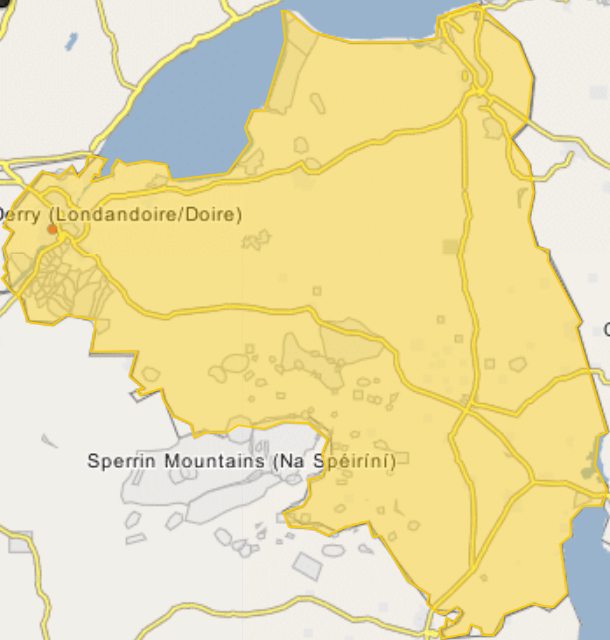
- Location within County Londonderry

Burntollet Bridge was the setting for an attack on 4 January 1969 during the first stages of the Troubles of Northern Ireland. A People's Democracy march from Belfast to Derry was attacked by Ulster loyalists whilst passing through Burntollet.

The march had been called in defiance of an appeal by Northern Ireland Prime Minister Terence O'Neill for a temporary end to protest. The Northern Ireland Civil Rights Association and some Derry nationalists had advised against it. Supporters of Ian Paisley, led by Major Ronald Bunting, denounced the march as seditious and mounted counter-demonstrations along the route.

At Burntollet an Ulster loyalist crowd numbering in the region of 300, including 100 off-duty members of the Ulster Special Constabulary (USC), attacked the civil rights marchers from adjacent high ground. Stones transported in bulk from William Leslie's quarry at Legahurry were used in the assault, as well as iron bars and sticks spiked with nails. Nearby members of the Royal Ulster Constabulary (RUC) did little to prevent the violence. Many of the marchers described their assailants' lack of concern about the police presence.

The violence was followed by renewed riots in Derry City. Terence O'Neill described the march as "a foolhardy and irresponsible undertaking" and said that some of the marchers and their supporters in Derry were "mere hooligans", outraging many, especially as the attackers had evaded prosecution. Loyalists celebrated the attack as a victory over Catholic "rebels".

The ambush at Burntollet irreparably damaged the credibility of the RUC.
