= Revolutionary Marxist Group (Ireland) =

Bulletin, publication of the Belfast R.M.G., from 1972

Revolutionary Marxist Group was a Trotskyist organisation in Ireland during the 1970s.

== Origins ==
Its origins lay in the 1971 split of United Secretariat of the Fourth International (USFI) supporters from the League for a Workers Republic. Many of the initial group had formerly been in the Young Socialists, along with some others who attended discussion meetings (such as Charlie Bird and Butch Roche) but who tended to drop off later when the RMG name was adopted and democratic centralism set in.

In 1972, they joined with a loose grouping in Belfast to form the Revolutionary Marxist Group, mainly under the influence of D.R. O'Connor Lysaght (known as Rayner Lysaght) and Anne Speed, Brendan Kelly, Betty Purcell. In 1974, the organisation affiliated to the USFI. The RMG campaigned against internment in Northern Ireland and took part in several public protests against it.

== Journal ==
The theoretical journal of the group was Marxist Review. The group focused on supporting a united Ireland and on gaining influence in the student movement. The RMG rejected the Éire Nua plan put forward by Ruairí Ó Brádaigh and Dáithí Ó Conaill, arguing EN was "too tied to the bourgeoisie". Marxist Review also criticised the ideas advocated by the conservative Irish writer Desmond Fennell, arguing that "Fennellism" is essentially idealistic and ultra-clerical". They also accused Fennell of being anti-feminist and anti-trade union.

== Views ==
The RMG was strongly pro-feminist, and RMG members took part in the "Irishwomen United" group in 1976, along with members of People's Democracy and the Irish Republican Socialist Party. "Irishwomen United" was a left-wing, anti-clerical, radical feminist group that called for the legalisation of contraception and abortion, equal pay for Irish women, and secular community-controlled schools.

== Change ==
In 1976, the group changed its name to the Movement for a Socialist Republic. Between 1977 and 1978 the MSR began fusion talks with People's Democracy. In November 1978 the two groups fused, adopting the name People's Democracy. In 1981 People's Democracy was recognised as the Irish Section of the Fourth International.

== Publications ==
- Towards a History of the Communist Party of Ireland by Donal Raynor O'Connor Lysaght (1972).

Dublin; Revolutionary Marxist Group.

- The E.E.C. and Ireland (1972) Dublin : Plough Book Service for Revolutionary Marxist Group.
- Irish Nationalism and British Imperialism by Robert Dorn (1973). Dublin; Plough Book Service for

Revolutionary Marxist Group.

- The Irish national question and the Communist Party : a contribution to the discussion on Stalinism by Robert Dorn.

Dublin; Revolutionary Marxist Group.

- Women in Ireland, their oppression, their struggle (1973). Dublin; Plough Book Service for Revolutionary Marxist Group.
- May Day manifesto of the Fourth International (1973) Dublin; Revolutionary Marxist Group.
- British Strategy in Northern Ireland, from the White Paper to the fall of Sunningdale (1975)

Dublin; Plough Book Service for Revolutionary Marxist Group.

- What is Trotskyism? by Ernest Mandel (Reprint) (1975). Dublin : Plough Book Service for Revolutionary Marxist Group.
- End of a Liberal: The Literary Politics of Conor Cruise O'Brien. D. R. O'Connor Lysaght,

Dublin, Plough Books (Movement for a Socialist Republic), [1976].

- Socialist Opposition in Eastern Europe : Czechoslovakia 1968: Workers and Students.

Jan Kavan. Dublin : Movement for a Socialist Republic [1975?].

- South Africa Erupts. Dublin : Movement for a Socialist Republic, 1976.
- Students and the education crisis : a socialist analysis.

Dublin : Movement for a Socialist Republic, [1976].

- Three years later: Chile 1976.

Norman Gamboa. [Dublin?] : Movement for a Socialist Republic, 1976.

- Legalised internment: how "justice" works in the 6 counties.

Belfast : Peoples Democracy with the Movement for a Socialist Republic, 1977.

- The Autonomy of the Women's Movement.

Dublin, Women's Commission, Movement for a Socialist Republic, 1977.
