= Eamonn McCann =

Northern Irish writer and activist (born 1943)

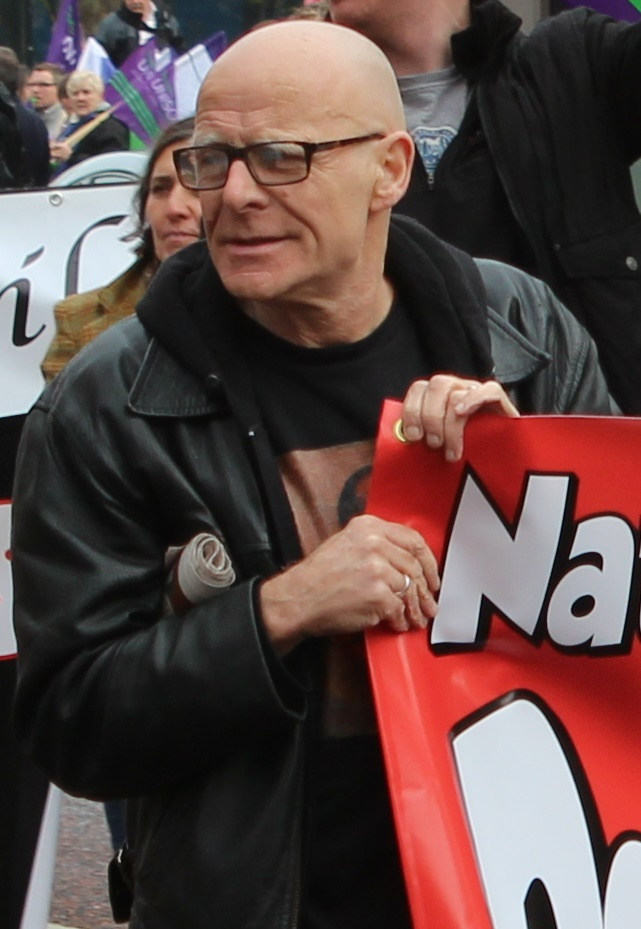
- McCann in 2016

Member of Derry City and Strabane District Council
- In office 2 May 2019 – 1 March 2021
- Preceded by: Sharon Duddy
- Succeeded by: Maeve O'Neill
- Constituency: The Moor

Member of the Legislative Assembly for Foyle
- In office 5 May 2016 – 26 January 2017
- Preceded by: Gerard Diver
- Succeeded by: Seat abolished

Personal details
- Born: 10 March 1943 (age 83) Derry, Northern Ireland
- Party: People Before Profit
- Other political affiliations: Northern Ireland Labour Party (1969)
- Children: 3
- Education: Queen's University Belfast

Eamonn McCann (born 10 March 1943) is an Irish political activist, former politician and journalist from Derry, Northern Ireland. McCann was a People Before Profit (PBP) Member of the Legislative Assembly (MLA) for Foyle from 2016 to 2017. In 2019, he was elected to Derry City and Strabane District Council, remaining in the position until his resignation for health reasons in March 2021.

== Early life and education ==
McCann was born and has lived most of his life in Derry. His father, Ned McCann, was a committed socialist and trade unionist. Growing up, trade union meetings would be held in the McCann household. Ned McCann would boast of being an "anti-Tory", that he had witnessed James Connolly speaking on the corner of New Lodge Road and Lepper Street in Belfast, and that he had never once voted for an Irish nationalist, always for Labour men.

Raised Catholic, Eamonn McCann attended St. Columb's College and is prominently featured in the documentary film, The Boys of St. Columb's. He later attended Queen's University Belfast, where he was president of the Literary and Scientific Society, the university's debating society. McCann left Queen's without graduating, a decision he says was forced on him by the university authorities acting in a sectarian manner towards someone they regarded as a troublemaker.

== Career as an activist ==
As a young man he was one of the original organisers of the Derry Housing Action Committee (DHAC), a radical campaign group focusing on access to social housing. DHAC organised, in conjunction with the Northern Ireland Civil Rights Association (NICRA), the second civil rights march in Northern Ireland. This march, which took place on 5 October 1968, is generally seen as the birthdate of the Northern Ireland Civil Rights Movement. His political contemporaries included Bernadette Devlin, for whom he served as an election agent. He stood for election in the Foyle constituency at the 1969 Northern Ireland general election for the Northern Ireland Labour Party, placing third with 1,993 votes (12.3% of the total).

He was tried (as one of the so-called Raytheon 9) in Belfast in May–June 2008 over alleged damage caused during the 2006 War on Lebanon to a facility operated by multinational arms company Raytheon in Derry. The jury unanimously acquitted McCann, and all the other defendants, of charges of criminal damage to property belonging to Raytheon. The jury had heard that the group's actions were prompted by repeated bombing of Lebanese property in which numerous civilians died, and the wish to protect those lives and that property from being attacked by Israeli forces with weapons, weaponry systems and missiles supplied by Raytheon. The judge dismissed charges of affray after hearing the prosecution evidence. However, McCann was convicted of the theft of two computer discs, for which he received a 12-month conditional discharge.

In a statement outside the court, McCann said: "[We] have been vindicated. ... The jury have accepted that we were reasonable in our belief that ... Israeli ... Forces were guilty of war crimes in Lebanon in the summer of 2006. The action we took was intended to have, and did have, the effect of hampering or delaying the commission of war crimes".

His appearance at the funeral of former Provisional Irish Republican Army (IRA) volunteer, Old Bailey bomber, and republican activist Dolours Price, and a tribute he paid to her, was criticised by a son-in-law of Jean McConville, who was kidnapped and murdered by the IRA. Price was suspected of being one of the paramilitaries who took part. McCann explained that her family had asked him to speak at her funeral. He said: "I don't think I said anything at Dolours Price's grave that contradicted that [calling McConville's murder 'a horrible and unforgivable act'] ... The point I had in mind, the point I was making, was there are some people deeply implicated in the cruel murder of Mrs McConville who appear not to be undergoing any inner turmoil. They appear to find it very easy to handle the knowledge of their own involvement in that murder".

He was elected as an MLA for Foyle in May 2016 but lost his seat in January 2017 when the number of seats in the Foyle constituency was reduced from six to five. McCann and People before Profit attracted criticism from Sinn Féin and pro-EU activists for supporting Brexit in an area with the fourth-highest 'Remain' vote (out of approximately 400 counting areas) in the whole of the United Kingdom.

In May 2019 he was elected to Derry and Strabane District Council as a PBP candidate in The Moor electoral area. In March 2021, he announced his resignation from the council for health reasons.

== Campaigning work ==
McCann was central to the setting up of the Bloody Sunday Justice Campaign; the role of his investigative journalism and decades of campaigning for justice for the Bloody Sunday families was recognised in 2010 when several of the families proposed him for the Paul Foot Award for campaigning journalism. Their citation said: "EAMONN McCANN has been using his journalism to campaign for justice for the Bloody Sunday families for almost 40 years. The publication of the Saville Report in June marked a victory for the families, a victory of which McCann was very much a part."

In February 1972, within a month of the killings, McCann published the first pamphlet on Bloody Sunday, What Happened in Derry. Throughout the 1970s, 1980s and 1990s he wrote about the injustice of Bloody Sunday whenever he got the opportunity. In the run-up to 1992, the 20th anniversary of the massacre, McCann made a proposal to the families for a book to mark the occasion. The publication of Bloody Sunday in Derry: What Really Happened was crucial in helping to bring together all the Bloody Sunday families for the first time into a single campaign.

Throughout the 1990s McCann wrote constantly about Bloody Sunday, ensuring that every new piece of evidence about what had happened on the day and in the course of the subsequent cover-up was analysed and publicised. He wrote in the local Derry papers, in the Belfast Telegraph, The Irish Times, the Sunday Tribune, in the London Independent, The Guardian, The Observer – anywhere he could place a story. With the announcement of the Saville Tribunal, McCann's writing on Bloody Sunday came into its own. While other journalists focused only on the evidence of the more high-profile witnesses, McCann attended almost every day of the tribunal. He attended the hearings in London's Central Hall, paying his own costs to travel to and from London and staying with family while there. He wrote a weekly analysis for the Sunday Tribune in Dublin, and covered the proceedings daily for the Irish commercial radio station Today FM, as well as contributing articles to the Guardian, Observer, Irish Times, Irish Mirror and Irish Daily Mail.

== Writings and media work ==
McCann's voice
from the BBC programme The Media Show, 16 June 2010

McCann currently writes for the Belfast Telegraph, The Irish Times and the Derry Journal. He has written a column for the Dublin-based magazine Hot Press, and is a frequent commentator on the BBC, RTÉ and other broadcast media. He worked as a journalist for the Sunday World newspaper and contributed to the original In Dublin magazine, among others.

Much of his journalistic work reflects what he himself describes as a "shuddering fascination" with religion which, when coupled with his profound skepticism, has made it a topic to which he has often returned.

In March 2008, McCann spoke with National Public Radio in the United States about the solidarity between the civil rights movement in Northern Ireland and the civil rights movement in the U.S.

In March 2014, following Crimea's referendum on joining Russia, McCann had a piece published in The Irish Times on the situation there. He commented: "After six years in office, Obama believes he has a right to invade anywhere, bomb anything, kill anybody whose jib the CIA doesn't like the cut of, irrespective of national or international law or, indeed, of the provisions of the US constitution. And now he lectures Putin on the necessity of 'respecting international law'. He has a nerve." In the same piece, he wrote: "Vladimir Putin may run a vicious regime but the people of Crimea have a right to be accepted as Russian if that's what they want, which evidently they do", and added: "Putin is right that the main motivation of the US and NATO has been to encircle and enfeeble his country. It might be a close-run thing, but in this instance, Russia has more right on its side than the West".

In 2021, McCann was interviewed during the Docs Ireland documentary festival in Belfast, following a screening of his appearance on After Dark.

List of works

- War and an Irish Town (1973)
- War and Peace in Northern Ireland
- Dear God – The Price of Religion in Ireland

He has also edited two books on Bloody Sunday:

- Bloody Sunday: What Really Happened (1992)
- The Bloody Sunday Inquiry: The Families Speak Out (2005).

== Personal life ==
McCann was the partner of Mary Holland (1935–2004), a journalist who worked for The Observer and The Irish Times. He has a daughter from that relationship, Kitty, who is now a journalist for The Irish Times, and a son, Luke, who works for the US-based human rights think tank The Center for Economic and Social Rights. The academic and activist Goretti Horgan has been his partner since the mid-1980s and they have an adult daughter, Matty.

McCann is a supporter of Derry City F.C. In the 2002 film Bloody Sunday, McCann was played by Irish actor Gerard Crossan.

Northern Ireland Assembly
Preceded by Gerard Diver	MLA for Foyle; 2016–2017	Seat abolished
