= People's Democracy (Ireland) =

Defunct Trotskyist political organisation in Northern Ireland

- Founded: 1968
- Dissolved: 1996
- Ideology: Socialism; Trotskyism; Irish nationalism Irish republicanism Factions: Anarchism (1968–1974)
- International affiliation: Fourth International (post-reunification)
- Colours: Green and red

People's Democracy (PD) was a political organisation that arose from the Northern Ireland civil rights movement. It held that civil rights could be achieved only by the establishment of a socialist republic for all of Ireland. It demanded more radical reforms of the government of Northern Ireland than the Northern Ireland Civil Rights Association.

== Foundation ==
It was founded on 9 October 1968 at a meeting held in the Union Debating Society, the contemporary debating society in Queen's University Belfast. A catalyst for its foundation had been the attack on a Northern Ireland Civil Rights Association (NICRA) march in Derry on 5 October by the Royal Ulster Constabulary (RUC).

The group consisted mainly of students who were involved with the Northern Ireland Civil Rights Association or left wing groups such as the Labour Clubs and Young Socialist Alliance.

At the meeting the group decided on five aims:

- One man, one vote
- Repeal of the Special Powers Act
- An end to gerrymandering of electoral boundaries
- Freedom of speech and assembly
- Fair allocation of jobs and housing

It was initially led by a committee of ten members which consisted of Queen's University students Malcolm Miles, Fergus Woods, Anne McBurnley, Ian Godall, Bernadette Devlin, Joe Martin, Eddie McCamely, Michael O'Kane and Patricia Drinan, as well as Kevin Boyle, a law lecturer at QUB. Other prominent members included Eilis McDermott, Cyril Toman, Eamon McCann and Michael Farrell.

The name of the group was selected by accident, according to Bernadette Devlin.

The next evening our leaflet and poster were approved by a mass meeting of the students, and taken off to be printed. John D. Murphy, our printer, got the material late at night and only then noticed that our organisation had no name. To comply with the law, he had to put up the name of the organisation responsible at the bottom of the leaflet, and, the story goes, he read through it, decided it was all about people's rights and christened us People's Democracy.

After marches in Belfast, in imitation of Martin Luther King Jr.'s March 1965 Selma to Montgomery marches, about 40 People's Democracy members held a four-day march between Belfast and Derry starting on 1 January 1969. The march was repeatedly attacked by loyalists along its route, including an incident at Burntollet bridge on 4 January where the marchers were attacked by about 200 unionists, including off-duty special constables, armed with iron bars, bottles and stones, while the RUC stood by and watched.

PD became increasingly radicalised as a result of these events. They also attacked the censorship laws in the Republic — earning a rebuke from Ruairi Quinn and Basil Miller, then leaders of Students for Democratic Action, a revolutionary socialist student organisation, for letting British imperialism off the hook. In later years, members of the PD either quit politics altogether or became independent left-wing activists (such as Devlin and Farrell).

== Development ==
In 1971, PD became a founder of the Socialist Labour Alliance.

In the mid-1970s, the experience of the Ulster Workers' Council strike led to PD predicting a loyalist takeover in Northern Ireland, but it later came round to the view that this perspective was incorrect, giving loyalism a degree of autonomy from imperialism which it did not possess. The minority which clung to the old perspective left to form the Left Revolutionary Group, becoming the Red Republican Party in 1976, which was moribund by 1978.

During the 1970s, PD evolved towards Trotskyist positions and, by merging with the Dublin-based Movement for a Socialist Republic, was recognised by the reunified Fourth International as its Irish section.

PD was especially active around the issues of internment and prisoners' rights. Following the formation of the National H-Block/Armagh Committee in 1979 to build support for the Republican prisoners then on the "blanket protest" in support of political status and the subsequent death of Bobby Sands and nine of his comrades during the H-Block hunger strikes, a number of members of the organisation, led by Vincent Doherty - then a member of the Political Committee and a former party general election candidate - argued that PD should join Sinn Féin, which had moved openly to the left in the late 1970s and early 1980s.

In 1981, two members of People's Democracy were elected to Belfast City Council. John McAnulty and Fergus O'Hare were elected in a joint campaign with the IRSP. Fergus O'Hare won the council seat of Gerry Fitt, a sitting Westminster MP. O'Hare had been a founding member of the National H-Block/Armagh Committee and had previously been chairperson of the Political Hostages Release Committee which spearheaded the campaign against internment in the early 1970s. He subsequently went on to found the first Irish-language secondary school in Northern Ireland Meánscoil Feirste.

When Sinn Féin ended its boycott of elections and gained mass support among the republican community, PD entered a political crisis. From 1982 on, a number of activists left them and joined Sinn Féin. At a PD national conference in 1986, a group including Anne Speed proposed the dissolution of the group and that the members all join SF as individuals. This position was defeated by 19 votes to five. A few weeks later the minority of five resigned from PD followed by their supporters and joined Sinn Féin. The remaining members who continued to oppose this view maintained PD as a small propaganda group.

== Election history ==
=== Northern Ireland ===
==== General elections ====
Election	First Preference Vote	%	Seats
1969	23,645	4.2%	0 / 52
1982	442	0.07%	0 / 78

==== Local elections ====
Election	First Preference Vote	%	±	Seats	±
1981	4,734	0.71%	N/A	2 / 526	N/A
1985	131	0.02%	▼0.69	0 / 565	▼2

=== Republic of Ireland ===
==== Dáil Éireann ====
Election	First Preference Vote	%	Seats
1992	370 (Note: Joe Harrington in Limerick East)	0.02%	0 / 166

==== Local elections ====
Election	First Preference Vote	%	±	Seats	±
1985	589	0.04%	New	1 / 883	New
1991	905	0.06%	▲0.02	1 / 883	Steady

== See also ==
- People Before Profit Alliance
