= 2025 Dáil speaking rights dispute =

Political dispute in Ireland

In early 2025, Dáil Éireann, the house of representatives of the Oireachtas (the legislature of Ireland), was embroiled in a protracted dispute over speaking rights, primarily concerning a group of independent TDs who support the government coalition of Fianna Fáil and Fine Gael but seek opposition speaking privileges. This contention led to significant parliamentary disruptions and debates about procedural fairness. On 25 March 2025, the Dáil approved a motion proposed by the Government Chief Whip amending the standing orders to create a category of TDs who are classed as "Other Members" rather than "Government" or "Opposition" and who receive speaking time separate from either group. On 26 March, the Opposition informed the Ceann Comhairle Verona Murphy they would be tabling a motion of no confidence against her as a part of the dispute. On 1 April 2025 Murphy won a motion of no confidence; it was the first time since the establishment of the Dáil in 1919 that a Ceann Comhairle has stood against a motion of no confidence.

== Background ==
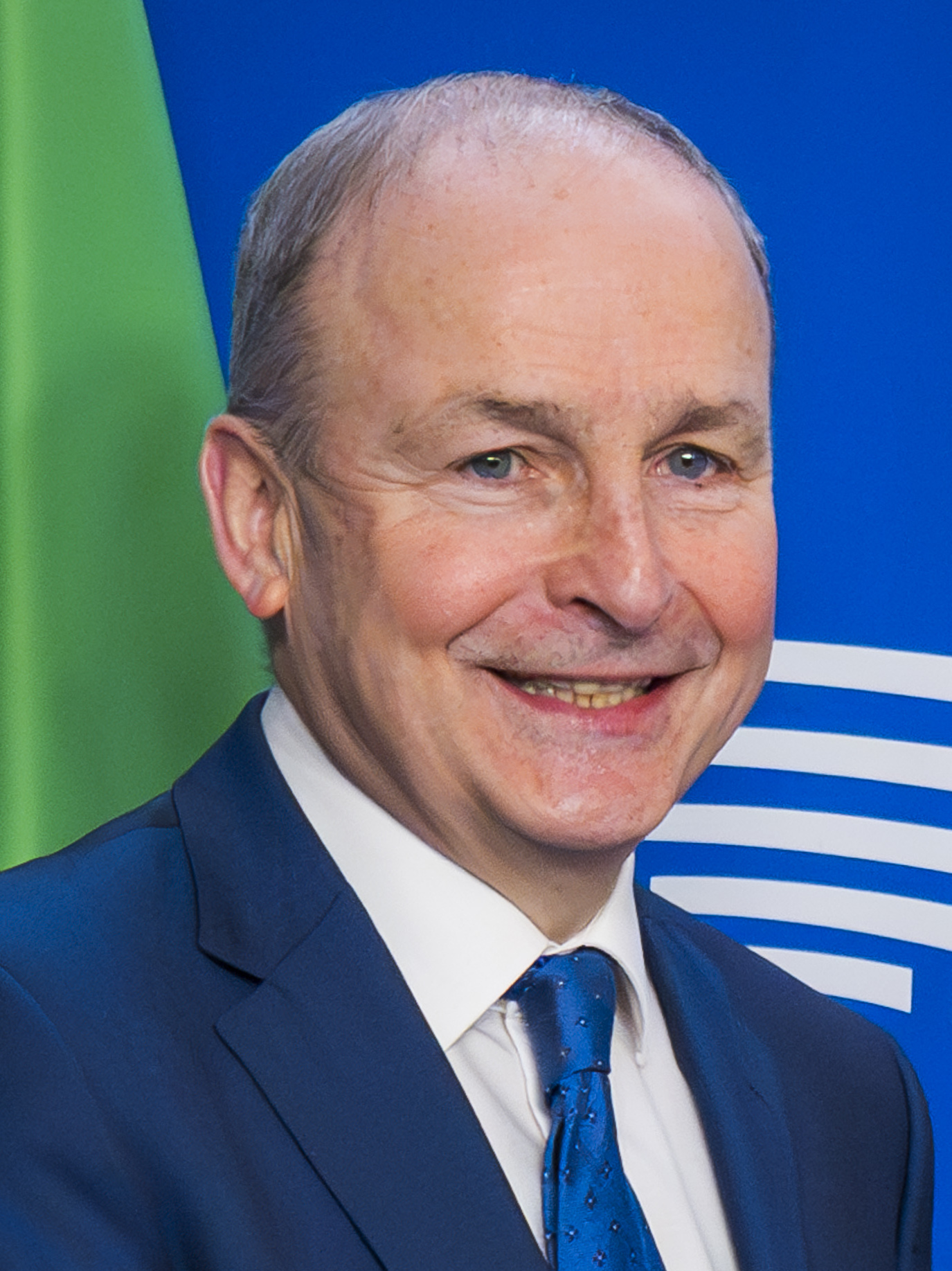
Micheál Martin, leader of Fianna Fáil and Taoiseach

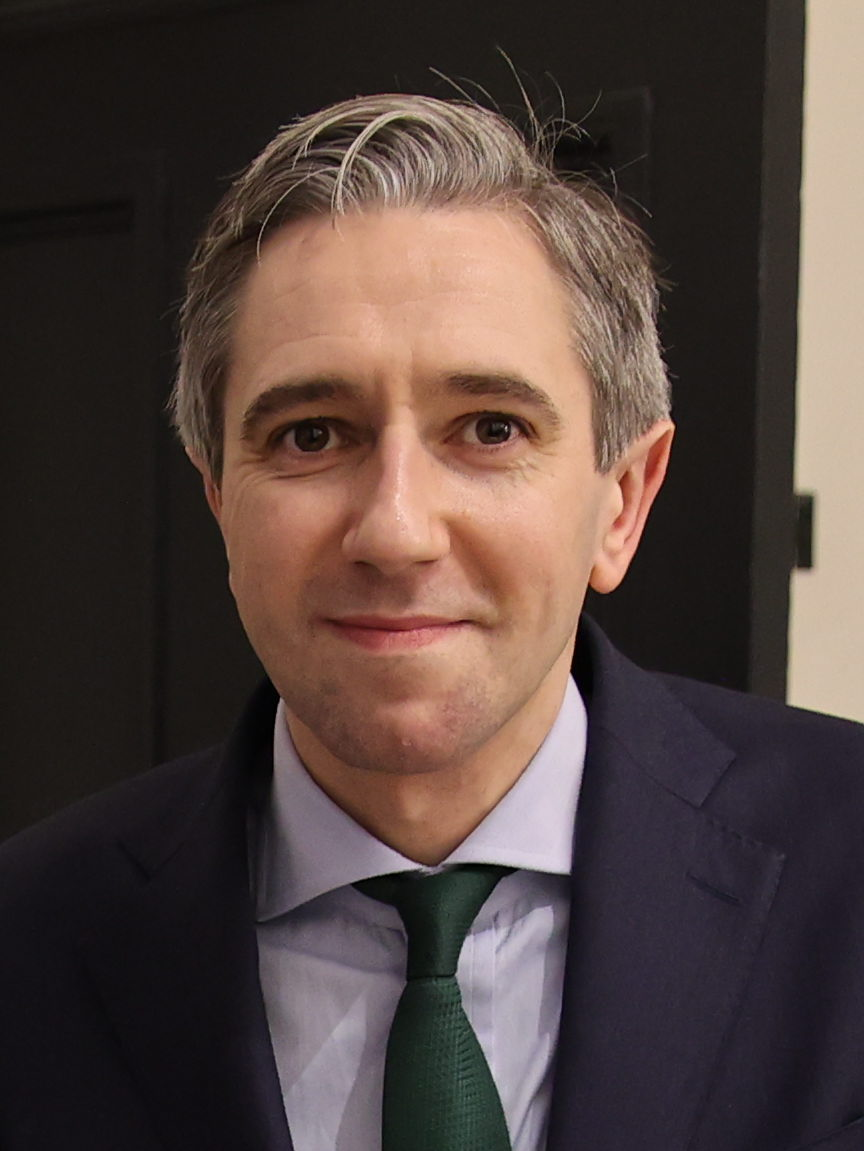
Simon Harris, leader of Fine Gael and Tánaiste

Following the November 2024 Irish general election, Fianna Fáil and Fine Gael formed the government of Ireland.

Since 2011, Dáil Éireann has allowed independent TDs and small parties to form "Technical groups" in order to avail of more speaking time. Prior to March 2025, the standing orders of the Dáil stated that only members of the opposition could form a technical group. Independent TDs are members of the Dáil who do not belong to a political party.

The 2024 general election took place on 29 November. In the aftermath, Fianna Fáil and Fine Gael negotiated support for a new government with the Regional Group of independent Teachta Dála (TDs). When the Dáil first met on 18 December, the party leaders encouraged their TDs to support a member of this group, Verona Murphy, as Ceann Comhairle. She was successful in the 2024 Ceann Comhairle election. No candidate was nominated for appointment as Taoiseach on that date, as government formation negotiations were ongoing.

In January agreement was reached to form a government with 5 Independent TDs serving as ministers of state and with the support of independent TDs Michael Lowry, Barry Heneghan, Gillian Toole, and Danny Healy-Rae.

== Initial disruptions in January 2025 ==
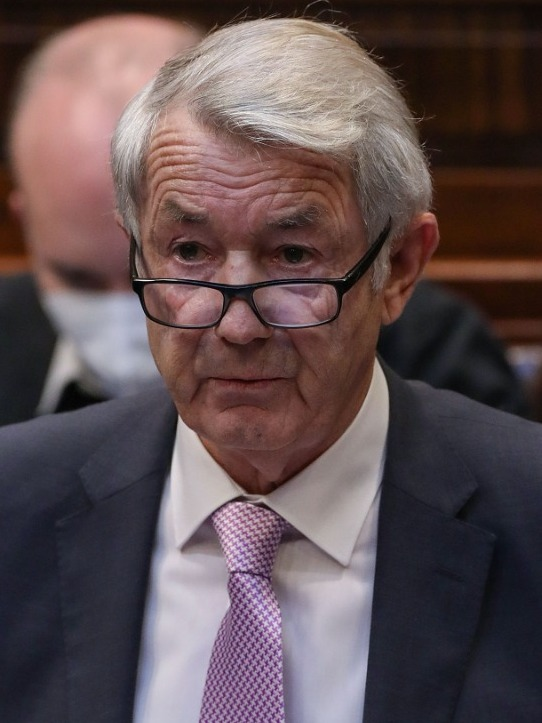
Michael Lowry led the independent TDs in negotiations with Fine Gael and Fianna Fáil to form a government, and was considered a "kingmaker"

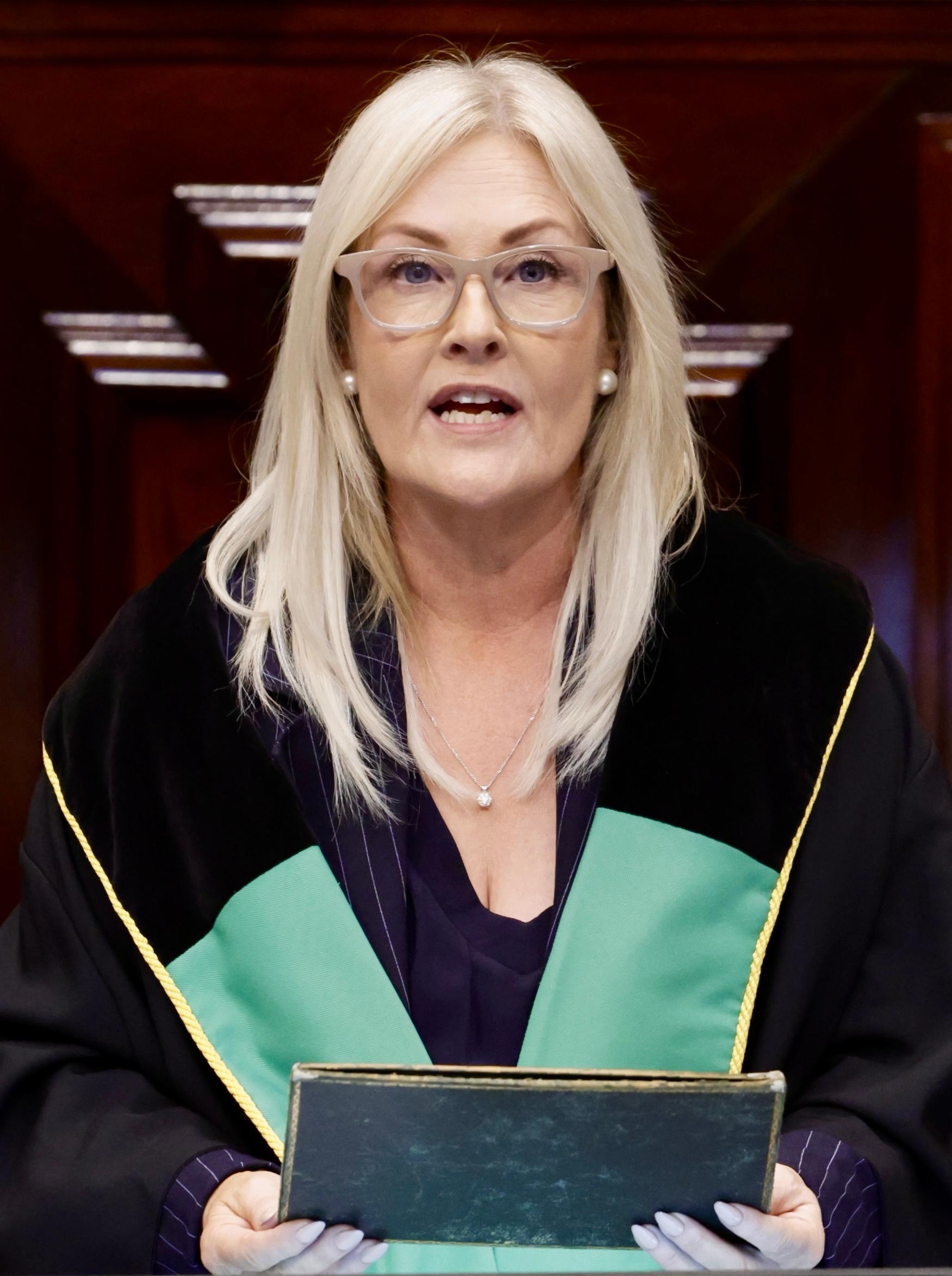
As part of the deal struck between Fianna Fáil, Fine Gael and the Regional Independent Group, Fianna Fáil and Fine supported Verona Murphy's bid to become Ceann Comhairle, a role which oversees the running of the Dáil.

The controversy emerged during government formation talks when Fianna Fáil and Fine Gael negotiated with a group of nine independent TDs led by Michael Lowry. This group, known as the Regional Independent Group, reached an agreement to support the Government.

The election of Murphy to the role of Ceann Comhairle was criticised, particularly by the opposition. The role of Ceann Comhairle is supposed to be impartial and non-partisan as they oversee the running of the Dáil. However, critics suggested it would not be possible for Murphy to be neutral in her rulings as she explicitly owed her position to the government.

Following the coalition agreement, six TDs (Michael Lowry, Danny Healy-Rae, Barry Heneghan, Gillian Toole, Carol Nolan and Mattie McGrath) sought recognition as a technical group within the Dáil. Traditionally, technical groups consist of opposition TDs who collaborate to gain access to speaking time, legislative proposals, and committee nominations. However, as four of these TDs had been involved in government negotiations, opposition parties argued that recognising them as a technical group would blur the lines between the Government and the Opposition, and that this action would go against the standing orders of the Dáil.

== Delay in nominating a Taoiseach ==
Opposition parties, made up of Sinn Féin, Labour, the Social Democrats, People Before Profit–Solidarity, the Green Party, Aontú and Independent Ireland, strongly opposed the move, arguing that it would divert speaking time away from the Opposition. The 34th Dáil met on 22 January to propose and nominate a new Taoiseach. Traditionally, this is simply a procedural matter with a member of the largest party of the incoming government being appointed the office following a vote. However, opposition TDs refused to vote on the matter and rose to protest the planned speaking rights arrangement. Verona Murphy, the Ceann Comhairle, was unable to regain control of the proceedings and suspended the Dáil several times. However, the situation did not change and Murphy was forced to adjourn the Dáil entirely. The situation gained international attention, highlighting what was described as "unprecedented chaos" in the Dáil. That night, emergency talks were held amongst politicians. During these discussions, government officials clarified that the proposed changes would not curtail the speaking time of opposition TDs. Faced with the prospect of further legislative paralysis, opposition leaders agreed to withdraw their blocking measures. This decision enabled the Dáil to reconvene the following morning, 23 January 2025, allowing the nomination and appointment of Micheál Martin as Taoiseach. However, the wider issue of whether independent TDs who had supported the government could form a technical group was not resolved and a stalemate continued.

== Ceann Comhairle's ruling in February ==
On 4 February, following legal advice, Ceann Comhairle Murphy ruled that the Lowry-led group did not meet the criteria for a technical group. Opposition parties welcomed this ruling, viewing it as a reinforcement of parliamentary norms.

In response to the ongoing stalemate, a cross-party Dáil Reform Committee was established to address the issue. However, no consensus was reached. Eventually, the Government used its majority on the committee to pass its proposal on 26 February, leading to further opposition outcry. Following the committee's decision, the Opposition parties agreed to withdraw pairing arrangements for ministers absent on official business.

== Government's proposal and opposition's reaction in March 2025 ==
Following this, the Government proposed an alternative arrangement: these TDs would be classified as "others," distinct from both Government and Opposition. This classification would grant them speaking time on Tuesdays and Wednesdays, allow them to question the Taoiseach, and provide additional time during Minister's Questions and private member's debates.

The Government insisted that these changes will not reduce Opposition speaking time, citing an overall expansion of Dáil speaking slots. However, the Opposition contested this claim, noting that time previously reserved for Opposition members, such as written questions to the Taoiseach on Wednesdays, has been eliminated. The opposition parties called the introduction of the "Others" label a "brazen" attempt to blur the lines between government supporters and the opposition. They argued that such changes could undermine the Dáil's function of holding the government accountable.

== Motion passed in March ==
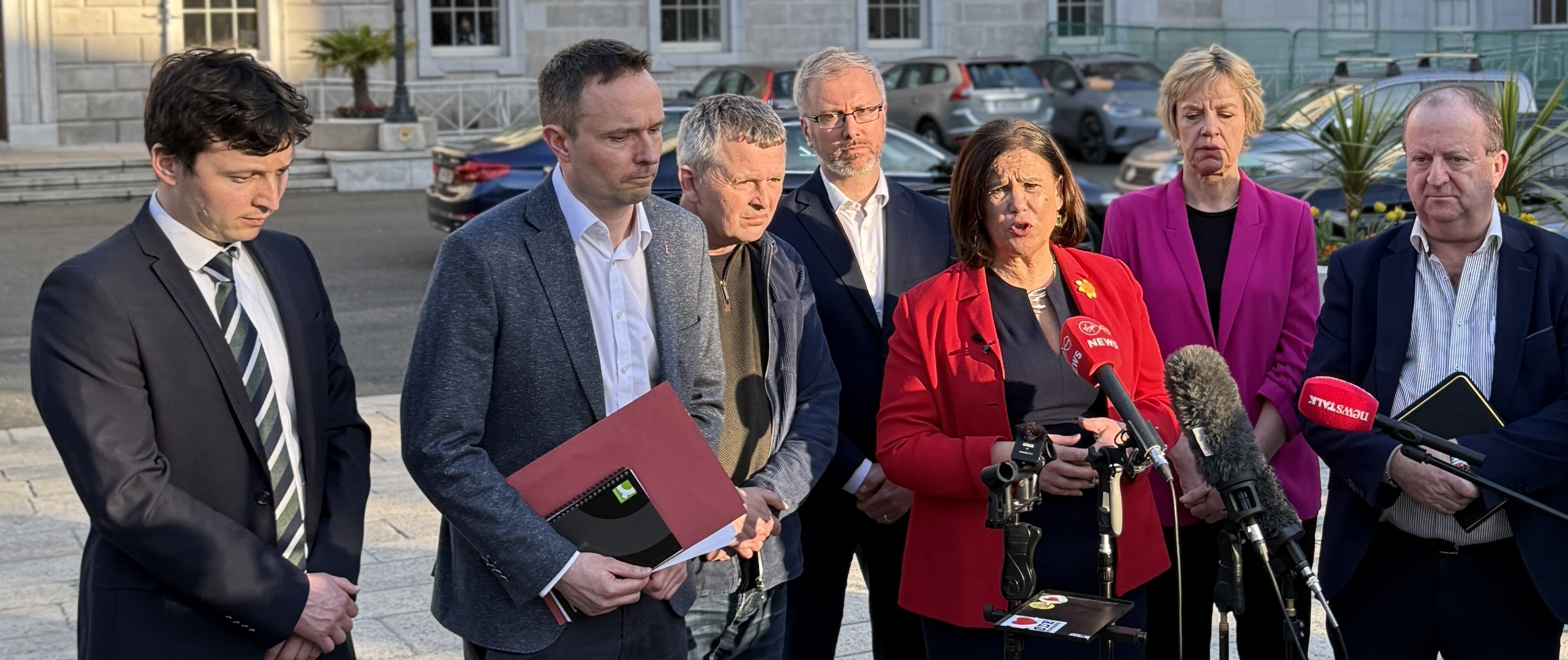
Leaders and members of Ireland's opposition parties speaking to the media on 25 March 2025 against the government's changes to speaking rights

On 25 March a motion passed through the Dáil which created a category of TDs who are classed as "Other Members" rather than "Government" or "Opposition" and who receive speaking time. The motion also included new speaking slots for coalition backbenchers and government-aligned independents, a reduction in time for debating the order of business and halving Taoiseach's Questions time.

The motion passed with a vote of 93 to 74, following heated exchanges and disruptions. A motion to amend the vote proposed by the Opposition was not heard. The session was marked by disorder, prompting the Ceann Comhairle to suspend proceedings after describing the behaviour of some deputies as a "holy show". During a fractious Leaders' Questions session, Taoiseach Micheál Martin defended the changes, stating that they did not alter Opposition speaking time or reduce government accountability. He dismissed Opposition reactions as "wholly disproportionate." Sinn Féin Leader Mary Lou McDonald strongly criticised the move, calling it an "absurd brazen stroke" that would undermine the Dáil. Labour Leader Ivana Bacik also condemned the reforms, arguing they were designed to benefit certain independent TDs. Independent Ireland leader Michael Collins described the changes as a "dark day for democracy," while the Taoiseach downplayed the impact, emphasising that the adjustments amounted to a minor shift in scheduling.

== Motion of no confidence in Murphy ==
On 26 March the Opposition parties informed Murphy that they had no confidence in her to perform the role of Ceann Comhairle and that she had a week to consider resigning before they tabled an official motion of no confidence in her. Murphy issued a statement in which she defended her position and stated that she "fully intend[ed] to continue to carry out the onerous office to which [she] was elected". On 1 April 2025 Murphy won a motion of no confidence; it was the first time ever a vote of no confidence in a Ceann Comhairle had taken place. (Note: In 2009 Ceann Comhairle John O'Donoghue faced a motion of no confidence but he chose to resign before any vote took place.)
