= Oireachtas =

Bicameral legislature of the Republic of Ireland

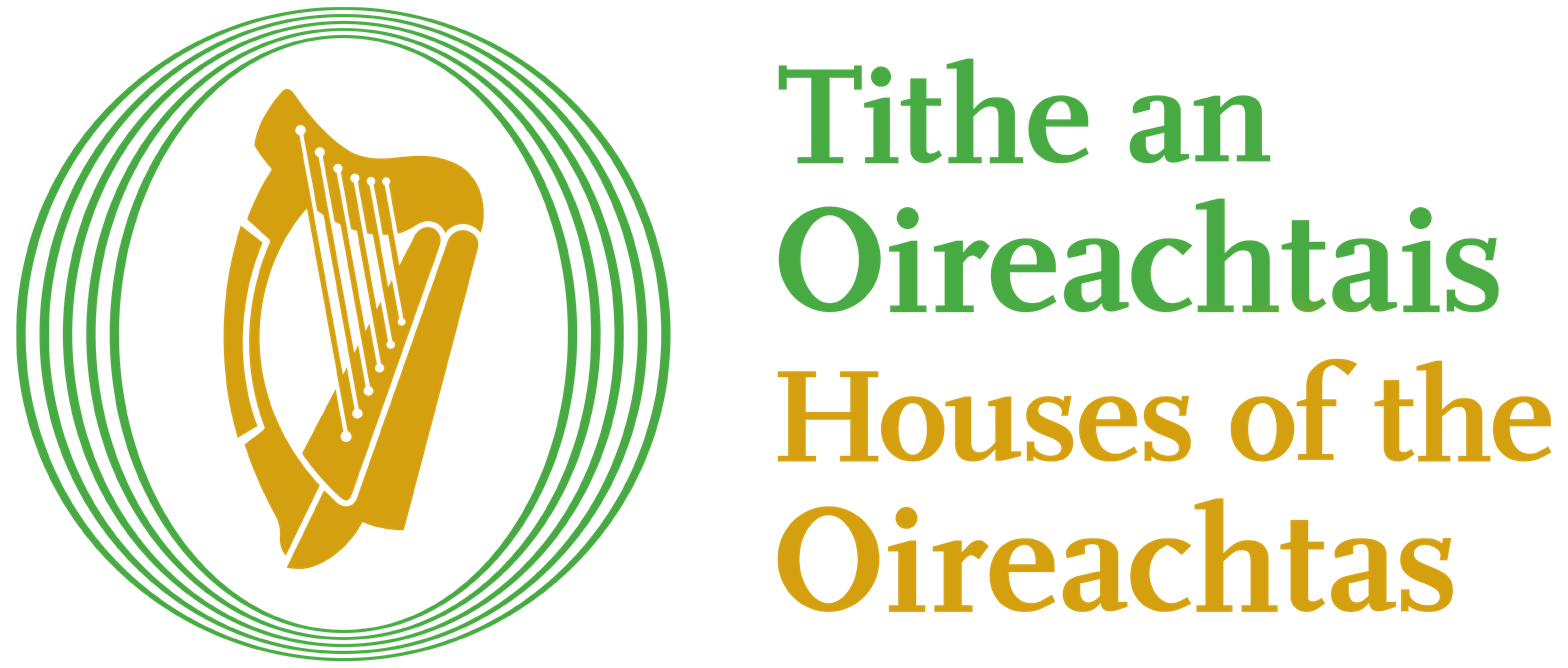

Type
- Type: Bicameral
- Houses: Dáil Éireann (34th); Seanad Éireann (27th)

History
- Established: 29 December 1937 (Modern form)
- Preceded by: Irish Free State Oireachtas

Leadership
- President of Ireland: Catherine Connolly since 11 November 2025
- Ceann Comhairle: Verona Murphy since 18 December 2024
- Leas-Cheann Comhairle: John McGuinness, FF since 19 February 2025
- Cathaoirleach: Mark Daly, FF since 12 February 2025
- Leas-Chathaoirleach: Maria Byrne, FG since 19 February 2025
- Taoiseach: Micheál Martin, FF since 23 January 2025
- Tánaiste: Simon Harris, FG since 23 January 2025
- Leader of the Opposition: Mary Lou McDonald, SF since 27 June 2020

Structure
- Seats: Dáil Éireann: 174; Seanad Éireann: 60
- Dáil political groups: Current Composition Government (90) Fianna Fáil (48) Fine Gael (38) Independent (4) Supported by (3) Independent (3) Opposition (80) Sinn Féin (39) Social Democrats (12) Labour (11) Independent Group (7) (Note: Technical group formed for parliamentary speaking rights. This is not a political alliance, but a parliamentary group.) Independent Ireland (4) Aontú (2) Independent (1) Inds. and Smaller Parties Group (7) PBP–Solidarity (3) Green (1) 100% Redress (1) Independents (2) (Note: Includes Séamus Healy who is a member of the Workers and Unemployed Action party but was elected as an independent candidate.) Independent (4) Ceann Comhairle Ceann Comhairle (1)
- Seanad political groups: Current Composition Government (36) Fianna Fáil (19) Fine Gael (17) Opposition (24) Sinn Féin (6) Independent Group (8) Independent (8) (Note: Includes Rónán Mullen who is a member of the Human Dignity Alliance party but was elected as an independent candidate.) Civil Engagement (4) Independent (4) Cross-Party Group (4) Labour (2) Green (1) Social Democrats (1) Aontú (1) Independent (1)
- Joint committees: 20: Agriculture, Food and the Marine; Autism; Children, Disability, Equality, Integration, and Youth; Disability Matters; Education, Further and Higher Education, Research, Innovation, and Science; Enterprise, Trade and Employment; Environment and Climate Action; European Union Affairs; Finance, Public Expenditure and Reform, and Taoiseach; Foreign Affairs and Defence; Gender Equality; Implementation of the Good Friday Agreement; Irish Language, Gaeltacht and the Irish-speaking Community; Health; Housing, Local Government and Heritage; Justice; Public Petitions; Social Protection, Community and Rural Development and the Islands; Transport and Communications; Tourism, Culture, Arts, Sport and Media
- Length of term: Not exceeding 5 years
- Authority: Articles 15−27, Constitution of Ireland
- Salary: €105,271 per year + expenses (TDs); €73,726 per year + expenses (Senators)

Elections
- Dáil voting system: Proportional representation (single transferable vote)
- Seanad voting system: Indirect election
- Last Dáil election: 29 November 2024
- Last Seanad election: 30 January 2025
- Next general election: By 2030

Meeting place
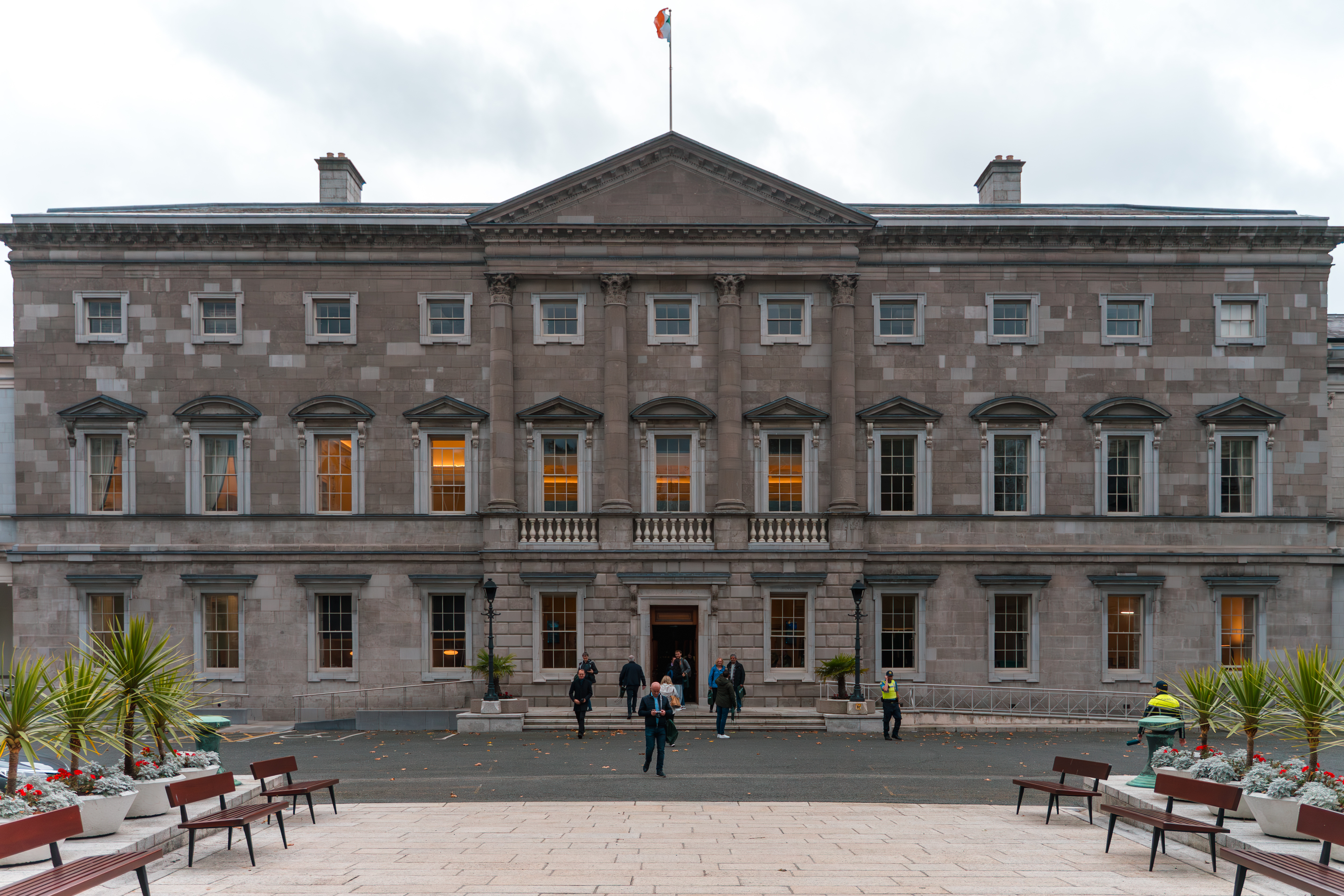
- Leinster House, Kildare Street, Dublin

Website
- www.oireachtas.ie

Constitution
- Constitution of Ireland

Rules
- "Dáil Éireann: Standing Orders Relative to Public Business 2025" (PDF).; "Seanad Éireann – Standing Orders Relative to Public Business 2026" (PDF).

The Oireachtas (/ˈɛrəxtəs/ EH-rəkh-təs; Irish: [ˈɛɾʲaxt̪ˠəsˠ]) is the bicameral parliament of Ireland. The Oireachtas consists of the president of Ireland and the two Houses of the Oireachtas (Irish: Tithe an Oireachtais): Dáil Éireann (lower house) and Seanad Éireann (upper house). (Note: Although Article 15.1 of the Constitution of Ireland uses the terms National Parliament, House of Representatives and Senate as descriptions, elsewhere in the Constitution and in legislation, they are referred to only by their Irish-language names.) The Dáil has greater powers and functions than the Seanad.

The Houses of the Oireachtas sit in Leinster House in Dublin, an eighteenth-century ducal palace.

== Etymology ==
The word oireachtas comes from the Irish word airecht/oireacht ("deliberative assembly of freemen; assembled freemen; assembly, gathering; patrimony, territory"), ultimately from the word airig ("freeman"). Its first recorded use as the name of a legislative body was within the Irish Free State.

== Composition ==
The President of Ireland is directly elected once every seven years, and may serve a maximum of two terms. Where there is only one candidate for president, no ballot will be taken, and the candidate will be deemed elected at the close of nominations.

Dáil Éireann is directly elected under universal suffrage of all Irish citizens who are residents and at least eighteen years old. Non-Irish citizens may be enfranchised by law, which currently extends to British citizens. By law, a Dáil term may last no longer than five years. The Dáil can be dissolved by the president at any time at the request of the Taoiseach, although the president may decline the request if the Taoiseach has ceased to retain the support of the majority of the Dáil. Dáil elections use the electoral system of proportional representation by means of a single transferable vote. The membership of the Dáil must be fixed by law at between one member for 20,000 to 30,000 of the population. For the 34th Dáil elected in 2024, there are 174 TDs.

The Seanad has a fixed membership of 60: 11 members nominated by the Taoiseach, 6 elected by two university constituencies, and 43 are elected from vocational panels with an electorate of councillors and members of the Oireachtas.

Members of the Dáil and Seanad are collectively described as "members of the Oireachtas" or "Oireachtas members". This contrasts with usage in some other legislatures, where "Member of Parliament" or "Congressman" is often restricted to members of the lower house of Parliament/Congress. The President of Ireland, although a constituent part of the Oireachtas, is neither a house of the Oireachtas nor a member of the Oireachtas.

Oireachtas members and Members of the European Parliament for Irish constituencies are collectively described as "legislators" and considered as a single group for some purposes; for example, the Fianna Fáil "parliamentary party" comprises all the party's legislators.

== Powers ==
The Oireachtas has exclusive power to:

- Legislate, including a power vested in the Dáil of approving the financial resolutions relevant to the budget. However, the courts have allowed the Oireachtas to delegate limited legislative powers to other entities, such as Government Ministers.
- Create subordinate legislatures.
- Propose changes to the constitution (must be initiated in the Dáil), which must then be submitted to a referendum.
- Raise military or armed forces.
- Allow international agreements to become part of the domestic law of the state.
- Pass certain laws having an extraterritorial effect (in accordance with the similar practices of other states).
- Resolve that a state of emergency exists in the case of a time of war or armed invasion taking place in which the State is not a participant

=== Limitations ===
- Laws are invalid if, and to the extent that, they are repugnant to the constitution.
  - In a time of war or armed emergency, nothing in the constitution will invalidate a law for the purpose of securing public order and the preservation of the State, with a specific exclusion for legislation permitting capital punishment
- In the event of a conflict, EU law takes precedence over acts of the Oireachtas, as is common throughout the European Union.
- It may not retrospectively criminalise acts that were not illegal at the time they were committed.
- It may not enact any law providing for the imposition of the death penalty, even during a state of emergency.

== Legislation ==
To become law, a bill must first be approved by both the Dáil and in most circumstances the Seanad (although the Dáil can override a Seanad refusal to pass a bill after a delay of 180 days), and then signed into law by the president. Bills to amend the Constitution must also be approved by the people in a referendum prior to being presented to the President. In most circumstances, the president is required to sign all laws approved by the Houses of the Oireachtas, although the president has the power to refer most bills to the Supreme Court for a ruling on constitutionality. The powers of the Seanad are in effect limited to delay rather than veto. It is the Dáil, therefore, that is the supreme tier of the Irish legislature. The general enacting formula for Acts of the Oireachtas is: "Be it enacted by the Oireachtas as follows:—", for an act with a preamble this enacting formula is, instead, "Be it therefore enacted by the Oireachtas as follows:—".

== Committees ==
The Oireachtas has a number of joint committees that include members of both houses. There are currently fifteen of these:

- Joint Committee on Agriculture and the Marine
- Joint Committee on Children, Disability, Equality and Integration
- Joint Committee on Climate Action
- Joint Committee on Education, Further and Higher Education, Research, Innovation and Science
- Joint Committee on Enterprise, Trade and Employment
- Joint Committee on European Union Affairs
- Joint Committee on Finance, Public Expenditure and Reform, and Taoiseach
- Joint Committee on Foreign Affairs and Defence
- Joint Committee on Health
- Joint Committee on Housing, Local Government and Heritage
- Joint Committee on the Implementation of the Good Friday Agreement
- Joint Committee on Justice
- Joint Committee on Media, Tourism, Arts, Culture, Sport and the Gaeltacht
- Joint Committee on Social Protection, Community and Rural Development and the Islands
- Joint Committee on Transport and Communications Networks
- Working Group of Committee Chairmen

== Houses of the Oireachtas Commission ==
While each house is empowered to organise its own business, they have always co-operated in practical matters arising from the fact that they share Leinster House as a common building complex. The Houses of the Oireachtas Commission was established by statute in 2003 to provide a formal structure for this, which was previously done by a joint committee. Non-political support staff, such as ushers and the English–Irish translation staff, are employed by this Commission and treated as part of the civil service of the State. The Commission's chairperson and chief executive are the Ceann Comhairle and clerk of the Dáil respectively; other members are the Cathaoirleach of the Seanad, one appointed by the Minister for Finance, four by the Dáil, and three by the Seanad. The Commission, through the translation department, is responsible for periodic updates to An Caighdeán Oifigiúil, the official standard form of the Irish language.

== Predecessors ==
The earliest parliament in Ireland was the Parliament of Ireland, which was founded in the thirteenth century as the supreme legislative body of the lordship of Ireland and was in existence until 1801. This parliament governed the English-dominated part of Ireland, which at first was limited to Dublin and surrounding cities, but later grew to include the entire island. The Irish Parliament was, from the passage of Poynings' Law in 1494 until its repeal in 1782, subordinate to the Parliament of England (from 1707 the Parliament of Great Britain). This Parliament consisted of the King of Ireland (who was the same person as the King of England), a House of Lords and a House of Commons. After the Constitution of 1782 was passed by both the Irish Parliament and the Parliament of Great Britain, the Irish Parliament had increased legislative and judicial independence from the Kingdom of Great Britain and had greater control over the Royal Irish Army. It was known as Grattan's Parliament after Henry Grattan, leader of the Irish Patriot Party. In 1800 the Irish Parliament approved its own abolition when it enacted the Act of Union, which came into effect from 1 January 1801.

The next legislature to exist in Ireland came into being in 1919. This was a unicameral parliament established by Irish republicans, known as Dáil Éireann. This revolutionary Dáil was notionally a legislature for the whole island of Ireland. In 1920, in parallel to the Dáil, the British government created a home rule legislature called the Parliament of Southern Ireland. However, this parliament was boycotted by most Irish politicians. It was made up of the King, the House of Commons of Southern Ireland and the Senate of Southern Ireland. The Parliament of Southern Ireland was formally abolished in 1922, with the establishment of the Oireachtas under the Constitution of the Irish Free State.

The Oireachtas of the Irish Free State consisted of the King (represented by a Governor-General) and two houses: Dáil Éireann (described as a "Chamber of Deputies") and Seanad Éireann. However, the Free State Senate was abolished in May 1936 and the role of the monarch was removed in December 1936. The modern Oireachtas came into being on 29 December 1937, on the adoption of the Constitution of Ireland.

== Broadcasting ==
The first Oireachtas radio and television broadcasts were of ceremonial addresses from dignitaries, beginning with that of John F. Kennedy during his 1963 state visit. Regular radio broadcasting of edited Oireachtas proceedings began in October 1986, although budget statements had already been broadcast live. Television coverage of Dáil, Seanad, and committee proceedings began in 1990, 1991, and 1993 respectively. Since 2005 the proceedings of both houses have been made available over the internet by HEAnet and the eDemocracy Unit of the Office of the Houses of the Oireachtas.

Oireachtas TV is a digital television channel in Ireland. It broadcasts Committee and Houses and other parliament proceedings following its establishment under the Broadcasting Act 2009. On 15 November 2011, it began broadcasting a pilot service on UPC Ireland. On 22 September 2014, the Houses launched the dedicated television channel Oireachtas TV, bringing unfiltered access to the parliamentary process to over one million households nationwide. The service is available free of charge on UPC Channel 207 and Sky Channel 574.

In 2012, the Oireachtas launched its first e-consultation.

== Northern Ireland representation ==
Although, as adopted in 1937, Article 3 of the constitution asserted the "right of the parliament and government established by this constitution to exercise jurisdiction" over the whole of Ireland, it also provided that pending the "re-integration of the national territory" Acts of the Oireachtas would not apply to Northern Ireland. Therefore, no serious attempts have been made for the representation of Northern Ireland in the Dáil. As Taoiseach, Éamon de Valera, while a staunch opponent of partition, and who had been elected to represent a Northern constituency in the First Dáil, did not pursue the idea of seats in the Dáil for Northern Ireland, on the grounds that this would amount to representation "without taxation or responsibility". Beginning with Seamus Mallon in 1982, one or more from Northern Ireland have been included among the eleven Senators nominated by the Taoiseach after most elections.

Sinn Féin has advocated that Northern Ireland MLAs, MPs, and MEPs should have the right to participate in Dáil debates, if not vote. In 2005 the Taoiseach, Bertie Ahern, proposed that Northern Ireland MPs should be able to address a committee of the whole Dáil. However, Fine Gael, the Labour Party, and Ahern's coalition partners, the Progressive Democrats, all opposed the idea, as did the Green Party, the Socialist Party and some Oireachtas members from Fianna Fáil. Only Sinn Féin, supported it, while the more moderate Social Democratic and Labour Party (SDLP) described it as a step forward. The proposal was also criticised widely in the media, with an editorial in The Irish Times, declaring that: "The overwhelming democratic imperative is that the institutions of this State should represent and serve the people of the State." From 2011, Northern Ireland MEPs had the same automatic right as MEPs from the Republic to participate in meetings of the Seanad's European committee, whereas other MEPs require an invitation. This ended in 2020 when the United Kingdom left the EU, which consequently meant all UK MEPs left office.

== See also ==
- List of acts of the Oireachtas
- List of addresses to the Oireachtas
- Records of members of the Oireachtas
- Families in the Oireachtas
