= Ceann Comhairle =

Presiding officer of Dáil Éireann

Ceann Comhairle of Dáil Éireann
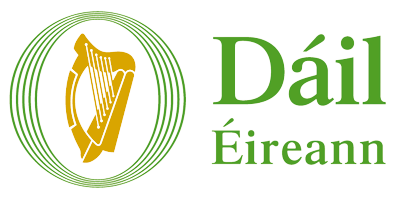

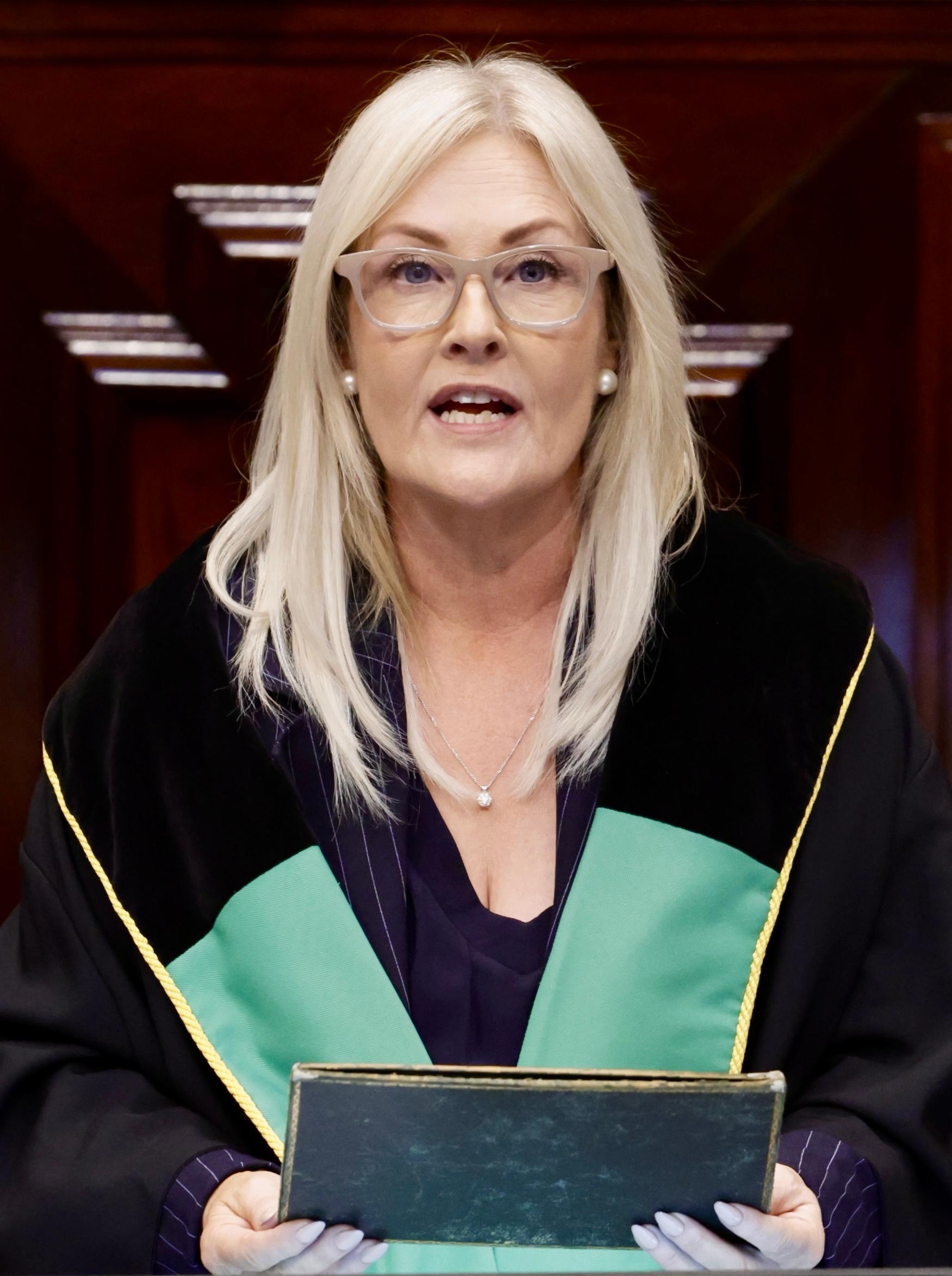
- Incumbent; Verona Murphy since 18 December 2024
- Dáil Éireann
- Status: Presiding officer
- Member of: Council of State; Presidential Commission; Comhairle na Míre Gaile; Commission for Public Service Appointments; Committee of Parliamentary Privileges and Standards
- Seat: Leinster House, Dublin
- Nominator: At least seven TDs at start of a new term after a general election
- Appointer: Dáil Éireann following election by secret ballot.
- Term length: Until the end of the current Dáil. No term limits are imposed on the office.
- Constituting instrument: Article 15 – Constitution of Ireland
- Inaugural holder: Cathal Brugha
- Formation: 21 January 1919
- Deputy: Leas-Cheann Comhairle
- Salary: €227,448 annually
- Website: Official website

The Ceann Comhairle (Irish: [ˌcaːn̪ˠ ˈkoːɾˠl̠ʲə]; "Head of [the] Council"; plural usually Cinn Comhairle [ˌciːn̠ʲ ˈkoːɾˠl̠ʲə]) is the chairperson (or speaker) of Dáil Éireann, the lower house of the Oireachtas (parliament) of Ireland. The person who holds the position is elected by members of the Dáil from among their number in the first session after each general election. The Ceann Comhairle since 18 December 2024 has been Verona Murphy, independent TD. The Leas-Cheann Comhairle since 19 February 2025 has been John McGuinness (Fianna Fáil). To protect the neutrality of the chair, an incumbent Ceann Comhairle is deemed automatically re-elected as a TD at a general election, unless they are retiring.

== Overview ==
The Ceann Comhairle is expected to observe strict impartiality. Despite this, a government usually tries to select a member of its own political party for the position, if it has enough deputies to allow that choice. In order to protect the neutrality of the chair, the Constitution of Ireland provides that an incumbent Ceann Comhairle does not seek re-election as a Teachta Dála (Deputy to the Dáil), but rather is deemed automatically to have been re-elected by their constituency at that general election, unless they are retiring. (Note: Article 16.6 of the constitution requires that "provision shall be made by law" such that the Ceann Comhairle "be deemed without any actual election to be elected a member of Dáil Éireann". This is provided for in section 36 of the Electoral Act 1992.Electoral Act 1992, s. 36: Re-election of outgoing Chairman of Dáil (No. 23 of 1992, s. 36). Act of the Oireachtas. Archived from the original on 8 December 2015. Retrieved from Irish Statute Book on 4 December 2015.) As a consequence, the constituency that an incumbent Ceann Comhairle represents elects one fewer TD in a general election than its usual entitlement, but still has the same number of TDs. Under standing orders, no member of the government or Minister of State may act as Ceann Comhairle or Leas-Cheann Comhairle.

The Ceann Comhairle does not take part in debates, nor do they vote except in the event of a tie. In this event, they generally vote in accordance with the parliamentary conventions relating to the Speaker of the British House of Commons, which tend to amount to voting against motions. The Ceann Comhairle formally opens each day's sitting by reading the official prayer. The Ceann Comhairle is the sole judge of order in the house and has a number of special functions. Specifically, the Ceann Comhairle:

- Calls on members to speak. All speeches must be addressed to the Ceann Comhairle.
- Puts such questions to the house, and supervises and declares the results of divisions.
- Has authority to suppress disorder. To ensure obedience to their rulings the Ceann Comhairle may order members to withdraw from the Dáil or suspend an individual from the House for a period. In the case of great disorder, the Ceann Comhairle can suspend or adjourn the house.
- Rings a bell when deputies are out of order. The bell is a half-sized reproduction of the ancient bell of Lough Lene Castle found at Castle Island, Lough Lene, Castlepollard, County Westmeath in 1881 and now in the National Museum. The reproduction was presented in 1931 by the widow of Bryan Cooper, a former TD.

The Ceann Comhairle is an ex officio member of the Presidential Commission, the Council of State, and the Commission for Public Service Appointments.

Since the 1937 Constitution, the Ceann Comhairle has been an ex officio member of the Council of State, beginning with Frank Fahy. The earlier presiding officers never served on the Council of State: i.e. those of the Revolutionary Dáil (1919–1922: Cathal Brugha, George Noble Plunkett, Eoin MacNeill, and Michael Hayes) and the Free State Dáil (1922–1936: Hayes again, before Fahy).

== History ==
The position of Ceann Comhairle was created on the first day of the Dáil on 21 January 1919, when it was first established as a breakaway revolutionary parliament. The first Ceann Comhairle was Cathal Brugha, who served for only one day, presiding over the Dáil's first meeting, before leaving the post to become President of Dáil Éireann. The office was continued under the 1922–1937 Irish Free State, the constitution of which referred to the office-holder as the "Chairman of Dáil Éireann". The practice of automatically re-electing the Ceann Comhairle in a general election was introduced by a constitutional amendment in 1927. The outgoing Ceann Comhairle is returned at the election for their former party.

Following the abolition on 11 December 1936 of the office of Governor-General, the Ceann Comhairle was assigned some of the former office's ceremonial functions, including signing bills into law and convening and dissolving the Dáil. These powers were transferred to the new office of President of Ireland when a new Constitution came into force on 29 December 1937, being carried out by the Presidential Commission, which included the Ceann Comhairle, until the first president entered office on 25 June 1938. The new Constitution retained the position of Ceann Comhairle and the practice of automatic re-election.

Patrick Hogan retired due to ill health in 1967, and died in 1969 before the following election. Joseph Brennan died in office in 1980.

John O'Donoghue resigned the office in 2009 after an expenses scandal. As an ordinary TD he was no longer entitled to be returned automatically at 2011 general election, in which he lost his seat.

The Ceann Comhairle was first elected by secret ballot in 2016.

Following the 2024 general election, a group of Independent TDs requested that Fianna Fáil and Fine Gael support Verona Murphy becoming Ceann Comhairle as a condition of their support for government formation. The request was accepted and with their backing, Murphy won the 2024 Ceann Comhairle election. In doing so, Murphy became the first woman to ever hold the role. However, the move was criticised, particularly by the Opposition parties, as traditionally the Ceann Comhairle is supposed to neutral and unaligned in the Dáil. Critics suggested Murphy would have to be loyal to the government if she owed her position to their support.

On 1 April 2025, a vote of confidence was held in a Ceann Comhairle for the first time. This arose in response to the speaking rights dispute. The motion of confidence in Verona Murphy was agreed by a vote of 96 to 71, with 2 abstentions.

== Rules for election ==
Under the rules for the election of the Ceann Comhairle, introduced during the 31st Dáil, candidates must be nominated by at least seven other members of Dáil Éireann. Each member may nominate only one candidate. Nominations must be submitted to the Clerk of the Dáil by not later than 6 p.m. on the day before the first day the Dáil meets after the general election in order to be valid, but may be withdrawn at any time up to the close of nominations.

If more than one candidate is nominated, the Dáil will vote by secret ballot in order of preference after the candidates' speeches, which may not exceed five minutes, with an absolute majority required for victory. If no candidate wins a majority on first preferences, the individual with the fewest votes will be eliminated and their votes redistributed in accordance with their next highest preference, under the alternative vote voting system. Eliminations and redistributions will continue until one member receives the requisite absolute majority. Then, the House will vote on a formal motion to appoint the member in question to the position of Ceann Comhairle. The Clerk of the Dáil will be the presiding officer of the House during the election process.

== List of office-holders ==
=== Ceann Comhairle ===
For each Ceann Comhairle, this tables lists the number of the Dáil, the period in which they held office, their constituencies and their political affiliation immediately prior to their appointment.

Dáil	Name (Birth–Death)	Portrait	Term of office		Party	Constituency	Ref
1st	Cathal Brugha (1874–1922)		21 January 1919	22 January 1919	Sinn Féin	Waterford County	
1st	George Noble Plunkett (1851–1948) (Note: George Noble Plunkett briefly chaired the Dáil on 22 January 1919. Seán T. O'Kelly was elected Ceann Comhairle later in the same day.)		22 January 1919	22 January 1919	Sinn Féin	Roscommon North	
1st	Seán T. O'Kelly (1882–1966)		22 January 1919	16 August 1921	Sinn Féin	Dublin College Green	
2nd	Eoin MacNeill (1867–1945)		16 August 1921	9 September 1922	Sinn Féin (Pro-Treaty)	Londonderry; National University (Note: MacNeill was returned for seats in both the House of Commons of Northern Ireland and House of Commons of Southern Ireland.)	
3rd	Michael Hayes (1889–1976)		9 September 1922	9 March 1932	Cumann na nGaedheal	National University (Note: Hayes was also returned for Dublin South in 1922 but chose to vacate that seat.)	
4th	Michael Hayes (1889–1976)		9 September 1922	9 March 1932	Cumann na nGaedheal	National University	
5th	Michael Hayes (1889–1976)		9 September 1922	9 March 1932	Cumann na nGaedheal	National University	
6th	Michael Hayes (1889–1976)		9 September 1922	9 March 1932	Cumann na nGaedheal	National University	
7th	Frank Fahy (1879–1953)		9 March 1932	13 June 1951	Fianna Fáil	Galway	
8th	Frank Fahy (1879–1953)		9 March 1932	13 June 1951	Fianna Fáil	Galway	
9th	Frank Fahy (1879–1953)		9 March 1932	13 June 1951	Fianna Fáil	Galway East	
10th	Frank Fahy (1879–1953)		9 March 1932	13 June 1951	Fianna Fáil	Galway East	
11th	Frank Fahy (1879–1953)		9 March 1932	13 June 1951	Fianna Fáil	Galway East	
12th	Frank Fahy (1879–1953)		9 March 1932	13 June 1951	Fianna Fáil	Galway East	
13th	Frank Fahy (1879–1953)		9 March 1932	13 June 1951	Fianna Fáil	Galway South	
14th	Patrick Hogan (1885–1969)		13 June 1951	7 November 1967	Labour	Clare	
15th	Patrick Hogan (1885–1969)		13 June 1951	7 November 1967	Labour	Clare	
16th	Patrick Hogan (1885–1969)		13 June 1951	7 November 1967	Labour	Clare	
17th	Patrick Hogan (1885–1969)		13 June 1951	7 November 1967	Labour	Clare	
18th	Patrick Hogan (1885–1969)		13 June 1951	7 November 1967	Labour	Clare	
18th	Cormac Breslin (1902–1978)		14 November 1967 (Note: Appointed temporarily on 7 November 1967 and elected permanently on 14 November 1967)	14 March 1973	Fianna Fáil	Donegal South-West	
19th	Cormac Breslin (1902–1978)		14 November 1967	14 March 1973	Fianna Fáil	Donegal–Leitrim	
20th	Seán Treacy (1923–2018)		14 March 1973	5 July 1977	Labour	Tipperary South	
21st	Joseph Brennan (1913–1980)		5 July 1977	13 July 1980	Fianna Fáil	Donegal	
21st	Pádraig Faulkner (1918–2012)		16 October 1980 (Note: Elected temporarily on 15 October 1980 and permanently the following day.)	30 June 1981	Fianna Fáil	Louth	
22nd	John O'Connell (1927–2013)		30 June 1981	14 December 1982	Independent	Dublin South-Central	
23rd	John O'Connell (1927–2013)		30 June 1981	14 December 1982	Independent	Dublin South-Central	
24th	Tom Fitzpatrick (1918–2006)		14 December 1982	10 March 1987	Fine Gael	Cavan–Monaghan	
25th	Seán Treacy (1923–2018)		10 March 1987	26 June 1997	Independent	Tipperary South	
26th	Seán Treacy (1923–2018)		10 March 1987	26 June 1997	Independent	Tipperary South	
27th	Seán Treacy (1923–2018)		10 March 1987	26 June 1997	Independent	Tipperary South	
28th	Séamus Pattison (1936–2018)		26 June 1997	6 June 2002	Labour	Carlow–Kilkenny	
29th	Rory O'Hanlon (1934–2026)		6 June 2002	14 June 2007	Fianna Fáil	Cavan–Monaghan	
30th	John O'Donoghue (born 1956)		14 June 2007	13 October 2009	Fianna Fáil	Kerry South	
30th	Séamus Kirk (born 1945)		13 October 2009	9 March 2011	Fianna Fáil	Louth	
31st	Seán Barrett (1944–2026)		9 March 2011	10 March 2016	Fine Gael	Dún Laoghaire	
32nd	Seán Ó Fearghaíl (born 1960)		10 March 2016 (2016 election) (2020 election)	18 December 2024	Fianna Fáil	Kildare South	
33rd	Seán Ó Fearghaíl (born 1960)		10 March 2016 (2016 election) (2020 election)	18 December 2024	Fianna Fáil	Kildare South	
34th	Verona Murphy (born 1971)		18 December 2024 (2024 election)	Incumbent	Independent	Wexford	

=== Leas-Cheann Comhairle ===
The Leas-Cheann Comhairle holds office as the deputy chairperson of Dáil Éireann under Article 15.9.1 of the constitution. In the absence of the Ceann Comhairle, the Leas-Cheann Comhairle deputises and performs the duties and exercises the authority of the Ceann Comhairle in Dáil proceedings. The Leas-Cheann Comhairle is also elected by secret ballot. The current Leas-Cheann Comhairle is Fianna Fáil TD John McGuinness. Traditionally, the position was reserved for an Opposition TD. The role carries the pay and status as a Minister of State.

Dáil	Name (Birth–Death)	Portrait	Term of office		Party	Constituency	Ref
1st	John J. O'Kelly (1872–1957)		1 April 1919	26 August 1921	Sinn Féin	Louth	
2nd	Brian O'Higgins (1882–1963)		26 August 1921	28 February 1922	Sinn Féin	Clare	
3rd	Pádraic Ó Máille (1878–1946)		6 December 1922	23 May 1927	Cumann na nGaedheal	Galway	
4th	Pádraic Ó Máille (1878–1946)		6 December 1922	23 May 1927	Cumann na nGaedheal	Galway	
5th	James Dolan (1884–1955)		1 July 1927	25 August 1927	Cumann na nGaedheal	Leitrim–Sligo	
6th	Patrick Hogan (1885–1969)		27 October 1927	8 March 1928	Labour	Clare	
6th	Daniel Morrissey (1895–1981)		2 May 1928	29 January 1932	Cumann na nGaedheal	Tipperary	
7th	Patrick Hogan (1885–1969)		15 March 1932	27 May 1938	Labour	Clare	
8th	Patrick Hogan (1885–1969)		15 March 1932	27 May 1938	Labour	Clare	
9th	Patrick Hogan (1885–1969)		15 March 1932	27 May 1938	Labour	Clare	
10th	Fionán Lynch (1889–1966)		5 July 1938	12 May 1939	Fine Gael	Kerry South	
10th	Eamonn O'Neill (1882–1954)		31 May 1939	31 May 1943	Fine Gael	Cork West	
11th	Daniel McMenamin (1882–1964)		20 October 1943	12 January 1948	Fine Gael	Donegal East	
12th	Daniel McMenamin (1882–1964)		20 October 1943	12 January 1948	Fine Gael	Donegal East	
13th	Patrick Hogan (1885–1969)		25 February 1948	7 May 1951	Labour	Clare	
14th	Cormac Breslin (1902–1978)		4 July 1951	7 November 1967	Fianna Fáil	Donegal West	
15th	Cormac Breslin (1902–1978)		4 July 1951	7 November 1967	Fianna Fáil	Donegal West	
16th	Cormac Breslin (1902–1978)		4 July 1951	7 November 1967	Fianna Fáil	Donegal West	
17th	Cormac Breslin (1902–1978)		4 July 1951	7 November 1967	Fianna Fáil	Donegal South-West	
18th	Cormac Breslin (1902–1978)		4 July 1951	7 November 1967	Fianna Fáil	Donegal South-West	
18th	Denis Jones (1906–1987)		15 November 1967	5 July 1977	Fine Gael	Limerick West	
19th	Denis Jones (1906–1987)		15 November 1967	5 July 1977	Fine Gael	Limerick West	
20th	Denis Jones (1906–1987)		15 November 1967	5 July 1977	Fine Gael	Limerick West	
21st	Seán Browne (1916–1996)		6 July 1977	30 June 1981	Fianna Fáil	Wexford	
22nd	Jim Tunney (1924–2002)		7 July 1981	14 December 1982	Fianna Fáil	Dublin North-West	
23rd	Jim Tunney (1924–2002)		7 July 1981	14 December 1982	Fianna Fáil	Dublin North-West	
24th	John Ryan (1927–2014)		15 December 1982	10 March 1987	Labour	Tipperary North	
25th	Jim Tunney (1924–2002)		24 March 1987	4 January 1993	Fianna Fáil	Dublin North-West	
26th	Jim Tunney (1924–2002)		24 March 1987	4 January 1993	Fianna Fáil	Dublin North-West	
27th	Joe Jacob (born 1939)		10 February 1993	26 June 1997	Fianna Fáil	Wicklow	
28th	Rory O'Hanlon (1934-2026)		9 July 1997	6 June 2002	Fianna Fáil	Cavan–Monaghan	
29th	Séamus Pattison (1936–2018)		18 June 2002	14 June 2007	Labour	Carlow–Kilkenny	
30th	Brendan Howlin (born 1956)		26 June 2007	9 March 2011	Labour	Wexford	
31st	Michael Kitt (born 1950)		31 March 2011	10 March 2016	Fianna Fáil	Galway East	
32nd	Pat "the Cope" Gallagher (born 1948)		7 July 2016	14 January 2020	Fianna Fáil	Donegal	
33rd	Catherine Connolly (born 1957)		23 July 2020	8 November 2024	Independent	Galway West	
34th	John McGuinness (born 1955)		19 February 2025	Incumbent	Fianna Fáil	Carlow–Kilkenny	

== See also ==
- Cathaoirleach (Chairperson of Seanad Éireann)
- Politics of the Republic of Ireland
- History of the Republic of Ireland
- Dáil Éireann (Irish Republic)
- Dáil Éireann (Irish Free State)
- Speaker of the Northern Ireland Assembly, who is referred to as Ceann Comhairle when Irish is spoken.
