= 2024 Ceann Comhairle election =

Parliamentary election in Ireland

- 18 December 2024
- Turnout: 99.4%
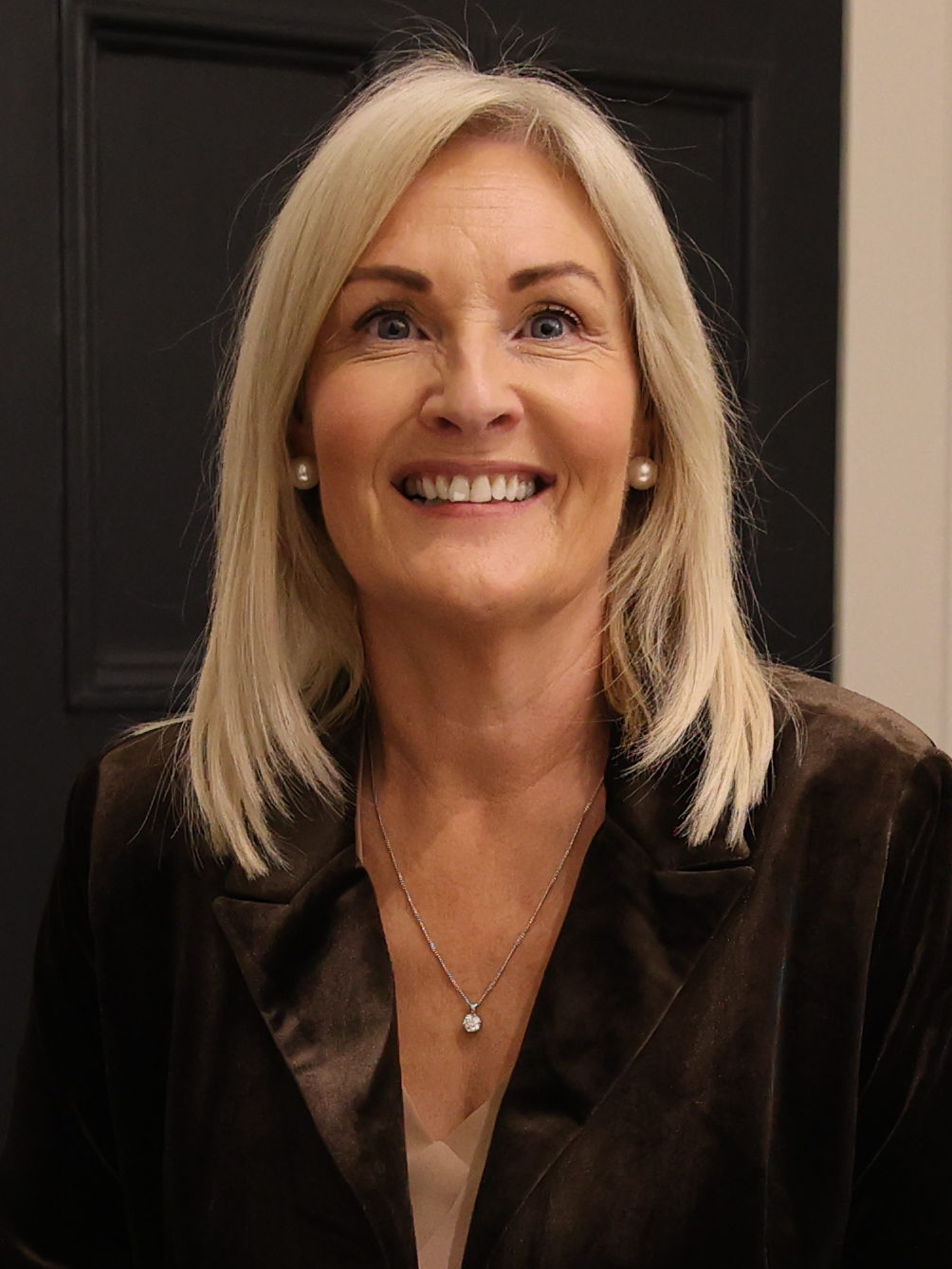

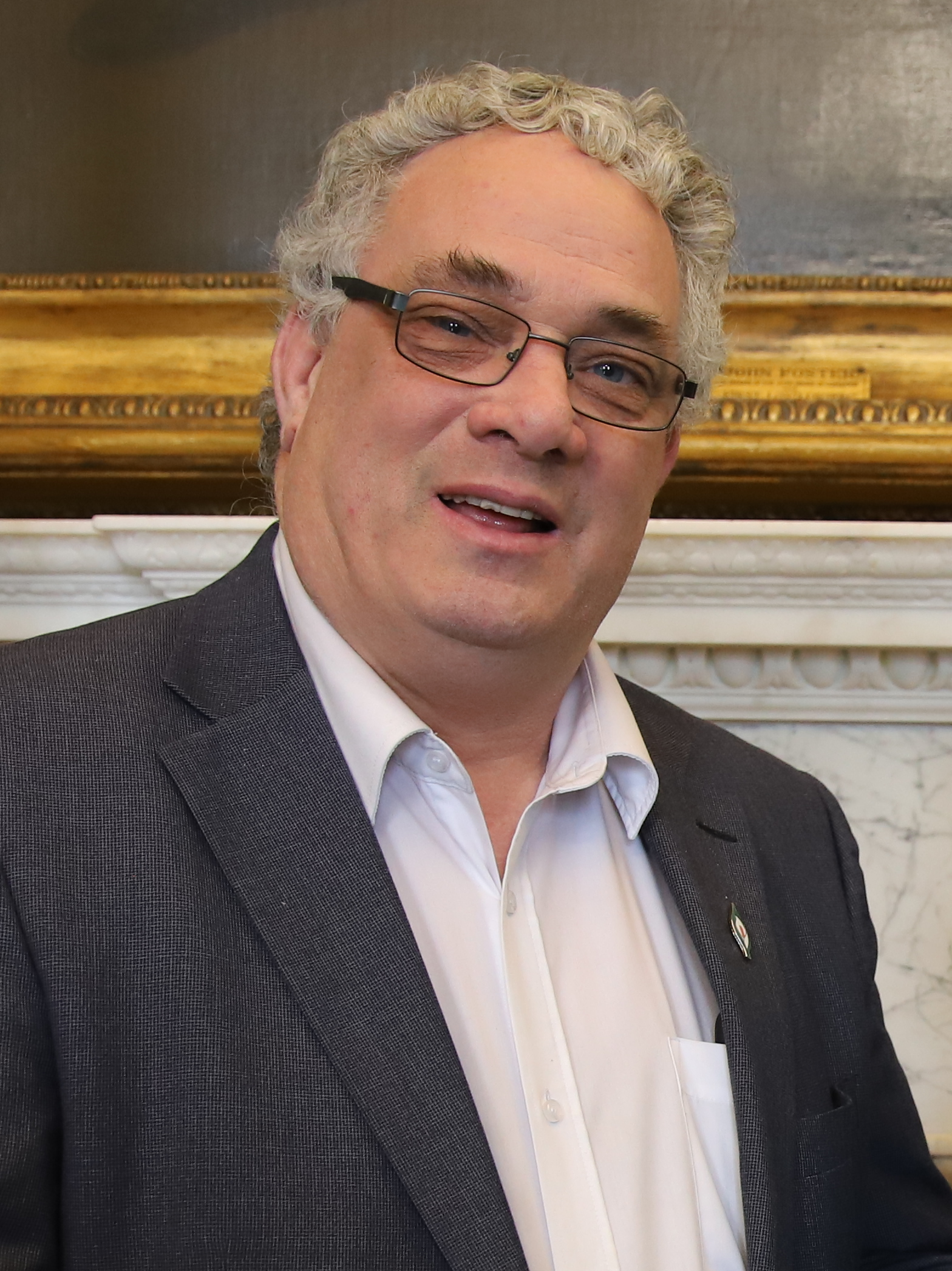

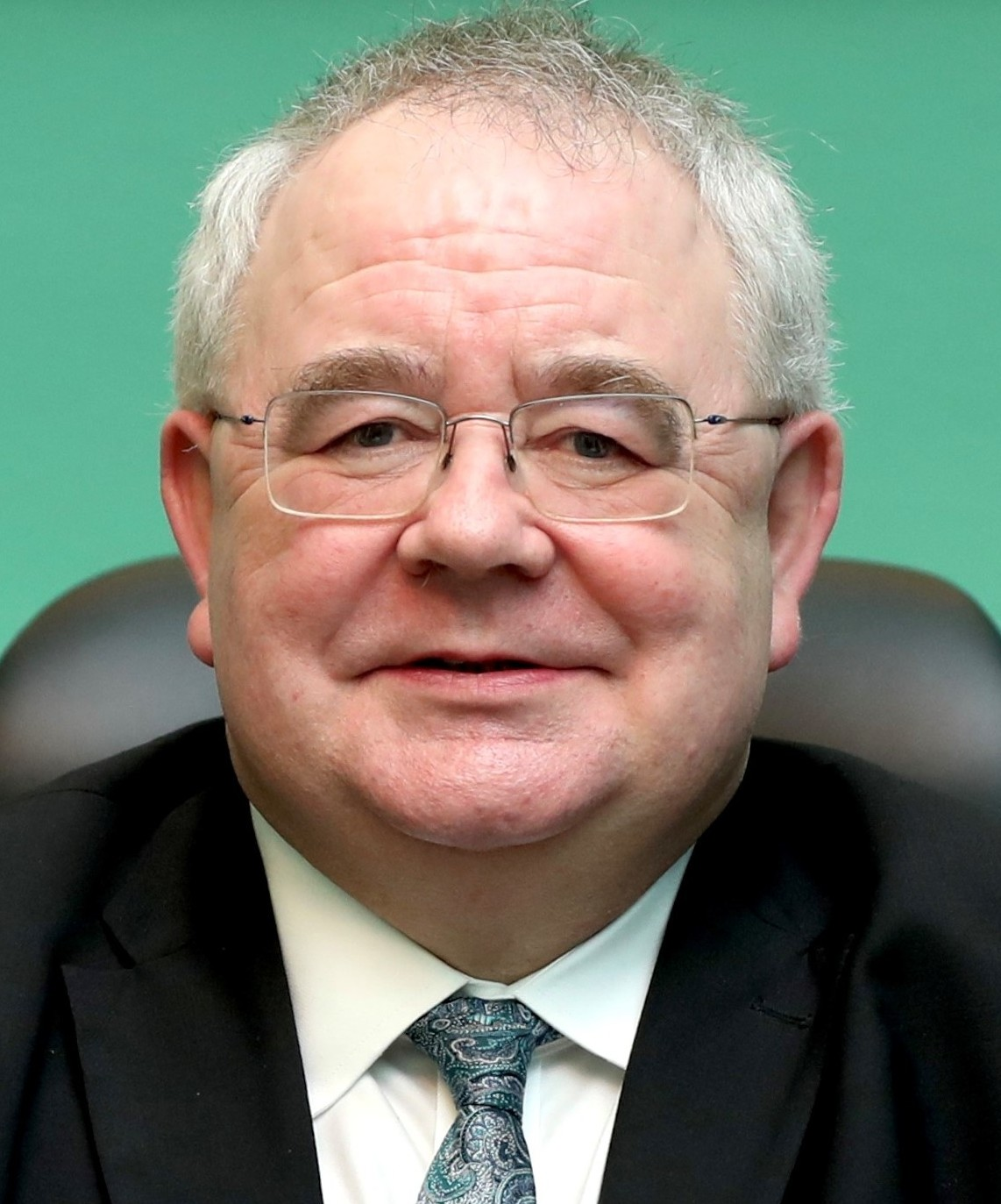

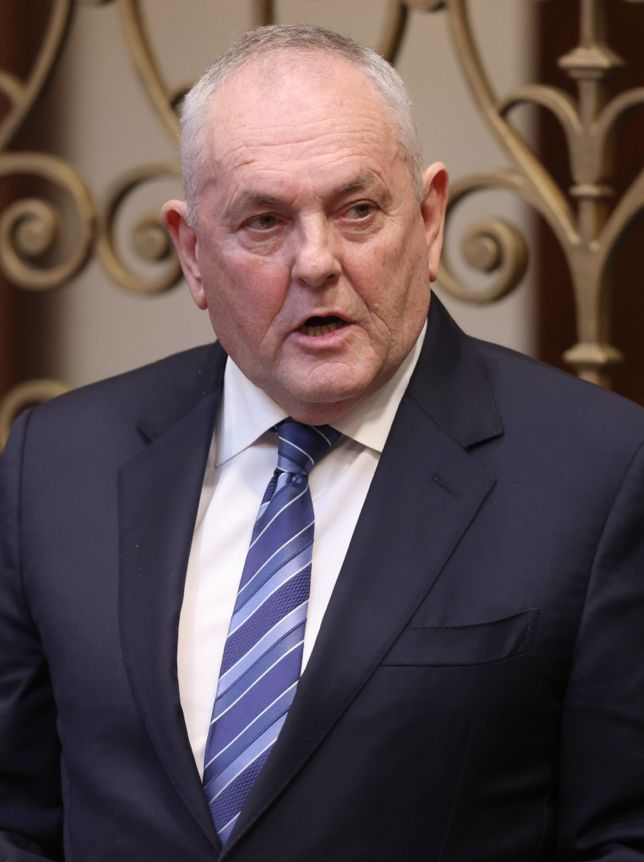
Nominee	Verona Murphy	Aengus Ó Snodaigh
Party	Independent	Sinn Féin
1st preference	76 (44.2%)	48 (27.9%)
2nd count	76 (44.2%)	54 (31.4%)
3rd count	89 (51.7%)	67 (39.0%)
Nominee	Seán Ó Fearghaíl	John McGuinness
Party	Fianna Fáil	Fianna Fáil
1st preference	27 (15.7%)	21 (12.2%)
2nd count	42 (24.4%)	Eliminated
3rd count	Eliminated
Ceann Comhairle before election
Seán Ó Fearghaíl
Fianna Fáil
Elected Ceann Comhairle
Verona Murphy
Independent

The 2024 election of the Ceann Comhairle took place on 18 December 2024 at the commencement of the 34th Dáil. It was the third election to be performed by secret ballot. Verona Murphy was elected to the position, the first woman to become Ceann Comhairle.

== Rules ==
Under the rules for the election of the Ceann Comhairle, introduced during the 31st Dáil, candidates must be nominated by at least seven other members of Dáil Éireann. Each member may nominate only one candidate. Nominations must be submitted to the Clerk of the Dáil by not later than 6 p.m. on the day before the first day the Dáil meets after the general election to be valid. For the 34th Dáil meeting after the 2024 general election, this date was 17 December 2024. Nominations may be withdrawn at any time up to the close of nominations.

If more than one candidate is nominated, the Dáil will vote by secret ballot in order of preference after the candidates' speeches, which may not exceed five minutes, with an absolute majority required for victory. If no candidate wins a majority on first preferences, the individual with the fewest votes will be eliminated and their votes redistributed in accordance with their next highest preference, under a voting system known as the alternative vote (described in Dáil standing orders as "the Proportional representation Single transferable vote system"). Eliminations and redistributions will continue until one member receives the requisite absolute majority. Then, the House will vote on a formal motion to appoint the member in question to the position of Ceann Comhairle. The Clerk of the Dáil will be the presiding officer of the House during the election process.

== Candidates ==
Fianna Fáil TD Seán Ó Fearghaíl, Ceann Comhairle of the 33rd Dáil, sought re-election. The other candidates were: Fianna Fáil TD John McGuinness; independent TD Verona Murphy; and Sinn Féin TD Aengus Ó Snodaigh.

Verona Murphy was nominated by the Regional Group of independent TDs. The Fianna Fáil and Fine Gael parliamentary parties both backed Murphy.

== Result ==
2024 election: Ceann Comhairle
Party	Candidate	FPv%	Count		
Party	Candidate	FPv%	1	2	3
Independent	Verona Murphy	44.2	76	76	89
Sinn Féin	Aengus Ó Snodaigh	27.9	48	54	67
Fianna Fáil	Seán Ó Fearghaíl	15.7	27	42	
Fianna Fáil	John McGuinness	12.2	21		
Electorate: 174 Valid: 172 Spoilt: 1 (0.6%) Quota: 87 Turnout: 99.4%

== Leas-Cheann Comhairle election ==
2025 Leas-Cheann Comhairle election
- 19 February 2025
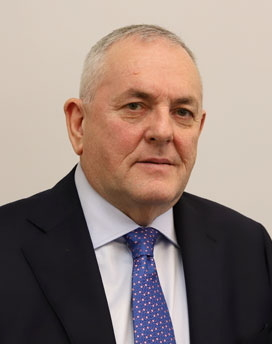

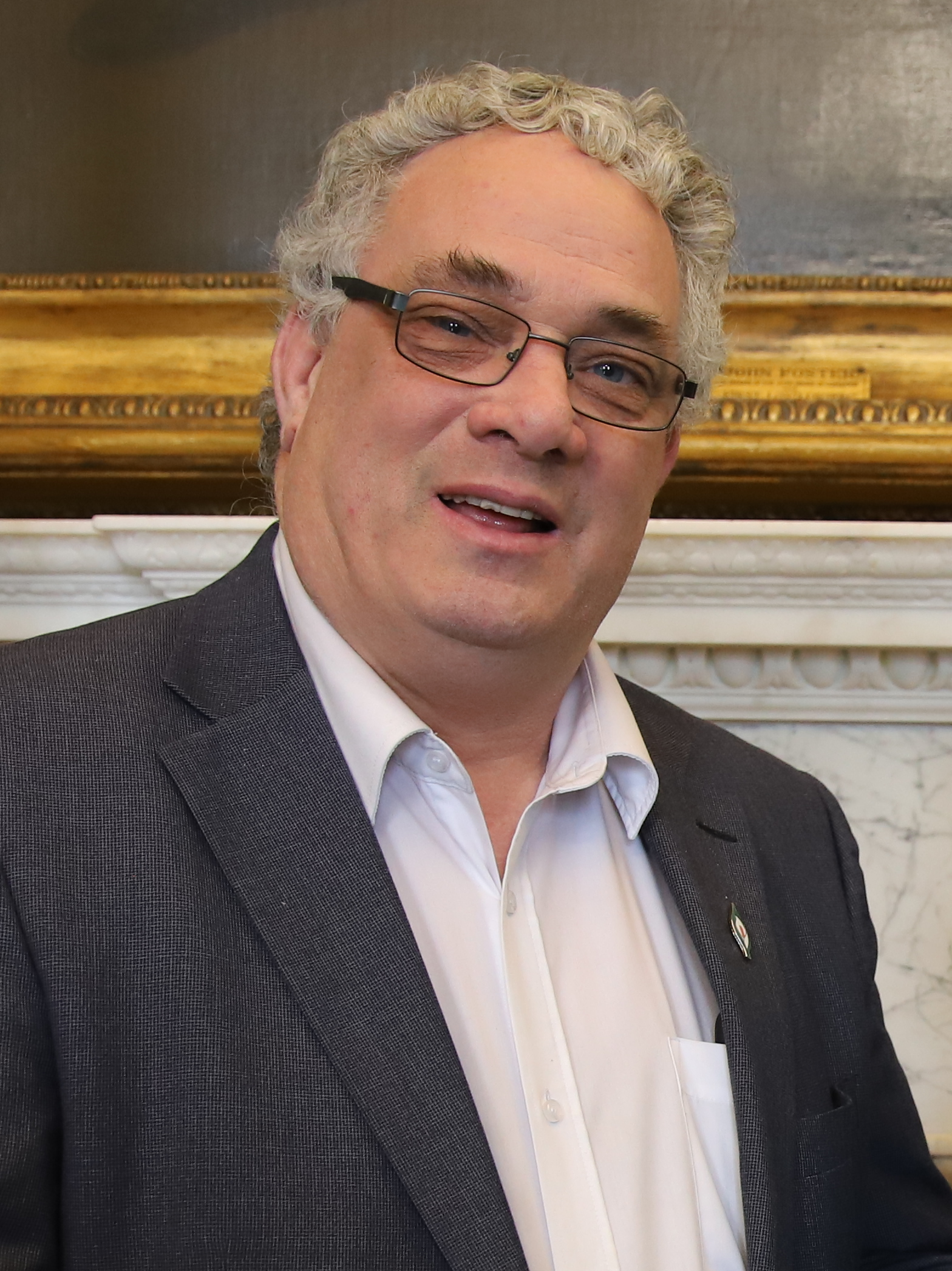
Nominee	John McGuinness	Aengus Ó Snodaigh
Party	Fianna Fáil	Sinn Féin
1st preference	96 (59.3%)	66 (40.7%)
Leas-Cheann Comhairle before election
Catherine Connolly
Independent
Elected Leas-Cheann Comhairle
John McGuinness
Fianna Fáil

An election for the Leas-Cheann Comhairle (deputy chairperson) of Dáil Éireann took place on 19 February 2025.

Incumbent Catherine Connolly did not seek re-election. Fianna Fáil's John McGuinness was selected as the candidate of the government. Sinn Féin's Aengus Ó Snodaigh was also selected as a candidate. McGuinness was elected on the first count with 96 votes to Ó Snodaigh's 66.
