= Dáil Éireann =

Lower house of the Oireachtas (Irish parliament)

Coordinates: 53.34055°N 6.254021°W

- 34th Dáil
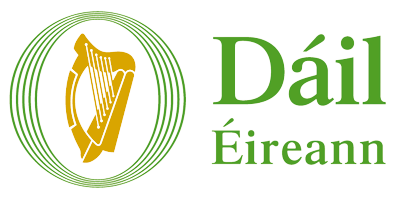

Type
- Type: Lower house of the Oireachtas
- Term limits: None

History
- Established: 29 December 1937 (Modern form)
- Preceded by: Dáil Éireann (Irish Free State)

Leadership
- Ceann Comhairle: Verona Murphy since 18 December 2024
- Leas-Cheann Comhairle: John McGuinness, FF since 19 February 2025
- Taoiseach: Micheál Martin, FF since 23 January 2025
- Tánaiste: Simon Harris, FG since 23 January 2025
- Government Chief Whip: Mary Butler, FF since 23 January 2025
- Deputy Chief Whip: Hildegarde Naughton, FG since 23 January 2025
- Leader of the Opposition: Mary Lou McDonald, SF since 23 January 2025

Structure
- Seats: 174
- Political groups: Government (90) Fianna Fáil (48) Fine Gael (38) Independent (4) Supported by (3) Independent (3) Opposition (80) Sinn Féin (39) Social Democrats (12) Labour (11) Independent Group (7) (Note: Technical group formed for parliamentary speaking rights. This is not a political alliance, but a parliamentary group.) Independent Ireland (4) Aontú (2) Independent (1) Inds. and Smaller Parties Group (7) PBP–Solidarity (3) Green (1) 100% Redress (1) Independents (2) (Note: Includes Séamus Healy who is a member of the Workers and Unemployed Action party but was elected as an independent candidate.) Independent (4) Ceann Comhairle Ceann Comhairle (1)
- Committees: 5: Business; Members' Interests of Dáil Éireann; Parliamentary Privileges and Oversight (Dáil); Public Accounts; Standing Orders and Dáil Reform
- Joint committees: 20: Agriculture, Food and the Marine; Autism; Children, Disability, Equality, Integration, and Youth; Disability Matters; Education, Further and Higher Education, Research, Innovation, and Science; Enterprise, Trade and Employment; Environment and Climate Action; European Union Affairs; Finance, Public Expenditure and Reform, and Taoiseach; Foreign Affairs and Defence; Gender Equality; Implementation of the Good Friday Agreement; Irish Language, Gaeltacht and the Irish-speaking Community; Health; Housing, Local Government and Heritage; Justice; Public Petitions; Social Protection, Community and Rural Development and the Islands; Transport and Communications; Tourism, Culture, Arts, Sport and Media
- Length of term: No more than 5 years (Note: Under the Constitution, the President may dissolve the Dáil on the Taoiseach's discretional advice; they may refuse this advice if the Taoiseach has lost the Dáil's confidence.)
- Authority: Articles 16−17, Constitution of Ireland
- Salary: €113,679 per year plus expenses

Elections
- Voting system: Proportional representation (single transferable vote)
- Last election: 29 November 2024
- Next election: By January 2030
- Redistricting: Advisory recommendations made by the Electoral Commission

Meeting place
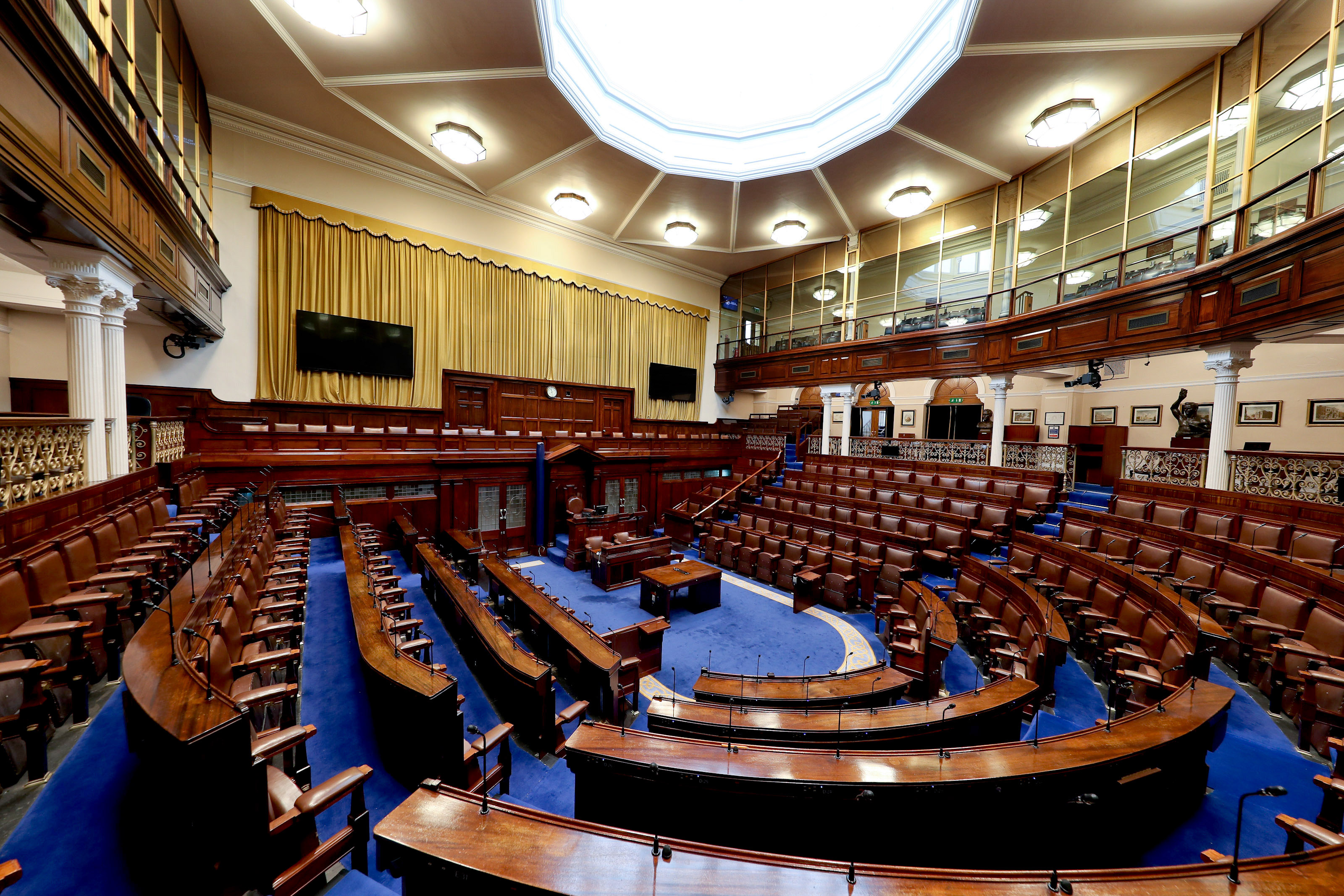
- Dáil Chamber; Leinster House, Kildare Street, Dublin

Website
- www.oireachtas.ie

Constitution
- Constitution of Ireland

Rules
- Dáil Éireann – Standing Orders Relative to Public Business 2025

Dáil Éireann (/dɑːl ˈɛərən/; Irish: [ˌd̪ˠaːlʲ ˈeːɾʲən̪ˠ], lit. 'Assembly of Ireland') is the lower house and principal chamber of the Oireachtas, which also includes the president of Ireland and a senate called Seanad Éireann. It consists of 174 members, each known as a Teachta Dála (plural Teachtaí Dála, commonly abbreviated as TDs). TDs represent 43 constituencies and are directly elected for terms not exceeding five years, on the system of proportional representation using the single transferable vote (PR-STV). Its powers are similar to those of lower houses under many other bicameral parliamentary systems and it is by far the dominant branch of the Oireachtas. Subject to the limits imposed by the Constitution of Ireland, it has the power to pass any law it wishes, and to nominate and remove the Taoiseach (head of government). Since 1922, it has met in Leinster House in Dublin.

The Dáil took its current form when the 1937 Constitution was adopted, but it maintains continuity with the First Dáil established in 1919.

== Composition ==
The Dáil has 174 members. The number is set within the limits of the Constitution of Ireland, which sets a minimum ratio of one member per 20,000 of the population, and a maximum of one per 30,000. Under current legislation, members are directly elected for terms not exceeding five years by the people of Ireland under a system of proportional representation known as the single transferable vote. Currently every Dáil constituency elects three, four or five TDs.

Membership of the Dáil is open to Irish citizens who are 21 or older. A member of the Dáil is a Teachta Dála and is known generally as a TD or Deputy.

The Dáil electorate consists of Irish and British citizens over 18 years of age who are registered to vote in Ireland. Under the Constitution a general election for Dáil Éireann must occur once in every seven years, but an earlier maximum of five years is set by the Electoral Act 1992. The Taoiseach (head of government or prime minister) can, at any time, make a request to the president to dissolve the Dáil, in which case a general election must occur within thirty days. The President may refuse to grant the dissolution to a Taoiseach who has ceased to retain the support of a majority in the Dáil; to date, no request for a dissolution has been refused.

=== Elections ===
The STV electoral system broadly produces proportional representation in the Dáil. The low district magnitude of the constituencies used, however, usually gives a small advantage to the larger parties and under-represents smaller parties. Since the 1990s the norm has been coalition governments. Prior to 1989, single-party governments by Fianna Fáil were common. The multi-seat constituencies required by STV mean that candidates must often compete for election with others from the same party. This system offers wide voter choice but is accused by some of producing TDs who are excessively parochial. By-elections occur under the alternative vote system. Proposals to amend the constitution to change to the first-past-the-post system were rejected in referendums in 1959 and in 1968.

Currently every Dáil constituency elects three, four or five TDs. The constitution specifies that no constituency may return fewer than three TDs but does not specify any upper limit to constituency magnitude. However, statute specifies a maximum of five seats per constituency. The constitution requires that constituency boundaries be reviewed at least once in every twelve years, so that boundaries may be redrawn to accommodate changes in population. Boundary changes are drafted by the Electoral Commission − which from 2023 replaced a judge-led Constituency Commission appointed for each review − and its recommendations are implemented by law. Malapportionment is forbidden by the constitution. Under the Constitution, the commission is required to refer to the most recent Census when considering boundary changes.

=== Number of members ===
Number of members
Dáil	Election	TDs
1st	1918	105
2nd	1921	180
3rd	1922	128
4th	1923	153
5th	Jun. 1927	153
6th	Sep. 1927	153
7th	1932	153
8th	1933	153
9th	1937	138
10th	1938	138
11th	1943	138
12th	1944	138
13th	1948	147
14th	1951	147
15th	1954	147
16th	1957	147
17th	1961	144
18th	1965	144
19th	1969	144
20th	1973	144
21st	1977	148
22nd	1981	166
23rd	Feb. 1982	166
24th	Nov. 1982	166
25th	1987	166
26th	1989	166
27th	1992	166
28th	1997	166
29th	2002	166
30th	2007	166
31st	2011	166
32nd	2016	158
33rd	2020	160
34th	2024	174

There are currently 174 TDs in the Dáil. This figure was provided by the Electoral (Amendment) Act 2023 and has been in place since the 2024 general election. This follows a recommendation of the Electoral Commission in August 2023. This gives an average representation of 29,593 people per TD, based on the 2022 census.

=== Layout ===
The Dáil chamber has confrontational benches but the end segment is curved to create a partial hemicycle. The government TDs sit on the left of the Ceann Comhairle, with the main opposition party on their right. The Chamber was adapted for use as a Parliament from its former use as a lecture theatre.

== Duration ==
The First Dáil was established on 21 January 1919 as the single-chamber parliament of the Irish Republic. One of the first actions of the Dáil was to ratify a constitution, commonly known as the Dáil Constitution. As a provisional constitution it made no reference to the length of the term of each Dáil. The First and Second Dáil existed under the provisions of this constitution. Neither was recognised by the British government or the governments of other countries as the lawful parliament of Ireland.

On 6 December 1922, following the signing of the 1921 Anglo-Irish Treaty which brought the Irish War of Independence to an end, the single chamber Dáil became the lower house of a new bicameral Oireachtas, the parliament of the newly established Irish Free State.

Article 28 of the Constitution of the Irish Free State (1922) set the maximum term for the Dáil at four years. This was amended in 1927 from four years to six years "or such shorter period as may be fixed by legislation". Later that same year, this period was fixed in law as a duration of "five years reckoned from the date of the first meeting of Dáil Éireann after the last previous dissolution".

On 29 December 1937, on the coming into force of the new Constitution of Ireland, the Irish Free State ceased to exist and was replaced by a new state called Ireland. Article 16.5 of the 1937 Constitution states, "Dáil Éireann shall not continue for a longer period than seven years from the date of its first meeting: a shorter period may be fixed by law". The period in law remained at five years. Since the coming into force of the 1937 constitution, no Irish government has proposed changing the maximum term of the Dáil, which still remains five years and was reconfirmed by legislation in 1992, which stated, "The same Dáil shall not continue for a longer period than five years from the date of its first meeting". Consequently, the maximum term for the Dáil is five years from the date it first met following the last general election.

== Dissolution ==
Article 16.3.2° of the Constitution of Ireland (1937) provides that an election for the membership of Dáil Éireann must take place no later than 30 days after a dissolution of the current Dáil. Article 16.4.2° requires that the newly elected Dáil Éireann must convene no later than 30 days after the election. As such, the maximum period of time between a dissolution of Dáil Éireann before a general election and the meeting of the new Dáil after a general election is 60 days.

The procedure and timetable for the dissolution of Dáil Éireann, pursuant to a general election, and the date for the reassembly of the newly elected Dáil, after the election, is set out in the Constitution of Ireland. Article 13.2.1° states that "Dáil Éireann shall be summoned and dissolved by the President on the advice of the Taoiseach". Therefore, the timing of a general election rests with the Taoiseach of the day.

Once so advised by the Taoiseach, the President issues a proclamation which specifies the date on which the current Dáil is dissolved, and the date on which the newly elected Dáil must first meet.

The timing for polling day in a general election is decided on by the Taoiseach. However, this is governed within a specified statutory framework. Once the presidential proclamation is issued, the Minister for Housing, Local Government and Heritage sets, by way of a ministerial order, the date and time of polling day in the election.

Section 39(1) of the Electoral Act 1992 states:

"Where the Dáil is dissolved, the Clerk of the Dáil shall, immediately upon the issue of the Proclamation dissolving the Dáil, issue a writ to each returning officer for a constituency directing him to cause an election to be held of the full number of members of the Dáil to serve in the Dáil for that constituency."

Section 96 of the Electoral Act 1992 (as amended) states:

"(1) A poll at a Dáil election—

(a) shall be taken on such day as shall be appointed by the Minister by order, being a day which (disregarding any excluded day) is not earlier than the eighteenth day or later than the twenty-fifth day next following the day on which the writ or writs for the election is or are issued,
(b) shall continue for such period, not being less than twelve hours, between the hours of 7 a.m. and 10.30 p.m. as may be fixed by the Minister by order, subject to the restriction that, in the case of a general election, he shall fix the same period for all constituencies.

(2) An order under this section shall be published in the Iris Oifigiúil as soon as may be after it is made."

For the purposes of the Act an "excluded day" means a day which is a Sunday, Good Friday or a day which is declared to be a public holiday by the Holidays (Employees) Act 1973, or a day which by virtue of a statute or proclamation is a public holiday.

Therefore, if the Dáil were dissolved on a Tuesday 1 February (in a non-leap year), and the writs for elections issued by the Clerk of the Dáil on that day, then the earliest date for polling day would be Tuesday 22 February (18 days later, excluding Sundays) and the latest date for polling would be Wednesday 2 March (25 days after, excluding Sundays), with polling stations being open for a minimum 12-hour period between the hours of 7am and 10.30pm on polling day (as set out in the ministerial order). In such a scenario, the latest date by which the newly elected Dáil must assemble would be Thursday 24 March (for a 22 February polling date), or Friday 1 April (for a 2 March polling date).

== Title ==
The name Dáil Éireann is taken from the Irish language but is the official title of the body in both English and Irish, including in both language versions of the Irish constitution. Since the Dáil was first established in 1919, it has also been described variously as a "National Assembly", a "Chamber of Deputies" and a "House of Representatives".

A dáil means a "meeting, tryst or encounter of any kind". Article 15 of the 1937 Constitution describes the body as "a House of Representatives to be called Dáil Éireann" (Teach Ionadóirí ar a dtugtar Dáil Éireann).

The word Dáil is accompanied by the definite article, but Dáil Éireann is not; one speaks of "the Dáil" but not "the Dáil Éireann". The plural of Dáil in the English language is most commonly Dáils, although the Irish-language plural Dálaí is sometimes encountered in English. As there is only ever one Dáil in existence at any one time, the plural is used when referring to the Dáil after different elections; for example, when referring to the 1st and 2nd Dáils.

== Ceann Comhairle ==
The Ceann Comhairle is the chairperson, or presiding member, of the Dáil. The Ceann Comhairle is chosen from among TDs but is required to observe strict impartiality. Despite this, the government will usually try to select one of its own for the position, if its numbers allow. To protect the neutrality of the chair, an incumbent Ceann Comhairle does not seek re-election as a TD but rather is deemed automatically to have been re-elected by their constituency at a general election, unless they are retiring. The Ceann Comhairle does not vote except in the event of a tie. The current Ceann Comhairle is independent TD Verona Murphy.

== Powers ==
While the Dáil is one of three components of the Oireachtas, the other two being the President of Ireland and Seanad Éireann, the powers the constitution grants to the Dáil render it by far the dominant branch, meaning that most bills passed by the Dáil will ultimately become law. The president, upon consultation with the Council of State, may refer a bill to the Supreme Court of Ireland to test its constitutionality. If the Court finds that the bill is inconsistent with the Constitution, the president may not sign the bill.

In addition to its legislative role, it is the Dáil that approves the nomination the Taoiseach for appointment by the President. The Dáil may also pass a motion of no confidence in the Government, in which case the Taoiseach must either seek a parliamentary dissolution or resign. It has happened only once that the loss of confidence of the Dáil did not result in a general election: in 1994 John Bruton of Fine Gael became Taoiseach when the Labour Party left the Fianna Fáil coalition government led by Albert Reynolds.

The Dáil has exclusive power to:

- Nominate the Taoiseach for appointment by the president;
- Approve the Taoiseach's nominees en bloc to serve as Government ministers on their appointment by the president;
- Approve the budget;
- Initiate bills to amend the Constitution;
- Ratify treaties which include financial provisions (Provided they do not conflict with the Constitution of Ireland);
- Approve a declaration of war;
- Initiate 'money bills' or bills which incur a charge on the public finances (on the recommendation of the Government only);
- Nominate the Comptroller and Auditor General

== Activities ==
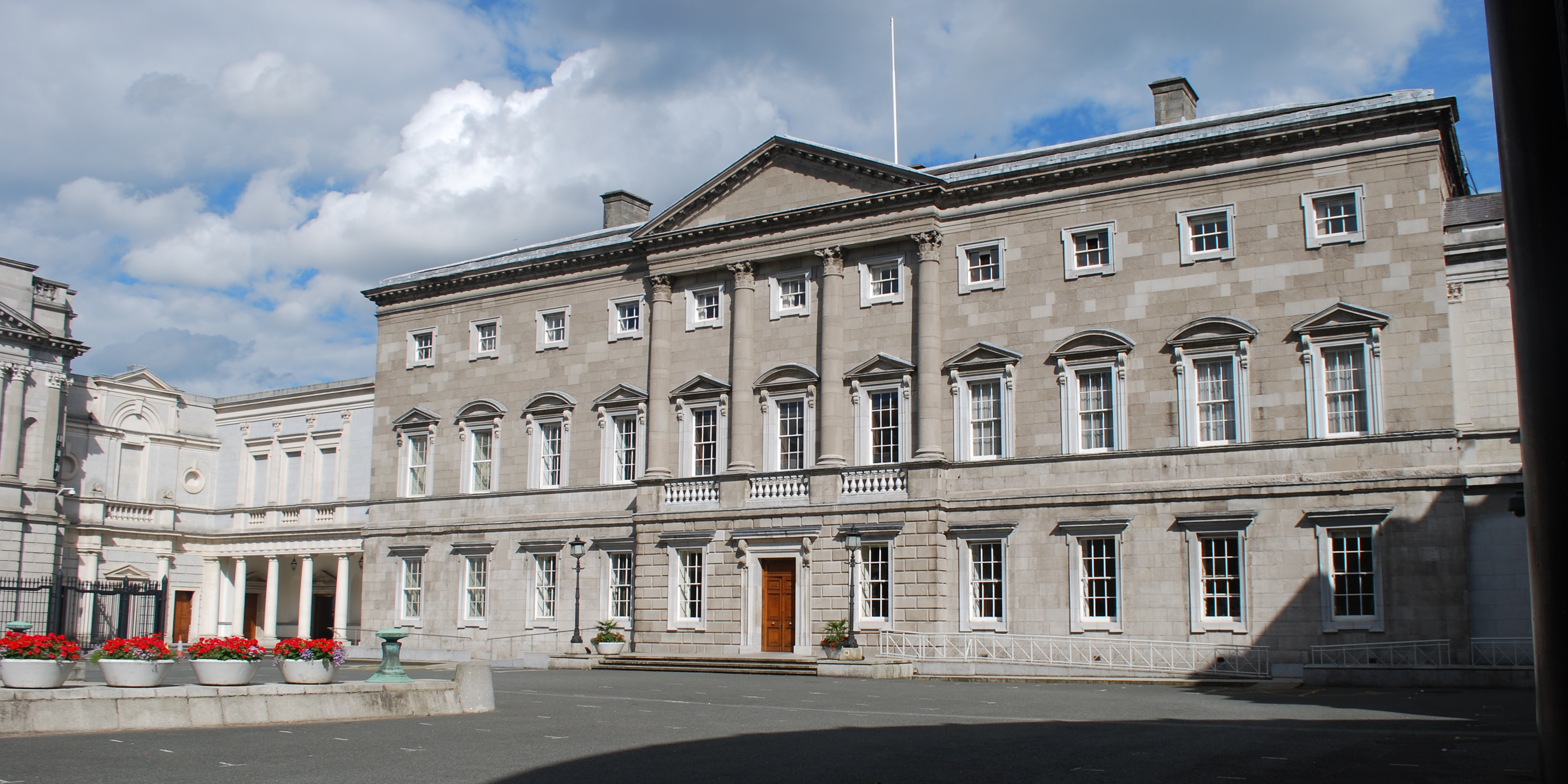
Leinster House in Dublin, seat of Dáil Éireann.

The Dáil determines its own standing orders and its members are protected by certain rights arising from parliamentary privilege. In line with other modern parliamentary systems, TDs do not generally vote in accordance with their consciences or the wishes of their constituents, but must follow the instructions of party whips, a practice that originated in the Irish Parliamentary Party. Except in exceptional circumstances, the Dáil meets in public. The Dáil currently has three standing committees and thirteen select committees.

As of 2019, the Dáil sits on Tuesdays, Wednesdays and Thursdays when the Oireachtas is sitting. On Tuesdays the Dáil normally sits from 2pm until 11pm, on Wednesdays from 9.12am until around 11.30pm and on Thursdays from 9am until around 8pm.

A typical day consists of questions to various cabinet ministers, Leaders’ questions whereby opposition Leaders ask the Taoiseach questions and routine debates on Bills. Every Tuesday and Wednesday three hours over the two days are given to the debate of opposition motions. These normally try to embarrass the government and are widely covered in the media. The government and its majority normally amends these suitably and the amended version is passed by the Government.

Debate and speeches are generally in English, but TDs may switch between Irish and English.

=== Standards of conduct ===
The Ceann Comhairle has ruled that it is disorderly for one deputy to describe another as a brat, buffoon, chancer, communist, corner boy, coward, fascist, gurrier, guttersnipe, hypocrite, rat, scumbag, scurrilous speaker or yahoo; or to insinuate that a TD is lying or drunk; or has violated the secrets of cabinet, or doctored an official report. Also, the reference to "handbagging", particularly with reference to a female member of the House, has been deemed to be unparliamentary. The Dáil maintains a document, Salient Rulings of the Chair which covers behaviour in and out of the House by TDs; section 428 of this lists unparliamentary speech.

== Committees ==
There are 35 Committees as of 30 July 2025. Most Committees have both a "Select Committee" and a corresponding joint committee with the same responsibilities.

=== Standing committees ===
- Business Committee (Also acts as the Dáil Committee of Selection)
- Committee on Budgetary Oversight
- Committee on Consolidation Bills
- Committee on Members' Interests of Dáil Éireann
- Committee on Parliamentary Privileges and Oversight
- Committee on Standing Orders and Dáil Reform
- Committee of Public Accounts
- Working Group of Committee Cathaoirligh
- Committee on Members Interests (Seanad Éireann)
- Committee of Selection (Seanad Éireann)
- Committee on Parliamentary Privileges and Oversight (Seanad Éireann)

=== Joint/Select committees ===
- Committee on Agriculture and Food
- Joint Committee on Artificial Intelligence
- Committee on Arts, Media, Communication, Culture and Sport
- Committee on Children and Equality
- Committee on Climate, Environment and Energ
- Committee on Defence and National Security
- Committee on Disability Matters
- Joint Committee on Drugs Use
- Committee on Education and Youth
- Committee on Tourism, Enterprise and Employment
- Committee on European Union Affairs
- Committee on Finance, Public Expenditure, Public Service Reform and Digitalisation and Taoiseach
- Committee on Fishiries and Maritime Affairs
- Committee on Foreign Affairs and Trade
- Committee on Further and Higher Education, Research, Innovation and Science
- Committee on Health
- Committee on Housing, Local Government and Heritage
- Committee on Infrastructure and National Development Plan Delivery
- Committee on Justice, Home Affairs and Migration
- Joint Committee on Key Issues Affecting the Traveller Community
- Joint Committee on Public Petitions and the Ombudsmen
- Committee on Social Protection, Rural and Community Development
- Joint Committee on the Implementation of the Good Friday Agreement
- Committee on the Irish Language, Gaeltacht and the Irish-speaking Community
- Committee on Transport

== Voting procedure ==
The Ceann Comhairle (or Leas-Cheann Comhairle) first puts the question in Irish, asking the TDs present to say Tá (Yes) or Níl (No) if they agree or disagree with the question before them. The Ceann Comhairle then gives their opinion as to the outcome of the voice vote. Deputies can challenge the Ceann Comhairle and demand a recorded vote by shouting Vótáil! (Vote!) The Ceann Comhairle then shouts Vótáil! again which starts the voting process. Division bells sound around Leinster House and in some of its adjoining buildings calling deputies to the chamber to vote. The bells ring for six minutes and the doors to the chamber are locked after a further four minutes.

The Ceann Comhairle then appoints two tellers for each side and deputies are given one minute to vote. The vote is taken by electronic means whereby Deputies press either the Tá or Níl button on their desks to vote for or against a motion. After the voting time has concluded a sheet (Division Paper) containing the result and each TDs vote is signed by the four tellers and given to the Ceann Comhairle who declares the result.

While electronic voting has become the norm the Dáil votes manually through the lobbies at the back of the chamber on a number of occasions, for example, motions of no confidence. A teller in an electronic vote can call a manual vote if they so wish. This has become an opposition tactic during important votes which are widely covered in the media.

== History ==
=== Precursors ===
The first legislature to exist in Ireland was the Parliament of Ireland from 1297 to 1800, and its house of representatives was the House of Commons. However the Parliament of Ireland was abolished under the Act of Union of 1800, with MPs elected for Ireland sitting in the House of Commons of the United Kingdom until 1922. Irish nationalists first convened Dáil Éireann as a revolutionary parliament in 1919 and while it successfully took over most functions of government it was not recognised under United Kingdom law.

In 1921 the United Kingdom government established a legislature called the Parliament of Southern Ireland in an effort to appease nationalists by granting Ireland limited home rule. However this body was rejected and boycotted by nationalists whose allegiance remained with the Dáil. Nonetheless, because the First Dáil was illegal under the United Kingdom constitution, the lower house of the Parliament of Southern Ireland, the House of Commons of Southern Ireland, is considered in British legal theory as the precursor to the Dáil.

=== Revolutionary Dáil (1919–1922) ===
The current Dáil derives from the 1937 Constitution of Ireland, but a continuity from the First Dáil of 1919 is considered to exist. That Dáil was an assembly established by Sinn Féin MPs elected to the House of Commons of the United Kingdom in the 1918 United Kingdom general election. They had contested the election on a manifesto commitment of "[establishing] a constituent assembly comprising persons chosen by Irish constituencies as the supreme national authority to speak and act in the name of the Irish people". Upon winning 73 of the 105 Irish seats in the election, Sinn Féin MPs refused to recognise the United Kingdom parliament and instead convened as Dáil Éireann (translated as "Assembly of Ireland"): the unicameral legislature of a unilaterally declared Irish Republic, and the first Irish parliament to exist since 1801. The Dáil of the Irish Republic, however, was only recognised internationally by the Russian Soviet Federative Socialist Republic. The first meeting of the Dáil occurred in Dublin on 21 January 1919, in the Mansion House, attended by 27 members. The body was prohibited in the following September, and was forced underground, meeting in several locations thereafter.

=== Irish Free State (1922–1937) ===
The Dáil of the Irish Republic was succeeded on 6 December 1922 by the Dáil of the Irish Free State. The Irish Free State, comprising the twenty-six southern and western counties of Ireland, was established under the 1921 Anglo-Irish Treaty. Dáil Éireann was the house of representatives, described in the new constitution as a "Chamber of Deputies, of a bicameral legislature called the Oireachtas of the Irish Free State." The first Dáil to exist under the Constitution of the Irish Free State succeeded the Second Dáil of the Irish Republic and so was styled the 3rd Dáil. The 3rd Dáil, and every subsequent Dáil, has met in Leinster House.

=== Constitution of Ireland (since 1937) ===
The Constitution of Ireland, adopted in 1937, established the modern Irish state, referred to as Ireland. Under the constitution a new legislature retained the title Oireachtas, and its lower house remained Dáil Éireann. The first Dáil to meet under the Constitution of Ireland was described as the Ninth Dáil.

During the COVID-19 pandemic and the necessity for social distancing, the Dáil temporarily sat at the Convention Centre Dublin from June 2020 to July 2021. From September 2021, the Dáil returned to sitting in Leinster House.

== Historical composition ==
=== Irish Republic (1916/1919–1922) ===
Lab / SF (Anti) / SF / SF (Pro) / Lab U / IPP / Others / Ind / FP / Ind. U / Irish U		Total seats
1918	73 / 3 / 6 / 1 / 22	105
1921	124 / 4	128
1922	17 / 36 / 58 / 1 / 9 / 7	128

=== Irish Free State (1922–1937) ===
Lab / SF / Rep / FF / Others / Ind / CnG / FG / FP / NCP / NLP		Total seats
1923	14 / 44 / 4 / 13 / 63 / 15	153
Jun 1927	22 / 5 / 44 / 16 / 47 / 11 / 8	153
Sep 1927	13 / 57 / 1 / 12 / 62 / 6 / 2	153
1932	7 / 72 / 14 / 57 / 3	153
1933	8 / 77 / 9 / 48 / 11	153
1937	13 / 69 / 8 / 48	138

=== Republic of Ireland (since 1937) ===
WP / SP / PBP / PBP–S / I4C / DL / SF / SD / GP / Lab / NL / CnP / CnT / FF / Others / Ind / PD / FG / II / Aon		Total seats
1938	9 / 77 / 7 / 45	138
1943	17 / 10 / 67 / 1 / 11 / 32	138
1944	8 / 4 / 9 / 76 / 1 / 10 / 30	138
1948	14 / 5 / 10 / 7 / 68 / 1 / 11 / 31	147
1951	16 / 2 / 6 / 69 / 14 / 40	147
1954	19 / 3 / 5 / 65 / 5 / 50	147
1957	4 / 12 / 1 / 3 / 78 / 9 / 40	147
1961	16 / 1 / 2 / 70 / 2 / 6 / 47	144
1965	22 / 1 / 72 / 2 / 47	144
1969	18 / 75 / 1 / 50	144
1973	19 / 69 / 2 / 54	144
1977	17 / 84 / 4 / 43	148
1981	1 / 15 / 78 / 3 / 4 / 65	166
Feb 1982	3 / 15 / 81 / 4 / 63	166
Nov 1982	2 / 16 / 75 / 3 / 70	166
1987	4 / 12 / 81 / 1 / 3 / 14 / 51	166
1989	7 / 1 / 15 / 77 / 1 / 4 / 6 / 55	166
1992	4 / 1 / 33 / 68 / 5 / 10 / 45	166
1997	1 / 4 / 1 / 2 / 17 / 77 / 6 / 4 / 54	166
2002	1 / 5 / 6 / 21 / 81 / 13 / 8 / 31	166
2007	4 / 6 / 20 / 78 / 5 / 2 / 51	166
2011	2 / 2 / 14 / 37 / 20 / 1 / 14 / 76	166
2016	6 / 4 / 23 / 3 / 2 / 7 / 19 / 44 / 50	158
2020	5 / 1 / 37 / 6 / 12 / 6 / 19 / 38 / 35 / 1	160
2024	3 / 39 / 11 / 1 / 11 / 1 / 16 / 48 / 38 / 4 / 2	174

== Gender composition ==
The 2024 general election saw a record number of 246 female candidates standing for election across all 43 Dáil constituencies. This equated to 36% of all candidates. However, just 44 women TDs were elected to the 34th Dáil, representing 25.5% of the 174 elected members. Data from the Inter-Parliamentary Union in 2024 described the Dáil as the "worst [parliamentary chamber] for gender diversity in western Europe". Despite having statutory gender quotas for candidates seeking election to the Dáil since 2012, the number of women elected as TDs has only increased modestly since then.

The 34th Dáil has seen some important gender advancement however. Verona Murphy became the first female Ceann Comhairle of the Dáil in December 2024. In October 2025, Elaine Gunn was appointed as the first female Clerk of Dáil Éireann and Secretary General of the Houses of the Oireachtas service.

== See also ==
- Bicameralism
- Dáil election results
- Elections in the Republic of Ireland
- History of the Republic of Ireland
- Politics of the Republic of Ireland
- Records of members of the Oireachtas
