= Verona Murphy =

Irish politician (born 1971)

Verona Murphy TD
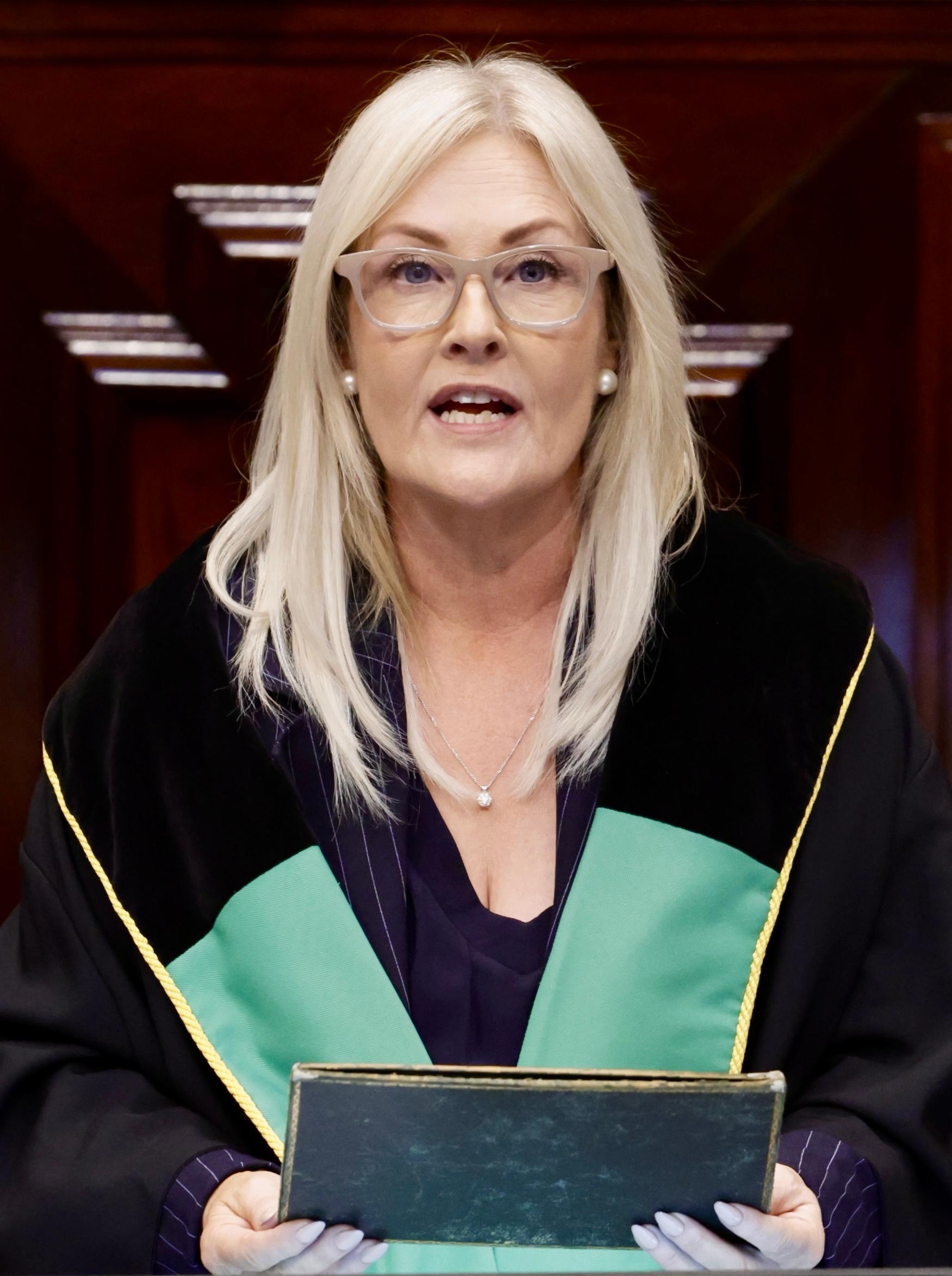
- Murphy in 2025

Ceann Comhairle of Dáil Éireann
- Incumbent
- Assumed office 18 December 2024
- Deputy: John McGuinness
- Preceded by: Seán Ó Fearghaíl

Teachta Dála
- Incumbent
- Assumed office February 2020
- Constituency: Wexford

Personal details
- Born: 1970/1971 (age 54–55) Ramsgrange, County Wexford, Ireland
- Party: Independent
- Other political affiliations: Fine Gael (until 2020)
- Domestic partner: Joe Druhan
- Children: 1
- Education: Institute of Technology, Carlow

Verona Murphy (born 1970/1971) is an Irish independent politician who has been Ceann Comhairle of Dáil Éireann since 2024, and a Teachta Dála (TD) for the Wexford constituency since 2020. Originally from the Ramsgrange area of County Wexford, Murphy was involved in the road haulage business before unsuccessfully standing for election for Fine Gael in the 2019 Wexford by-election. After being de-selected by Fine Gael, she stood and was elected as an independent TD at the 2020 and 2024 general elections.

== Early life ==
One of 11 children, Murphy was born and raised in Ramsgrange by parents who were farmers and livestock dealers. She dropped out of school at 15, before moving to England, where she worked at a Vauxhall Motors factory by day and a McDonald's franchise by night. She then returned to Ireland and bought her first truck and trailer at the age of 21. She later returned to education, doing her Leaving Certificate at 35 and graduating with a BA in law from Institute of Technology, Carlow.

Murphy ran a haulage firm, Drumur Transport, with her partner Joseph Druhan. The business closed in 2021. She was elected as the president of the Irish Road Haulage Association in 2015, the second woman to hold the position. In 2018, the Workplace Relations Committee ruled against Murphy in finding that she had penalised an office worker in her 60s who had raised allegations of bullying against her, in her role as president of the Irish Road Haulage Association. The WRC ordered the IRHA to pay €20,000 compensation to the complainant. Following her election to the Dáil, Murphy stepped down as president of the association.

Murphy has one child, a daughter she had at the age of 22.

== Political career ==
=== 2019 Wexford by-election ===
She was selected as the Fine Gael candidate for the November 2019 Wexford by-election, which was called after the election of Mick Wallace to the European Parliament. During the by-election campaign, Murphy made remarks supporting Noel Grealish's attempts to block a direct provision centre being created in Oughterard, County Galway, and suggested that immigrants coming to Ireland were being "infiltrated by ISIS" and would need to be "deprogrammed". She described immigrants as young as "three or four years old" as a danger because of ISIS brainwashing and that ISIS is a "big part" of the migrant population in Ireland.

These remarks were criticised by the Irish Refugee Council and by members of opposition parties in the Dáil. Murphy subsequently apologised for her remarks and issued a statement, stating "This was a very poor choice of words and I am very sorry to anyone who was offended by them. People coming here fleeing persecution deserve to be treated with compassion and respect. They need to be given opportunities to forge a new start for themselves and their families. That is why we have direct provision: to provide board and lodging to people seeking asylum".

However, following the apology, Murphy released a campaign video on YouTube in which she stated that she had been "the victim of “character assassination in the media". This prompted the leader of Fine Gael and Taoiseach Leo Varadkar to comment directly on Murphy, stating the video was "bizarre" and "not party-approved". Several other top-ranking members of Fine Gael were also disturbed by her campaign, including Tánaiste Simon Coveney, who stated that Murphy's comments were wrong, and her choice of language about migrants was not acceptable. Murphy refused to participate in any of the by-election debates or panel discussions during the campaign. Fine Gael stated it was aware of allegations against Murphy of workplace bullying before the campaign began.

On election day, Murphy received 9,543 (23.8%) first preference votes and was eliminated on the fourth count, in third place behind Malcolm Byrne (Fianna Fail) and George Lawlor (Labour). Despite the defeat, Murphy insisted on election day that she would be Fine Gael's candidate in the 2020 general election.

=== Removal from Fine Gael ticket ===
In December 2019, Fine Gael de-selected Murphy as a candidate for the 2020 general election, as a result of her behaviour during the November by-election. When asked again about Murphy after the by-election, Leo Varadkar stated "quite frankly I'm glad she didn't get elected" and remarked; "What was done subsequently in terms of the video she did which sort of tried to imply the whole thing was a media character assassination attempt on her – I had a big problem with that because maybe it suggested to me that the apology and retraction wasn't fully sincere." Furthermore, Varadkar declared that it had been a "mistake" by Fine Gael to select Murphy as a candidate, a mistake for which he took responsibility.

Following her de-selection, Murphy left Fine Gael.

=== Independent TD ===
In the 2020 general election, Murphy was elected as an independent TD in the Wexford constituency.

In November 2021 Murphy was accused of spreading anti-vax information in the Dáil by health minister Stephen Donnelly after Murphy stated studies had shown "that a vaccinated person is every bit as likely to transmit this virus as a non-vaccinated person". Murphy stated she was not "anti-vax" and had been vaccinated herself, but believed the choice to take vaccinations was up to the individual.

In February 2024, Murphy confirmed that she would run a team of candidates as part of the newly formed Wexford Independent Alliance at the 2024 Wexford County Council election. The alliance ran 12 candidates and five were elected to Wexford County Council.

Murphy was re-elected at the 2024 general election, topping the poll with 21.6% of first-preference votes and being elected on the first count.

=== Ceann Comhairle ===
On 18 December 2024, Murphy was elected to the position of Ceann Comhairle of the 34th Dáil. She is the first woman to hold the office. As a result of protests against her decision to grant opposition questioning time to Independent TDs who support the government, several opposition TDs launched a protest in one of the first sessions of the 34th Dáil. The protest saw Murphy "[lose] control of the House for more than five and a half hours" on her first day as Ceann Comhairle, leading to some calls for her resignation. This situation evolved into the 2025 Dáil speaking rights dispute. On 26 March 2025, the leaders of Sinn Féin and the Labour Party each expressed no confidence in Murphy's position, offering her "time to reflect" before considering a formal motion. On 1 April 2025, Murphy won a motion of no confidence. It was the first time since the establishment of the Dáil in 1919 that a Ceann Comhairle stood against a motion of no confidence.

As Ceann Comhairle, Murphy also serves as Cathaoirleach of the influential Business Committee, the Committee on Parliamentary Privileges and Oversight and the Committee on Standing Orders and Dáil Reform. In an article published by The Journal in early 2026, reflecting on opposition attitudes towards Murphy since the 2025 confidence vote, the whips for the Social Democrats, Sinn Féin and Labour were respectively quoted as describing Murphy's chairing of Dáil debates as "fair", that they had a "'decent working relationship' with the Ceann Comhairle", and that there was a "good professional relationship" between Murphy and opposition parties.

Political offices
| Preceded by Seán Ó Fearghaíl | Ceann Comhairle of Dáil Éireann; 2024–present | Incumbent |

| Dáil | Election | Deputy (Party) | Deputy (Party) | Deputy (Party) | Deputy (Party) | Deputy (Party) |
|---|---|---|---|---|---|---|
| 2nd | 1921 | Richard Corish (SF) | James Ryan (SF) | Séamus Doyle (SF) | Seán Etchingham (SF) | 4 seats 1921–1923 |
| 3rd | 1922 | Richard Corish (Lab) | Daniel O'Callaghan (Lab) | Séamus Doyle (AT-SF) | Michael Doyle (FP) | 4 seats 1921–1923 |
| 4th | 1923 | Richard Corish (Lab) | James Ryan (Rep) | Robert Lambert (Rep) | Michael Doyle (FP) | Osmond Esmonde (CnaG) |
| 5th | 1927 (Jun) | Richard Corish (Lab) | James Ryan (FF) | James Shannon (Lab) | Michael Doyle (FP) | John Keating (NL) |
| 6th | 1927 (Sep) | Richard Corish (Lab) | James Ryan (FF) | Denis Allen (FF) | Michael Jordan (FP) | Osmond Esmonde (CnaG) |
| 7th | 1932 | Richard Corish (Lab) | James Ryan (FF) | Denis Allen (FF) | John Keating (CnaG) | Osmond Esmonde (CnaG) |
| 8th | 1933 | Richard Corish (Lab) | James Ryan (FF) | Patrick Kehoe (FF) | John Keating (CnaG) | Osmond Esmonde (CnaG) |
| 8th | 1936 by-election | Richard Corish (Lab) | James Ryan (FF) | Patrick Kehoe (FF) | John Keating (CnaG) | Denis Allen (FF) |
| 9th | 1937 | Richard Corish (Lab) | James Ryan (FF) | John Keating (FG) | John Esmonde (FG) | Denis Allen (FF) |
| 10th | 1938 | Richard Corish (Lab) | James Ryan (FF) | John Keating (FG) | John Esmonde (FG) | Denis Allen (FF) |
| 11th | 1943 | Richard Corish (Lab) | James Ryan (FF) | John O'Leary (Lab) | John Esmonde (FG) | Denis Allen (FF) |
| 12th | 1944 | Richard Corish (Lab) | James Ryan (FF) | John O'Leary (NLP) | John Keating (FG) | Denis Allen (FF) |
| 12th | 1945 by-election | Brendan Corish (Lab) | James Ryan (FF) | John O'Leary (NLP) | John Keating (FG) | Denis Allen (FF) |
| 13th | 1948 | Brendan Corish (Lab) | James Ryan (FF) | John O'Leary (NLP) | John Esmonde (FG) | Denis Allen (FF) |
| 14th | 1951 | Brendan Corish (Lab) | James Ryan (FF) | John O'Leary (Lab) | Anthony Esmonde (FG) | Denis Allen (FF) |
| 15th | 1954 | Brendan Corish (Lab) | James Ryan (FF) | John O'Leary (Lab) | Anthony Esmonde (FG) | Denis Allen (FF) |
| 16th | 1957 | Brendan Corish (Lab) | James Ryan (FF) | Seán Browne (FF) | Anthony Esmonde (FG) | Denis Allen (FF) |
| 17th | 1961 | Brendan Corish (Lab) | James Ryan (FF) | Lorcan Allen (FF) | Anthony Esmonde (FG) | 4 seats 1961–1981 |
| 18th | 1965 | Brendan Corish (Lab) | James Kennedy (FF) | Lorcan Allen (FF) | Anthony Esmonde (FG) | 4 seats 1961–1981 |
| 19th | 1969 | Brendan Corish (Lab) | Seán Browne (FF) | Lorcan Allen (FF) | Anthony Esmonde (FG) | 4 seats 1961–1981 |
| 20th | 1973 | Brendan Corish (Lab) | Seán Browne (FF) | Lorcan Allen (FF) | John Esmonde (FG) | 4 seats 1961–1981 |
| 21st | 1977 | Brendan Corish (Lab) | Seán Browne (FF) | Lorcan Allen (FF) | Michael D'Arcy (FG) | 4 seats 1961–1981 |
| 22nd | 1981 | Brendan Corish (Lab) | Ivan Yates (FG) | Lorcan Allen (FF) | Michael D'Arcy (FG) | Hugh Byrne (FF) |
| 23rd | 1982 (Feb) | Seán Browne (FF) | Ivan Yates (FG) | Lorcan Allen (FF) | Michael D'Arcy (FG) | Hugh Byrne (FF) |
| 24th | 1982 (Nov) | Avril Doyle (FG) | Ivan Yates (FG) | John Browne (FF) | Michael D'Arcy (FG) | Hugh Byrne (FF) |
| 25th | 1987 | Avril Doyle (FG) | Ivan Yates (FG) | John Browne (FF) | Brendan Howlin (Lab) | Hugh Byrne (FF) |
| 26th | 1989 | Michael D'Arcy (FG) | Ivan Yates (FG) | John Browne (FF) | Brendan Howlin (Lab) | Séamus Cullimore (FF) |
| 27th | 1992 | Avril Doyle (FG) | Ivan Yates (FG) | John Browne (FF) | Brendan Howlin (Lab) | Hugh Byrne (FF) |
| 28th | 1997 | Michael D'Arcy (FG) | Ivan Yates (FG) | John Browne (FF) | Brendan Howlin (Lab) | Hugh Byrne (FF) |
| 29th | 2002 | Paul Kehoe (FG) | Liam Twomey (Ind.) | John Browne (FF) | Brendan Howlin (Lab) | Tony Dempsey (FF) |
| 30th | 2007 | Paul Kehoe (FG) | Michael W. D'Arcy (FG) | John Browne (FF) | Brendan Howlin (Lab) | Seán Connick (FF) |
| 31st | 2011 | Paul Kehoe (FG) | Liam Twomey (FG) | John Browne (FF) | Brendan Howlin (Lab) | Mick Wallace (Ind.) |
| 32nd | 2016 | Paul Kehoe (FG) | Michael W. D'Arcy (FG) | James Browne (FF) | Brendan Howlin (Lab) | Mick Wallace (I4C) |
| 32nd | 2019 by-election | Paul Kehoe (FG) | Michael W. D'Arcy (FG) | James Browne (FF) | Brendan Howlin (Lab) | Malcolm Byrne (FF) |
| 33rd | 2020 | Paul Kehoe (FG) | Verona Murphy (Ind.) | James Browne (FF) | Brendan Howlin (Lab) | Johnny Mythen (SF) |
| 34th | 2024 | 4 seats since 2024 | Verona Murphy (Ind.) | James Browne (FF) | George Lawlor (Lab) | Johnny Mythen (SF) |
