= John McGuinness (politician) =

Irish politician (born 1955)

John McGuinness TD
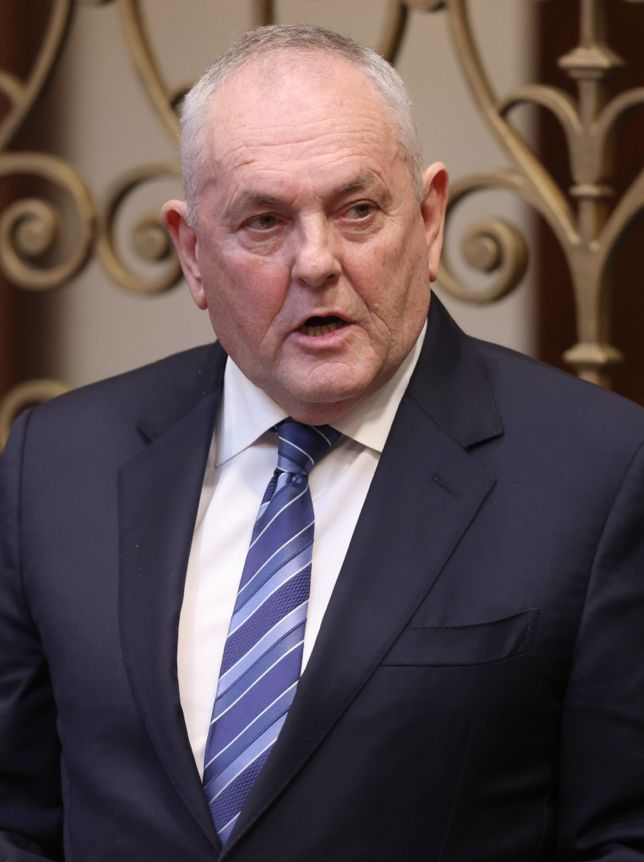
- McGuinness in 2024

Leas-Cheann Comhairle of Dáil Éireann
- Incumbent
- Assumed office 19 February 2025
- Ceann Comhairle: Verona Murphy
- Preceded by: Catherine Connolly

Chair of the Committee on Finance, Public Expenditure and Reform, and Taoiseach
- In office 4 April 2016 – 8 November 2024
- Preceded by: Ciarán Lynch

Chair of the Public Accounts Committee
- In office 10 March 2011 – 4 April 2016
- Preceded by: Bernard Allen
- Succeeded by: Seán Fleming

Minister of State
- 2007–2009: Enterprise, Trade and Employment

Teachta Dála
- Incumbent
- Assumed office June 1997
- Constituency: Carlow–Kilkenny

Personal details
- Born: 15 March 1955 (age 71) Kilkenny, Ireland
- Party: Fianna Fáil
- Spouse: Margaret Redmond (m. 1979)
- Children: 4
- Relatives: Yvonne McGuinness (niece)
- Education: University College Cork
- Website: johnmcguinness.ie

John James McGuinness (born 15 March 1955) is an Irish Fianna Fáil politician who has served as Leas-Cheann Comhairle of the 34th Dáil since February 2025. He has been a Teachta Dála (TD) for the Carlow–Kilkenny constituency since the 1997 general election. He was appointed Chair of the Committee on Finance, Public Expenditure and Reform, and Taoiseach in April 2016. He served as Chair of the Public Accounts Committee from 2011 to 2016 and as a Minister of State from 2007 to 2009.

== Personal life ==
McGuinness was born in Kilkenny and educated in CBC Kilkenny. He holds a Diploma in Business Management. In 1979 he married Margaret Redmond and they have three sons and one daughter. His eldest son Andrew is a Fianna Fáil County Councillor on Kilkenny County Council and served as Mayor three times.

== Political career ==
He first entered local politics in 1979 when he won a seat on Kilkenny Borough Council and was a subsequent mayor of the city from 1996 to 1997. He was the third generation of his family to serve on this council. From 1991 until the abolition of the dual mandate in 2003, he was also member of Kilkenny County Council, where his father, Michael McGuinness, was the longest-serving councillor (1959–1999).

He was first elected to Dáil Éireann as a Fianna Fáil TD for the Carlow–Kilkenny constituency at the 1997 general election. He was chairperson of the Public Accounts Committee in the 29th Dáil and a member of the Joint Oireachtas Committees for European Affairs, Enterprise and Small Business, Justice, and Women's Rights in the 28th Dáil.

In July 2007, he was appointed by the government on the nomination of Taoiseach Bertie Ahern as Minister of State at the Department of Enterprise, Trade and Employment with responsibility for Trade and Commerce. He was re-appointed by the government on the nomination of Taoiseach Brian Cowen to the same position on 13 May 2008. On 22 April 2009, as part of cost-cutting measures due to the Irish financial crisis, Cowen reduced the number of Ministers of State from 20 to 15. McGuinness was among the seven junior ministers who were not reappointed.

McGuinness then revealed a testy relationship with his senior minister Mary Coughlan, and considerable disagreement with policy in the department. On 24 April 2009, he criticised Coughlan and Cowen for their lack of leadership being given to the country. He said: "She's not equipped to deal with the complex issues of dealing with enterprise and business within the department. And neither is the department". McGuinness later rejected suggestions he campaigned to undermine Coughlan, when it was revealed that he had hired external PR advice in an effort to enhance his own profile as a Minister of State within the department.

In 2010, a political memoir that he co-wrote with Naoise Nunn, called The House Always Wins, was published by Gill & Macmillan.

In the 31st Dáil, McGuinness served as Chair of the Public Accounts Committee. He was the Fianna Fáil Spokesperson on Small Business and Regulatory Framework from April 2011 to March 2016.

He declared that he would vote No in the 2015 referendum to allow same-sex marriage.

In the 32nd Dáil, McGuinness served as Chair of the Finance, Public Expenditure and Reform, and Taoiseach Committee.

At the 2024 general election, McGuinness was re-elected to the Dáil.

He chairs the Ireland-Taiwan Parliamentary Friendship Association.

| Dáil | Election | Deputy (Party) | Deputy (Party) | Deputy (Party) | Deputy (Party) | Deputy (Party) |
|---|---|---|---|---|---|---|
| 2nd | 1921 | Edward Aylward (SF) | W. T. Cosgrave (SF) | James Lennon (SF) | Gearóid O'Sullivan (SF) | 4 seats 1921–1923 |
| 3rd | 1922 | Patrick Gaffney (Lab) | W. T. Cosgrave (PT-SF) | Denis Gorey (FP) | Gearóid O'Sullivan (PT-SF) | 4 seats 1921–1923 |
| 4th | 1923 | Edward Doyle (Lab) | W. T. Cosgrave (CnaG) | Denis Gorey (FP) | Michael Shelly (Rep) | Seán Gibbons (CnaG) |
| 4th | 1925 by-election | Edward Doyle (Lab) | W. T. Cosgrave (CnaG) | Denis Gorey (FP) | Michael Shelly (Rep) | Thomas Bolger (CnaG) |
| 5th | 1927 (Jun) | Edward Doyle (Lab) | W. T. Cosgrave (CnaG) | Denis Gorey (CnaG) | Thomas Derrig (FF) | Richard Holohan (FP) |
| 6th | 1927 (Sep) | Edward Doyle (Lab) | W. T. Cosgrave (CnaG) | Peter de Loughry (CnaG) | Thomas Derrig (FF) | Richard Holohan (FP) |
| 6th | 1927 by-election | Edward Doyle (Lab) | Denis Gorey (CnaG) | Peter de Loughry (CnaG) | Thomas Derrig (FF) | Richard Holohan (FP) |
| 7th | 1932 | Francis Humphreys (FF) | Denis Gorey (CnaG) | Desmond FitzGerald (CnaG) | Thomas Derrig (FF) | Seán Gibbons (FF) |
| 8th | 1933 | James Pattison (Lab) | Richard Holohan (NCP) | Desmond FitzGerald (CnaG) | Thomas Derrig (FF) | Seán Gibbons (FF) |
| 9th | 1937 | Constituency abolished. See Kilkenny and Carlow–Kildare | | | | |

| Dáil | Election | Deputy (Party) | Deputy (Party) | Deputy (Party) | Deputy (Party) | Deputy (Party) |
|---|---|---|---|---|---|---|
| 13th | 1948 | James Pattison (NLP) | Thomas Walsh (FF) | Thomas Derrig (FF) | Joseph Hughes (FG) | Patrick Crotty (FG) |
| 14th | 1951 | Francis Humphreys (FF) | Thomas Walsh (FF) | Thomas Derrig (FF) | Joseph Hughes (FG) | Patrick Crotty (FG) |
| 15th | 1954 | James Pattison (Lab) | Thomas Walsh (FF) | Thomas Derrig (FF) | Joseph Hughes (FG) | Patrick Crotty (FG) |
| 15th | 1956 by-election | James Pattison (Lab) | Martin Medlar (FF) | Thomas Derrig (FF) | Joseph Hughes (FG) | Patrick Crotty (FG) |
| 16th | 1957 | Francis Humphreys (FF) | Martin Medlar (FF) | Jim Gibbons (FF) | Joseph Hughes (FG) | Patrick Crotty (FG) |
| 16th | 1960 by-election | Patrick Teehan (FF) | Martin Medlar (FF) | Jim Gibbons (FF) | Joseph Hughes (FG) | Patrick Crotty (FG) |
| 17th | 1961 | Séamus Pattison (Lab) | Martin Medlar (FF) | Jim Gibbons (FF) | Desmond Governey (FG) | Patrick Crotty (FG) |
| 18th | 1965 | Séamus Pattison (Lab) | Tom Nolan (FF) | Jim Gibbons (FF) | Desmond Governey (FG) | Patrick Crotty (FG) |
| 19th | 1969 | Séamus Pattison (Lab) | Tom Nolan (FF) | Jim Gibbons (FF) | Desmond Governey (FG) | Kieran Crotty (FG) |
| 20th | 1973 | Séamus Pattison (Lab) | Tom Nolan (FF) | Jim Gibbons (FF) | Desmond Governey (FG) | Kieran Crotty (FG) |
| 21st | 1977 | Séamus Pattison (Lab) | Tom Nolan (FF) | Jim Gibbons (FF) | Liam Aylward (FF) | Kieran Crotty (FG) |
| 22nd | 1981 | Séamus Pattison (Lab) | Tom Nolan (FF) | Desmond Governey (FG) | Liam Aylward (FF) | Kieran Crotty (FG) |
| 23rd | 1982 (Feb) | Séamus Pattison (Lab) | Jim Gibbons (FF) | Desmond Governey (FG) | Liam Aylward (FF) | Kieran Crotty (FG) |
| 24th | 1982 (Nov) | Séamus Pattison (Lab) | M. J. Nolan (FF) | Dick Dowling (FG) | Liam Aylward (FF) | Kieran Crotty (FG) |
| 25th | 1987 | Séamus Pattison (Lab) | M. J. Nolan (FF) | Martin Gibbons (PDs) | Liam Aylward (FF) | Kieran Crotty (FG) |
| 26th | 1989 | Séamus Pattison (Lab) | M. J. Nolan (FF) | Phil Hogan (FG) | Liam Aylward (FF) | John Browne (FG) |
| 27th | 1992 | Séamus Pattison (Lab) | M. J. Nolan (FF) | Phil Hogan (FG) | Liam Aylward (FF) | John Browne (FG) |
| 28th | 1997 | Séamus Pattison (Lab) | John McGuinness (FF) | Phil Hogan (FG) | Liam Aylward (FF) | John Browne (FG) |
| 29th | 2002 | Séamus Pattison (Lab) | John McGuinness (FF) | Phil Hogan (FG) | Liam Aylward (FF) | M. J. Nolan (FF) |
| 30th | 2007 | Mary White (GP) | John McGuinness (FF) | Phil Hogan (FG) | Bobby Aylward (FF) | M. J. Nolan (FF) |
| 31st | 2011 | Ann Phelan (Lab) | John McGuinness (FF) | Phil Hogan (FG) | John Paul Phelan (FG) | Pat Deering (FG) |
| 31st | 2015 by-election | Ann Phelan (Lab) | John McGuinness (FF) | Bobby Aylward (FF) | John Paul Phelan (FG) | Pat Deering (FG) |
| 32nd | 2016 | Kathleen Funchion (SF) | John McGuinness (FF) | Bobby Aylward (FF) | John Paul Phelan (FG) | Pat Deering (FG) |
| 33rd | 2020 | Kathleen Funchion (SF) | John McGuinness (FF) | Jennifer Murnane O'Connor (FF) | John Paul Phelan (FG) | Malcolm Noonan (GP) |
| 34th | 2024 | Natasha Newsome Drennan (SF) | John McGuinness (FF) | Jennifer Murnane O'Connor (FF) | Catherine Callaghan (FG) | Peter "Chap" Cleere (FF) |
