= Impact of the COVID-19 pandemic on politics in the Republic of Ireland =

Consequences of the COVID-19 pandemic on politics in the Republic of Ireland

The COVID-19 pandemic has impacted and affected the political system of the Republic of Ireland, causing suspensions of legislative activities and isolation of multiple politicians due to fears of spreading the virus. Several politicians have tested positive for COVID-19 in 2020, 2021 and 2022.

== General election and government formation ==
On 8 February, a general election took place in Ireland, before the outbreak had been declared a pandemic or reached Europe. Fianna Fáil and Fine Gael began talks on government formation on 11 March prompted by the public health emergency posed by COVID-19.

On 20 February, Taoiseach Leo Varadkar offered his resignation to President Michael D. Higgins at Áras an Uachtaráin, remaining, however, as Taoiseach in a caretaker capacity until the formation of a new government. President of Sinn Féin Mary Lou McDonald was the first high-profile politician affected by the spread of COVID-19, with her party cancelling events and her family entering self-isolation for a period, after McDonald confirmed on 2 March that her children attended the same school as the student with the first recorded case of COVID-19 in Ireland.

== Restriction announcements ==
In response to the COVID-19 pandemic in the Republic of Ireland, the Irish government introduced various public health and economic measures to mitigate its impact.

The virus reached the country in late February 2020 and cases soon confirmed in all counties. The government shut schools, childcare facilities and cultural institutions on 12 March 2020. Taoiseach Leo Varadkar announced the first stay-at-home order on 27 March, which banned all non-essential travel and contact with others.

Infections and deaths dropped to low levels by summer 2020 and restrictions were gradually lifted. Across the country, social distancing measures, self-isolation laws for those exposed to the virus and rules on face masks were introduced, as well as efforts to expand COVID-19 testing and tracing. In autumn and winter 2020, nationwide lockdowns were introduced in response to a surge in COVID-19 cases and the Alpha variant. A COVID-19 vaccination programme began in December 2020. In mid-2021, the government lifted restrictions during the fourth wave driven by the Delta variant, until further restrictions were reintroduced in response to the Omicron variant in December that year. Remaining restrictions were lifted from 28 February 2022 under a Living with COVID-19 plan announced by the government in early 2022.

== Government events ==
On 9 March, a Cabinet Sub-Committee on COVID-19 was established. It published a National Action Plan on 16 March.

On 19 March, Dáil Éireann reconvened under social distancing measures to pass emergency legislation. At the written request of Ceann Comhairle Seán Ó Fearghaíl, the sitting was limited to 48 TDs (11 each representing Fianna Fáil, Fine Gael and Sinn Féin, four Greens, three members of the Regional Group and two members of all other parties and groups). The legislation—Health (Preservation and Protection and other Emergency Measures in the Public Interest) Bill 2020—passed all stages, and, following requests by opposition TDs, included a sunset provision for review in November. During the sitting, Eamon Ryan called on the Irish to grow lettuce on their window sills: "Let's get every south facing window sill in this country and lets plant our seeds in the next week so that if there is any supply crisis in food in two or three months time when this really hits hard, we'll have our salads ready to go".

On 20 March, Seanad Éireann—also sitting in reduced numbers—passed the legislation after a three-hour debate. President Higgins wrote the legislation into law later that day, giving the state the power to detain people, restrict travel and keep people in their homes to restrict the pandemic.

At its next sitting—on 26 March—the Dáil passed further emergency legislation—Emergency Measures in the Public Interest (COVID-19) Bill 2020—introduced due to the virus, again with deliberately limited numbers attending, and without a vote. President of Sinn Féin Mary Lou McDonald was absent after announcing on Twitter that she had awoken with a "head cold" and that Pearse Doherty would lead the party instead. The election for Leas-Cheann Comhairle (deputy "chair" or "speaker" of Dáil Éireann) was scheduled for early that morning, but was deferred. Taoiseach Varadkar asked Denis Naughten to temporarily fill the role to avert a possible constitutional crisis, with the previous occupant Pat "the Cope" Gallagher having lost his seat in the February general election and the need for a Leas-Cheann Comhairle being regarded as critical should Ceann Comhairle Seán Ó Fearghaíl become incapacitated. Naughten, a former Fine Gael politician who left the party to sit as an independent, had run against Ó Fearghaíl during the earlier election to fill the main office. After passing through the Dáil, the bill passed without a vote the following day (27 March) through all stages in the Seanad (in its final sitting before counting got underway in the Seanad election which had to follow the 2020 general election), and President Higgins signed the bill into law the same day. There followed a paralysis of the national legislature on the basis that the Taoiseach had to nominate the final eleven members of the Seanad, Varadkar (as outgoing Taoiseach) did not have the support of the Dáil (and was therefore prevented by the Constitution from filling the vacancies) and no other nomination for Taoiseach could be agreed upon by all parties in the Dáil.

The Dáil met again—one week after its previous sitting—on 2 April again with deliberately limited numbers, this time augmented by a Labour Party boycott—while Mary Lou McDonald's absence continued (announced the previous day) due to her being "under the weather".

The Dáil's next meeting occurred from 12 midday to 7:30 pm on 23 April (following the Easter break), at which a limited number of its members discussed the impact of the virus.

With a new government formed on 27 June, the Dáil moved from its traditional home at Leinster House to the Convention Centre to facilitate social distancing. Thus it was that, Fianna Fáil leader Micheál Martin rotated into position as Taoiseach on a contract of two and a bit years. Ceann Comhairle Seán Ó Fearghaíl confirmed as early as March that arrangements were being made for the move from Leinster House for the occasion, with Dublin Castle also having been suggested as a possible venue. The Convention Centre was announced in early April as having been selected. The Dáil sat in the Convention Centre from June until it was announced on 11 September that it would return to Leinster House for socially-distanced debates on Tuesdays and Thursdays while continuing at the Convention Centre on Wednesdays with full attendance where required for voting purposes.

Many politicians have had to adapt their political campaigning to the restrictions imposed by Level 5 restrictions. Ministers such as Roderic O'Gorman, conducted meetings of the public online, facilitated by Zoom software, instead of face-to-face.

On 5 August, a video emerged online appearing to show multiple breaches of COVID-19 regulations at the pub owned by Independent TD Danny Healy-Rae in Kilgarvan, County Kerry, with young people gathering in the pub wearing no masks, with no social distancing and with access to the bar. The next day, on 6 August, Gardaí began preliminary inquiries into the indoor gathering at the pub. On 8 January 2022, there was to be no prosecution following an investigation into possible breaches of COVID-19 health regulations in the pub.

On the night of 4 September, Tánaiste Leo Varadkar faced criticism after a photograph emerged on social media showing him at the Mighty Hoopla music festival in London on the same weekend Electric Picnic was cancelled in Ireland due to the Government's COVID-19 restrictions.

== Political controversies ==
=== Oireachtas Golf Society scandal ===
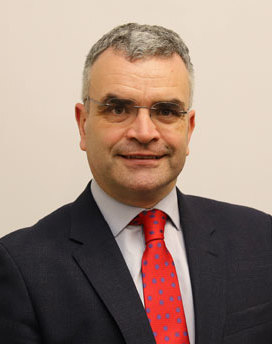
Dara Calleary

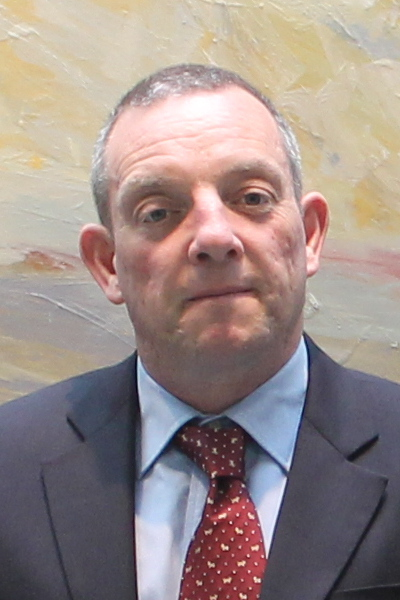
Jerry Buttimer

Calleary, a minister, and Buttimer, a senator, attended the Oireachtas Golf Society event in August 2020; both subsequently resigned from their main political offices.

August 2020 brought the Oireachtas Golf Society scandal. On 21 August, Minister for Agriculture, Food and the Marine Dara Calleary and Seanad Leas-Chathaoirleach Jerry Buttimer resigned after they attended the event, in contravention of regulations under the Health Act. Phil Hogan, the European Commissioner for Trade, soon followed, having also travelled through Kildare while the county was in lockdown and when he was supposed to be self-isolating after arriving in Ireland from Brussels. Meanwhile, amid the golf reports, the new Minister for Health Stephen Donnelly equated COVID-19 to jumping on a trampoline, only to formally retract it afterwards while speaking before an Oireachtas committee.

=== Katherine Zappone controversy ===
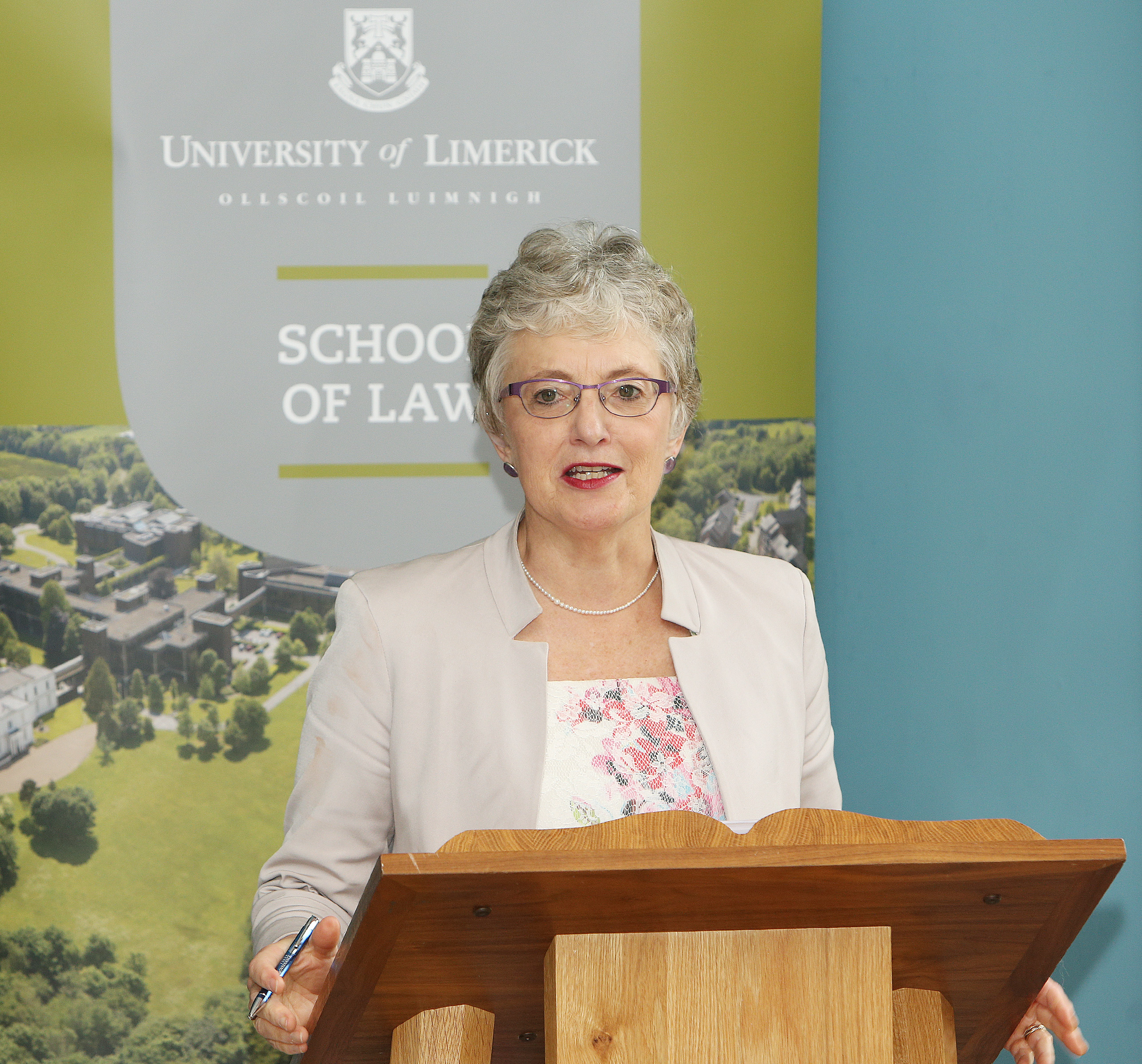
Katherine Zappone

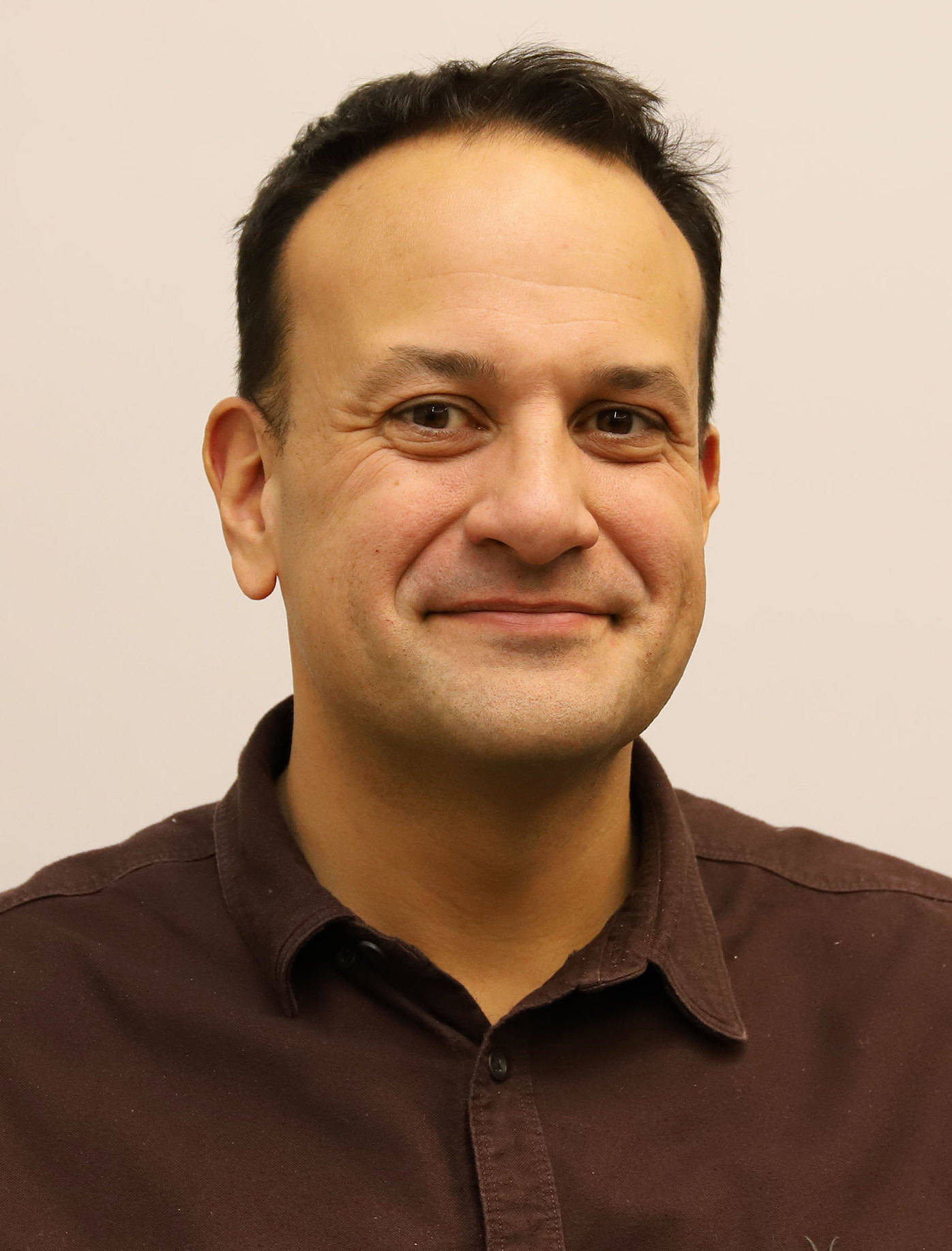
Leo Varadkar

Former Minister for Children Zappone organised the event and Tánaiste Varadkar attended.

August 2021 brought the Merrion Hotel controversy. On 4 August, political pressure was mounting on former Minister for Children Katherine Zappone, who was controversially appointed UN special envoy on freedom of expression, after she organised an outdoor 50-person event at the Merrion Hotel on 21 July and stated that she was "assured" by the hotel that the event was "in compliance with Government COVID-19 restrictions and guidelines". Zappone ultimately declined her UN role after the appointment process was strongly criticised. The controversy took another twist as the Government Press Office released a statement saying that advice from the Attorney General Paul Gallagher was that organised events and gatherings could take place for up to 200 people "including social, recreational, exercise, cultural, entertainment or community events". Comparisons were made between the gathering and the Golfgate scandal from earlier in the pandemic.

=== Department of Foreign Affairs controversy ===
December 2021 brought the Department of Foreign Affairs controversy. On 29 December, an image emerged in the Irish Daily Star, Daily Mail and Irish Mirror newspapers showing at least 20 senior officials and staff from the Department of Foreign Affairs gathering without face coverings or regard for social distancing and drinking bottles of Moët & Chandon at Iveagh House, the headquarters of the department, in breach of public health guidelines on 17 June 2020, when Ireland was elected to the UN Security Council. At the time of the incident, Ireland was at phase two of a roadmap issued by the government for reopening the national economy after the first peak of the COVID-19 pandemic when a person could only meet people from up to six other households and working from home was advised. In a statement, a spokesperson for the department said "steps had been taken" after the UN Security Council campaign team "briefly let their guard down", blaming "a moment of happiness" for the incident and insisting that "lessons have been learned".

The Iveagh House party was compared to the Golfgate scandal by People Before Profit TD Paul Murphy, who said it undermined the public health effort, and those involved seemed to believe the rules only applied to "little people", while Independent TD Michael McNamara criticised the department for "hypocrisy".

On 16 January 2022, Minister for Foreign Affairs Simon Coveney ordered an investigation into the gathering. On 31 January, an investigation found that a "serious breach" of social distancing rules occurred. The former Secretary General Niall Burgess, who was responsible for the photograph, was asked to make a donation to a charity providing assistance to people affected by COVID-19 in the amount of €2,000, while three other senior officials were asked to make a donation in the amount of €1,000.

== Instances of isolation and testing ==
=== 2020 ===
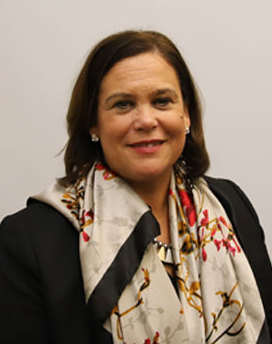
Mary Lou McDonald

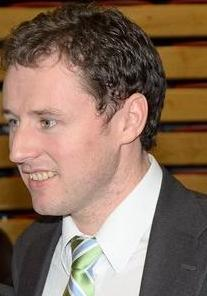
Charlie McConalogue

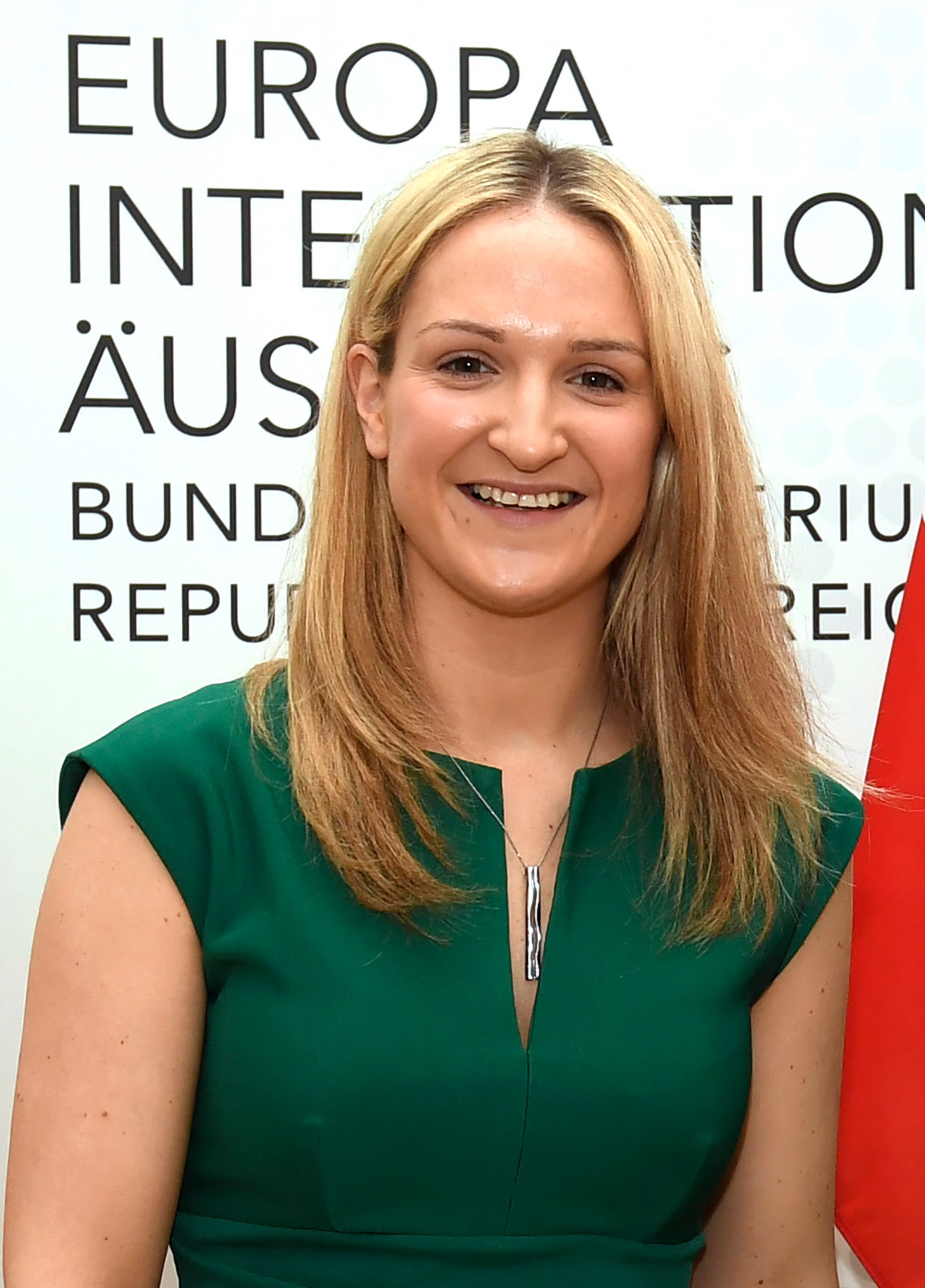
Helen McEntee

McDonald (Sinn Féin), McConalogue (Fianna Fáil) and McEntee (Fine Gael) were the first TDs from their respective parties to confirm they had contracted COVID-19.

On 16 March, Thomas Pringle, an independent TD representing the Donegal constituency, entered isolation due to previous contact with someone in Dublin and the high risk to his own personal health.

On 18 March, Luke 'Ming' Flanagan, the independent MEP representing the Midlands–North-West constituency, announced that he and his family would begin self-isolating after his daughter exhibited symptoms of COVID-19.

On 19 March, it was reported that Minister for Housing, Planning and Local Government Eoghan Murphy had been in self-isolation for the past week after returning from a visit abroad to see family. Murphy had set off before travel advice against doing so was issued and—while he had "not been in direct physical contact with any colleagues"—he, nevertheless, was well enough to continue his work remotely.

On 23 March, Tánaiste Simon Coveney revealed he had tested negative for COVID-19. He underwent the test after being contact traced via the positive result of Claire Byrne, whom he had sat beside on live television less than two weeks previously. It was believed that Coveney was the first member of the Varadkar cabinet to be tested for the virus.

On 14 April (the day after the Easter Monday public holiday), President of Sinn Féin Mary Lou McDonald confirmed she had tested positive for COVID-19.

On 23 April, President of Sinn Féin Mary Lou McDonald announced that she had recovered from COVID-19. She gave an interview to Ryan Tubridy on The Late Late Show the following night, in which one COVID-19 positive person interviewed another COVID-19 positive person for television viewers nationwide.

On 3 June, it was revealed that Minister for Health Simon Harris had self-isolated for several days after developing symptoms of the virus; a test returned a negative result.

On 15 September, Ceann Comhairle Seán Ó Fearghaíl announced that the entire government would have to restrict their movements after Minister for Health Stephen Donnelly reported feeling unwell and contacted his GP for a COVID-19 test. The Department of Health confirmed that Acting Chief Medical Officer Ronan Glynn was also restricting his movements as he had met members of the government on 14 September, while Minister of State for European Affairs Thomas Byrne had gone into self-isolation after getting tested for COVID-19. The Leader of the Green Party and Minister for Climate Action, Communication Networks and Transport Eamon Ryan previously self-isolated while a member of his household awaited results of a COVID-19 test. Just after 9 pm, it was announced that Minister for Health Stephen Donnelly tested negative for COVID-19 and that the government no longer needed to restrict their movements.

On 23 September, Tánaiste Leo Varadkar, Minister for Foreign Affairs Simon Coveney and Minister for Finance Paschal Donohoe were among the three cabinet ministers who began to restrict their movements under COVID-19 public health advice. Varadkar was informed that he was a close contact of someone who tested positive for COVID-19, and subsequently took a test which returned negative. Coveney restricted his movements after attending meetings in Brussels, while Donohoe restricted his movements after attending a meeting of EU finance ministers in Berlin and subsequently took a test which returned negative. Donohoe was deemed a close contact of Bruno Le Maire, the French Finance Minister, who tested positive for COVID-19 on 18 September.

On 24 October, four Fine Gael senators (Tim Lombard, Jerry Buttimer, Emer Currie, Garret Ahearn) were reported to have begun self-isolating after two tested positive for COVID-19. Currie later confirmed she was one of the two, and that her positive result had caused the other three to isolate.

On 17 December, Taoiseach Micheál Martin tested negative for COVID-19 following an announcement that he was restricting his movements after coming into close contact with French President Emmanuel Macron, who had tested positive for COVID-19.

On 23 December, all ministers in the Government restricted their movements after it emerged that Minister for Agriculture, Food and the Marine Charlie McConalogue had tested positive for COVID-19. McConalogue was tested after returning from Brussels on 17 December. The result was negative. He then went shopping in Dublin city centre hours ahead of a scheduled five-day follow-up COVID-19 test which led to the positive result McConalogue received "sometime between 10.30am and 11am" on 23 December. He displayed no symptoms and isolated in his native County Donegal.

=== 2021 ===
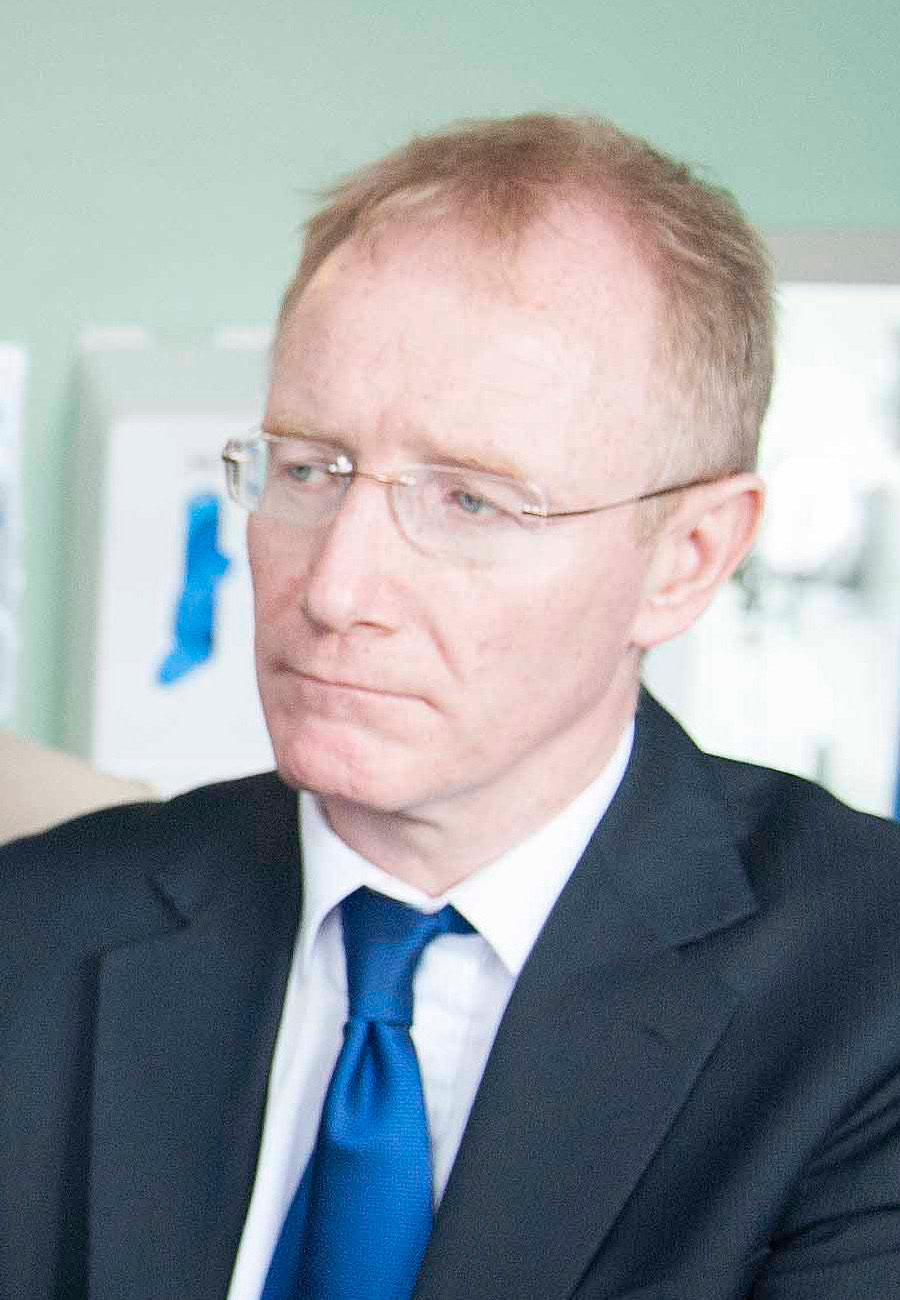
Frank Feighan

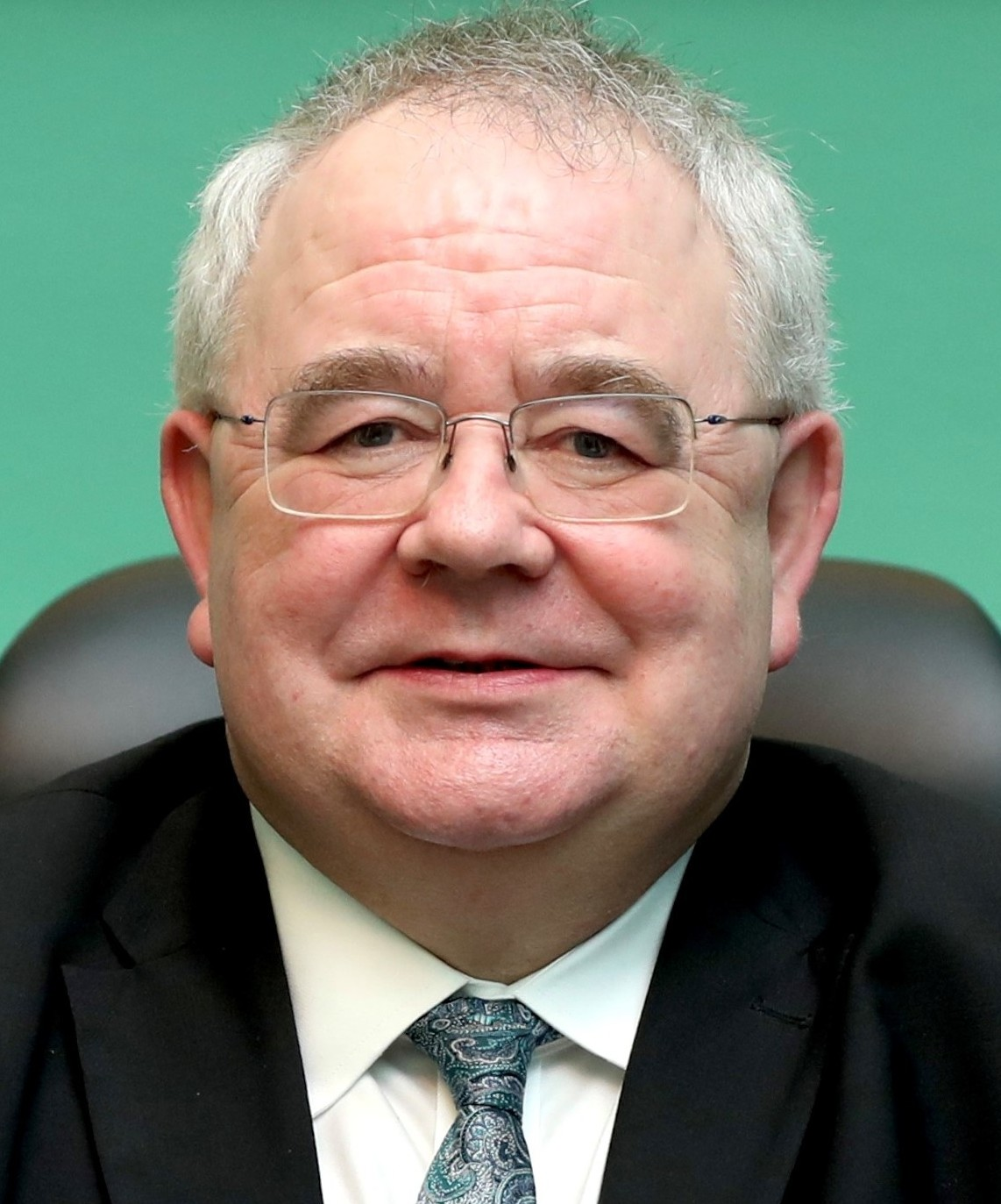
Seán Ó Fearghaíl

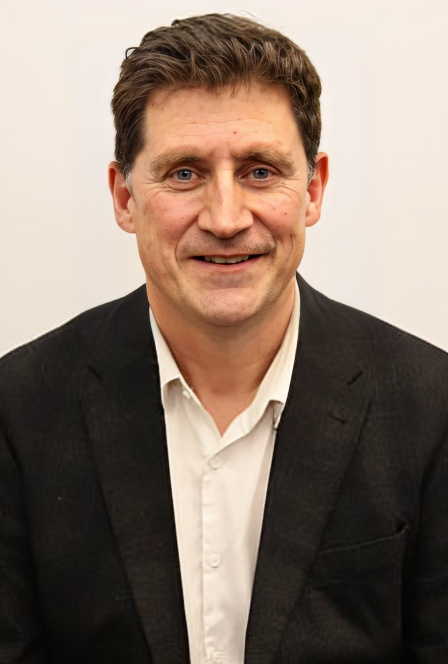
Eamon Ryan

Feighan (Fine Gael), Ó Fearghaíl (Fianna Fáil) and Ryan (Green Party) contracted COVID-19 in 2021.

Shortly after 11 am on the morning of 6 January 2021, Minister for Justice Helen McEntee announced on Twitter that she had tested positive for COVID-19 but intended to work remotely while isolating.

On 13 October, Minister for Health Stephen Donnelly announced that he was self-isolating after experiencing mild symptoms.

On 6 November, Minister for the Environment, Climate and Communications Eamon Ryan tested positive for COVID-19 and cancelled his trip to the COP26 conference in Glasgow. The next day, it was confirmed that he tested negative after taking a second test and would now travel to COP26.

On 7 November, Minister of State for Public Health, Well Being and National Drugs Strategy Frank Feighan experienced symptoms of COVID-19 and a positive test result was announced the next day.

On 22 November 2021, Ceann Comhairle Seán Ó Fearghaíl began self-isolating and working from home after testing positive for COVID-19. Leas-Cheann Comhairle Catherine Connolly took over his duties.

On 19 December, Minister for the Environment, Climate and Communications Eamon Ryan began self-isolating after testing positive for COVID-19.

=== 2022 ===
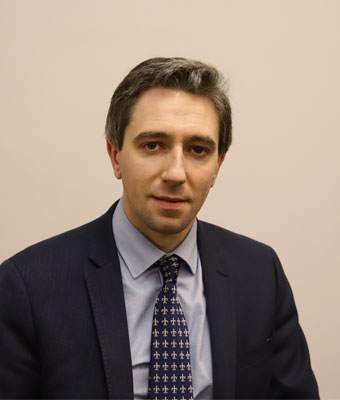
Simon Harris

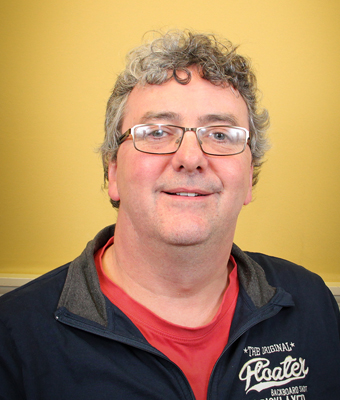
Thomas Pringle

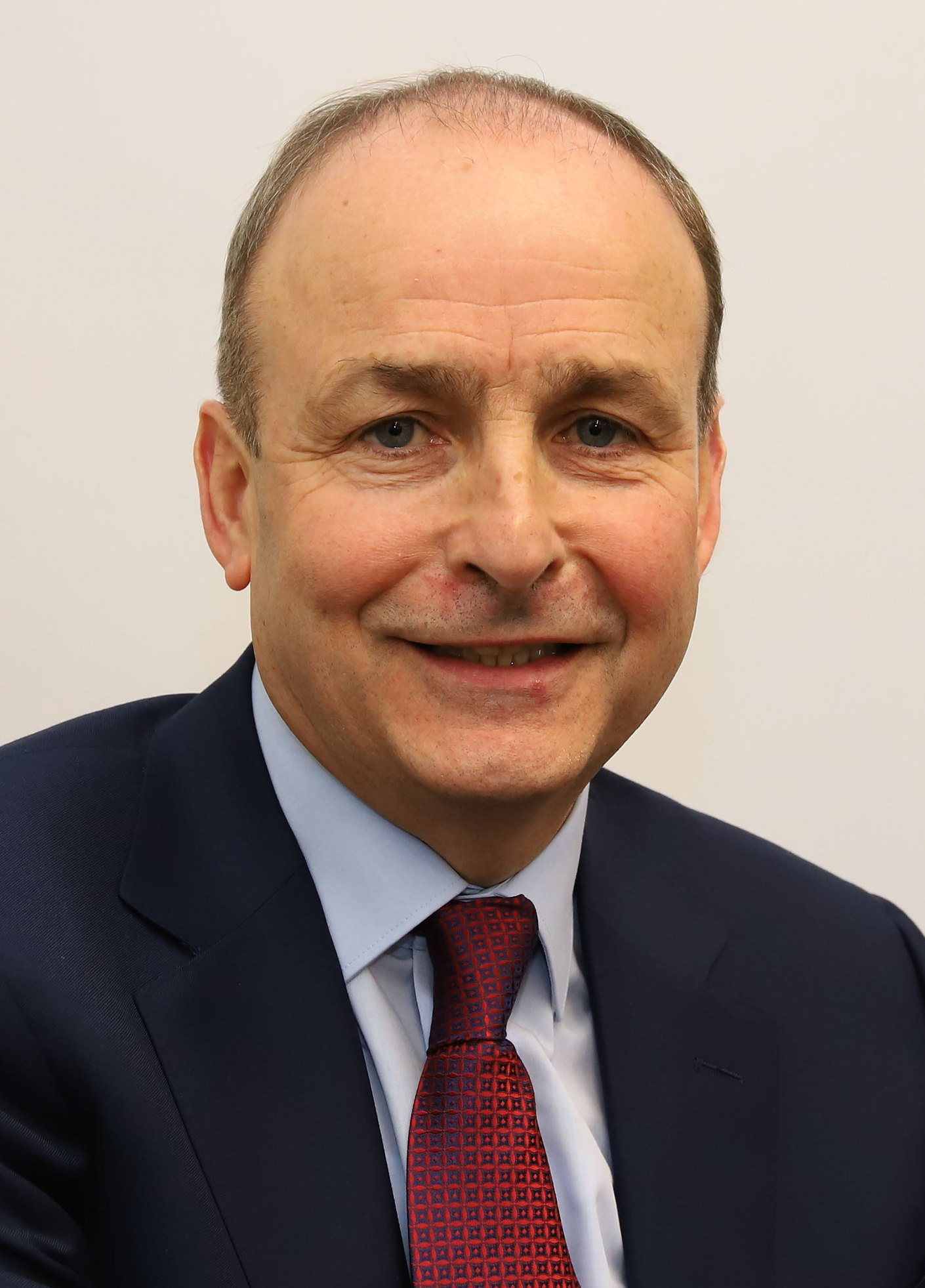
Micheál Martin

Harris (Fine Gael), Pringle (Independent) and Martin (Fianna Fáil) all contracted COVID-19 in the same week of March 2022.

On 11 March 2022, Minister for Further and Higher Education, Research, Innovation and Science Simon Harris began working from home after testing positive for COVID-19.

On 12 March, Thomas Pringle announced he had tested positive for COVID-19 and would be isolating for seven days.

Late on 16 March, Taoiseach Micheál Martin tested positive for COVID-19 while he was at an event in Washington being held for St Patrick's Day. This meant Martin could not personally meet President of the United States Joe Biden at the White House as planned the next day. Biden and Martin met virtually instead, with Martin isolating in Blair House. Martin said he would chair the next cabinet meeting from the Irish embassy in Washington.

Minister for Agriculture, Food and the Marine Charlie McConalogue had been due to travel to Canada for St Patrick's Day in March 2022. However, he later confirmed that a positive COVID-19 test had prevented him from doing so. His period of isolation elapsed in time for him to sit on the "VIP lorry" at the parade in Buncrana.

On 23 March, Minister for Justice Helen McEntee tested positive for COVID-19, while Minister for Health Stephen Donnelly began self-isolating at home due to flu-like symptoms.

Two days later, on 25 March, Tánaiste Leo Varadkar cancelled a number of engagements in Cork and began self-isolating after testing positive for COVID-19.

On 13 June, Minister for the Environment, Climate and Communications Eamon Ryan tested positive for COVID-19 a second time.
