= Frontbench team of Micheál Martin =

- General: 2016; 2020; 2024
- Presidential: 2011; 2018; 2025
- Local: 2014; 2019; 2024
- European: 2014; 2019; 2024

These are the front benches of Micheál Martin from 2011 until the present day.

== Initial front bench ==
This was announced on 31 January 2011. The biggest surprise was the inclusion of then unknown and unelected Averil Power. Jim O'Callaghan, at this time a local politician known only for being a brother of RTÉ personality Miriam O'Callaghan, was also included.

- Micheál Martin - Leader and Spokesperson on Northern Ireland
- Mary Hanafin - Deputy Leader and Spokesperson on Environment
- Brian Lenihan Jnr^{1} - Spokesperson on Finance
- Averil Power^{4} - Spokesperson on Political Reform
- Michael McGrath - Spokesperson on Financial Sector Reform
- Seán Fleming - Spokesperson on Public Sector Reform
- John Curran - Spokesperson on Justice and Law Reform
- Niall Collins - Spokesperson on Defence
- Dara Calleary - Spokesperson on Enterprise, Employment & Innovation
- John McGuinness - Spokesperson on Small Business
- Mary Coughlan^{1} - Spokesperson on Education and Skills
- Willie O'Dea - Spokesperson on Communications, Energy & Natural Resources
- Brendan Smith - Spokesperson on Agriculture, Fisheries & Food
- Billy Kelleher - Spokesperson on Transport
- Peter Power - Spokesperson on Foreign Affairs & Trade
- Marc McSharry^{2} - Spokesperson on Tourism & Arts
- Darragh O'Brien - Spokesperson on Sport
- Pat Carey - Spokesperson on Community, Equality & Gaeltacht Affairs
- Éamon Ó Cuív^{1} - Spokesperson on Social Protection
- Mary Fitzpatrick^{3} - Spokesperson on Housing & Urban Development
- Barry Andrews - Spokesperson on Health and Children
- Jim O'Callaghan^{3} - Spokesperson on Constitutional Reform and Legal Adviser
- ^{1} Then minister with responsibility for this area
- ^{2} Then a Senator
- ^{3} Then a local politician
- ^{4} Not then in public office

== 2011 post-election reshuffle ==
Following the 2011 general election, a number of members of Martin's front bench lost their seats, meaning a reshuffle was necessary. This was announced on 12 April 2011.

- Micheál Martin - Leader and Spokesperson on Northern Ireland
- Brian Lenihan Jnr - Deputy Leader and Spokesperson on Finance
- Michael McGrath - Spokesperson on Public Expenditure & Financial Sector Reform
- Seán Fleming - Spokesperson on Public Sector Reform
- Dara Calleary - Spokesperson on Justice, Equality & Defence
- John McGuinness - Spokesperson on Small Business & Regulatory Framework (also Fianna Fáil nominee for Chair of the Public Accounts Committee)
- Brendan Smith - Spokesperson on Education and Skills
- Éamon Ó Cuív - Spokesperson on Communications, Energy & Natural Resources
- Michael Moynihan - Spokesperson on Agriculture and Food
- John Browne - Spokesperson on Marine & Fisheries
- Seamus Kirk - Spokesperson on Horticulture & Rural Affairs
- Timmy Dooley - Spokesperson on Transport, Tourism and Sport
- Robert Troy - Spokesperson on Arts & Heritage
- Niall Collins - Spokesperson on Environment, Community & Local Government
- Michael Kitt - Spokesperson on Housing, Planning & Gaeltacht Affairs
- Barry Cowen - Spokesperson on Social Protection
- Billy Kelleher - Spokesperson on Health
- Charlie McConalogue - Spokesperson on Children
- Jim O'Callaghan^{1} - Legal Adviser
- ^{1} Then a local politician

== 2011 minor reshuffle due to death of Brian Lenihan ==
Deputy Leader and Spokesperson on Finance Brian Lenihan Jnr died in office in the early hours of 10 June 2011. Éamon Ó Cuív was named Deputy Leader in his place and Michael McGrath, then Spokesperson on Public Expenditure & Financial Sector Reform, was appointed Spokesperson on Finance. Seán Fleming combined McGrath's previous role with his own, Spokesperson on Public Sector Reform.

- Micheál Martin - Leader and Spokesperson on Northern Ireland
- Éamon Ó Cuív - Deputy Leader and Spokesperson on Communications, Energy & Natural Resources
- Michael McGrath - Spokesperson on Finance
- Seán Fleming - Spokesperson on Public Expenditure & Reform
- Dara Calleary - Spokesperson on Justice, Equality & Defence
- John McGuinness - Spokesperson on Small Business & Regulatory Framework (also Fianna Fáil nominee for Chair of the Public Accounts Committee)
- Brendan Smith - Spokesperson on Education and Skills
- Michael Moynihan - Spokesperson on Agriculture and Food
- John Browne - Spokesperson on Marine & Fisheries
- Seamus Kirk - Spokesperson on Horticulture & Rural Affairs
- Timmy Dooley - Spokesperson on Transport, Tourism and Sport
- Robert Troy - Spokesperson on Arts & Heritage
- Niall Collins - Spokesperson on Environment, Community & Local Government
- Michael Kitt - Spokesperson on Housing, Planning & Gaeltacht Affairs
- Barry Cowen - Spokesperson on Social Protection
- Billy Kelleher - Spokesperson on Health
- Charlie McConalogue - Spokesperson on Children
- Jim O'Callaghan^{1} - Legal Adviser
- ^{1} Then a local politician

== 2012 reshuffle ==
Deputy Leader Éamon Ó Cuív soon fell out with Leader Micheál Martin and left his post. While Ó Cuív served on the backbenches the post of Deputy Leadership was vacant. On 12 June 2012, Martin announced another reshuffle but declined to give anyone the position of Deputy Leader. Ten changes were made in total.

- Micheál Martin - Leader and Spokesperson on Northern Ireland
- Michael McGrath - Spokesperson on Finance
- Seán Fleming - Spokesperson on Public Expenditure & Reform
- Niall Collins - Spokesperson on Justice & Equality
- Seán Ó Fearghaíl - Chief Whip and Spokesperson on Constitutional Reform and Arts & Culture and Defence
- John McGuinness - Spokesperson on Small Business & Regulatory Framework
- Dara Calleary - Spokesperson on Enterprise, Jobs & Innovation
- Charlie McConalogue - Spokesperson on Education & Skills
- Barry Cowen - Spokesperson on Environment
- Michael Moynihan - Spokesperson on Communications, Energy & Natural Resources
- Éamon Ó Cuív - Spokesperson on Agriculture
- John Browne - Spokesperson on Marine & Fisheries
- Seamus Kirk - Spokesperson on Horticulture & Rural Affairs
- Timmy Dooley - Spokesperson on Transport, Tourism and Sport
- Brendan Smith - Spokesperson on Foreign Affairs & Trade
- Michael Kitt - Spokesperson on Housing, Planning & Gaeltacht Affairs
- Willie O'Dea - Spokesperson on Social Protection & Equality
- Billy Kelleher - Spokesperson on Health
- Robert Troy - Spokesperson on Children
- Jim O'Callaghan^{1} - Legal Adviser
- ^{1} Then a local politician

== 2016 reshuffle ==
Following the 2016 general election and government formation, Martin announced these spokespeople on 18 May. Those no longer serving included Colm Keaveney, who lost his seat, and Seán Ó Fearghaíl, elected to the role of Ceann Comhairle. In a new departure, a number of women were included.

- Micheál Martin - Leader and Spokesperson on Northern Ireland
- Michael Moynihan - Fianna Fáil Whip
- Michael McGrath - Spokesperson on Finance
- Dara Calleary - Spokesperson on Public Expenditure and Reform
- Jim O'Callaghan - Spokesperson on Justice and Equality
- Lisa Chambers - Spokesperson on Defence
- Niall Collins - Spokesperson on Jobs, Enterprise and Innovation
- Thomas Byrne - Spokesperson on Education and Skills
- Timmy Dooley - Spokesperson on Communications, Environment and Natural Resources
- Charlie McConalogue - Spokesperson on Agriculture, Food and the Marine
- Éamon Ó Cuív - Spokesperson on Regional Development, Rural Affairs and the Gaeltacht
- Robert Troy - Spokesperson on Transport, Tourism and Sport
- Darragh O'Brien - Spokesperson on Foreign Affairs and Trade
- Barry Cowen - Spokesperson on Housing, Planning and Local Government
- Willie O'Dea - Spokesperson on Social Protection
- Billy Kelleher - Spokesperson on Health
- Anne Rabbitte - Spokesperson on Children and Youth Affairs
- Niamh Smyth - Spokesperson on Arts and Heritage
- Margaret Murphy O'Mahony - Spokesperson on Disability
- James Browne - Spokesperson on Mental Health
- John Lahart - Spokesperson on Dublin
- Senator Catherine Ardagh - Fianna Fáil Leader in the Seanad

== 2018 reshuffle ==
Following a period of underperformance in opinion polls a reshuffle took place on 29 March 2018.

- Micheál Martin - Leader and Spokesperson on Northern Ireland
