= Denis Naughten =

Irish former politician (born 1973)

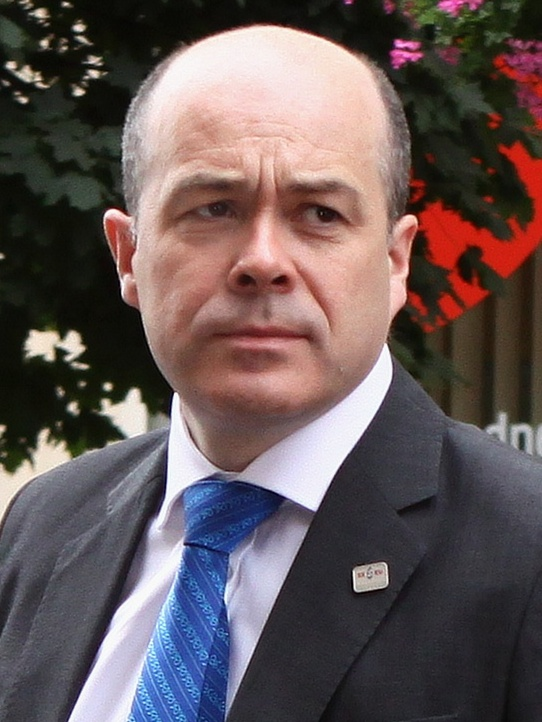
- Naughten in 2016

Chair Committee on Social Protection, Community and Rural Development and the Islands
- In office 15 September 2020 – 8 November 2024
- Preceded by: Fiona O'Loughlin
- Succeeded by: John Paul O'Shea

Minister for Communications, Climate Action and Environment
- In office 6 May 2016 – 11 October 2018
- Taoiseach: Enda Kenny; Leo Varadkar
- Preceded by: Alex White
- Succeeded by: Richard Bruton

Teachta Dála
- In office February 2016 – November 2024
- Constituency: Roscommon–Galway
- In office May 2007 – February 2016
- Constituency: Roscommon–South Leitrim
- In office June 1997 – May 2007
- Constituency: Longford–Roscommon

Senator
- In office 28 January 1997 – 6 June 1997
- Constituency: Agricultural Panel

Personal details
- Born: 23 June 1973 (age 53) Drum, County Roscommon, Ireland
- Party: Independent
- Other political affiliations: Fine Gael (until 2011)
- Spouse: Mary Tiernan (m. 1999)
- Children: 4
- Parent: Liam Naughten (father)
- Education: University College Dublin; University College Cork
- Website: denisnaughten.ie

Denis Naughten (born 23 June 1973) is an Irish former independent politician who served as a Teachta Dála (TD) for Roscommon–Galway from 2016 to 2024, and previously from 2007 to 2016 for Roscommon–South Leitrim and from 1997 to 2007 for Longford–Roscommon. He was appointed Chair of the Committee on Social Protection, Community and Rural Development and the Islands in September 2020. He previously served as Minister for Communications, Climate Action and Environment from 2016 to 2018. He was a Senator for the Agricultural Panel from January 1997 to June 1997.

He was elected as a Fine Gael TD but sat as an independent from July 2011, having lost the Fine Gael parliamentary party whip.

== Family and early life ==
Naughten was born in Drum, County Roscommon, in 1973. He was educated at St. Aloysius College, Athlone, University College Dublin and University College Cork, where he studied for a PhD in Food Microbiology, but did not complete it. His father, Liam Naughten, was also a Fine Gael TD and Senator. His brother, John Naughten, was a Fine Gael county councillor.

== Political career ==
Naughten was elected at a by-election to Seanad Éireann in 1997, to the seat vacant since the death of his father. Following, the 1997 general election, he was elected to Dáil Éireann as a Fine Gael TD for the Longford–Roscommon constituency and was re-elected at the 2002 general election. He was also a member of Roscommon County Council and the Western Health Board from January 1997 to October 2003.

Within his first few weeks in the Dáil, he became Fine Gael Spokesperson on Youth Affairs, School Transport and Adult Education. Between 2000 and 2001, he served as Spokesperson on Enterprise, Trade and Employment. Naughten declined to stand in the party's leadership election in 2002, having at first indicated an interest in standing. He was later appointed Spokesperson on Transport. He was Spokesperson on Agriculture from 2004 to 2007.

He was re-elected at the 2007 general election for the new constituency of Roscommon–South Leitrim. He was Spokesperson on Immigration and Integration from 2007 to 2010. In June 2010, he supported Richard Bruton's leadership challenge to Enda Kenny. Following Kenny's victory in a motion of confidence, Naughten was not re-appointed to the front bench. In October 2010, he was appointed Deputy Spokesperson on Health, with special responsibility for Primary Care and Disability.

He was re-elected at the 2011 general election. He voted against the government's decision to close the Roscommon County Hospital emergency department on 6 July 2011. He lost the Fine Gael party whip the following day. On 13 September 2013, he and six other expellees formed the Reform Alliance, described as a "loose alliance" rather than a political party. He was re-elected for Roscommon–Galway at the 2016 general election.

Naughten was appointed as Minister for Communications, Climate Action and Environment in Taoiseach Enda Kenny's Fine Gael/Independent minority government after two months of negotiation following the 2016 general election. He later resigned from this post on 11 October 2018, following controversy surrounding a series of meetings he attended with the leading bidder for his department's National Broadband Plan that occurred during the project's procurement process. He was succeeded by Richard Bruton.

He stood for election for Ceann Comhairle at the first sitting of the 33rd Dáil on 20 February 2020, but was defeated by Seán Ó Fearghaíl. Naughten was subsequently named by Leo Varadkar as Leas-Cheann Comhairle on an acting basis due to a deferred election caused by the COVID-19 pandemic.

On 13 February 2023, he announced that he would not contest the next general election.

Elections to the Dáil
Party	Election		FPv	FPv%	Result
Fine Gael	Longford–Roscommon	1997	6,652	14.1	Elected on count 7/8
Fine Gael	Longford–Roscommon	2002	6,660	13.4	Elected on count 8/10
Fine Gael	Roscommon–South Leitrim	2007	8,928	19.4	Elected on count 4/4
Fine Gael	Roscommon–South Leitrim	2011	9,320	19.6	Elected on count 6/6
Independent Alliance	Roscommon–Galway	2016	13,936	30.5	Elected on count 1/8
Independent	Roscommon–Galway	2020	8,422	18.5	Elected on count 5/6

== See also ==
- Families in the Oireachtas

Honorary titles
Preceded by Mildred Fox	Baby of the Dáil; 1997–2002	Succeeded by Damien English
Political offices
Preceded by Alex White as Minister for Communications, Energy and Natural Resources	Minister for Communications, Climate Action and Environment; 2016–2018	Succeeded by Richard Bruton

Dáil	Election	Deputy (Party)	Deputy (Party)	Deputy (Party)	Deputy (Party)
27th	1992	Albert Reynolds (FF)	Seán Doherty (FF)	Tom Foxe (Ind.)	John Connor (FG)
28th	1997	Albert Reynolds (FF)	Seán Doherty (FF)	Louis Belton (FG)	Denis Naughten (FG)
29th	2002	Peter Kelly (FF)	Michael Finneran (FF)	Mae Sexton (PDs)	Denis Naughten (FG)
30th	2007	Constituency abolished. See Longford–Westmeath and Roscommon–South Leitrim			

Dáil	Election	Deputy (Party)	Deputy (Party)	Deputy (Party)
30th	2007	Michael Finneran (FF)	Frank Feighan (FG)	Denis Naughten (FG)
31st	2011	Luke 'Ming' Flanagan (Ind.)	Frank Feighan (FG)	Denis Naughten (FG)
31st	2014 by-election	Michael Fitzmaurice (Ind.)	Frank Feighan (FG)	Denis Naughten (FG)
32nd	2016	Constituency abolished. See Roscommon–Galway and Sligo–Leitrim		

Dáil	Election	Deputy (Party)	Deputy (Party)	Deputy (Party)
32nd	2016	Eugene Murphy (FF)	Denis Naughten (Ind.)	Michael Fitzmaurice (Ind.)
33rd	2020	Claire Kerrane (SF)	Denis Naughten (Ind.)	Michael Fitzmaurice (Ind.)
34th	2024	Claire Kerrane (SF)	Martin Daly (FF)	Michael Fitzmaurice (II)
