= 2016 Ceann Comhairle election =

Parliamentary election in Ireland

10 March 2016	2020 →
- Turnout: 99.4%
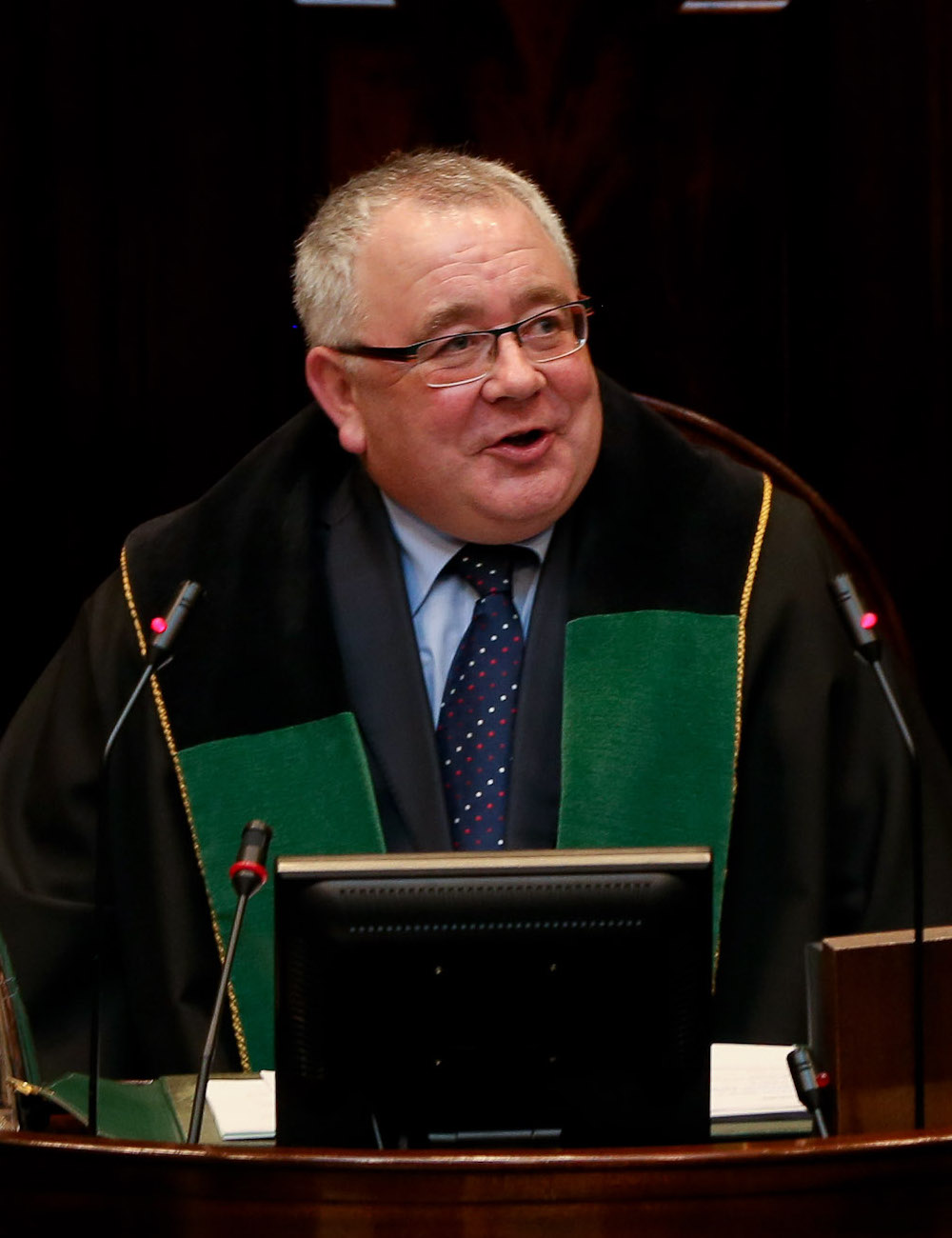

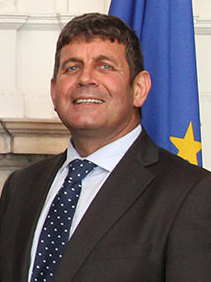

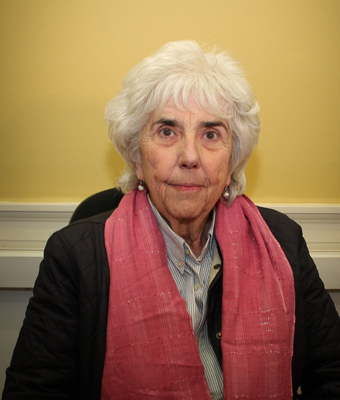

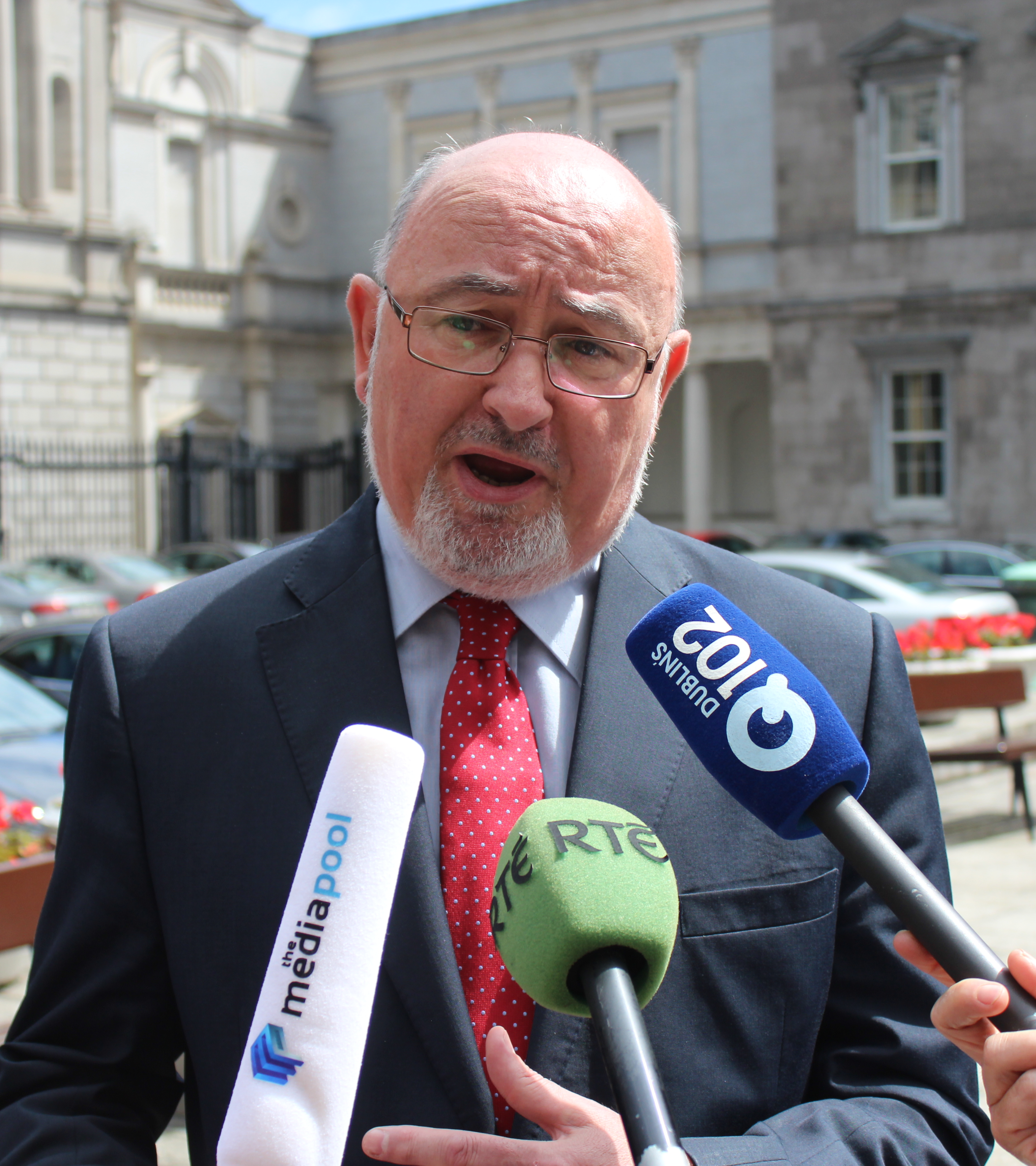

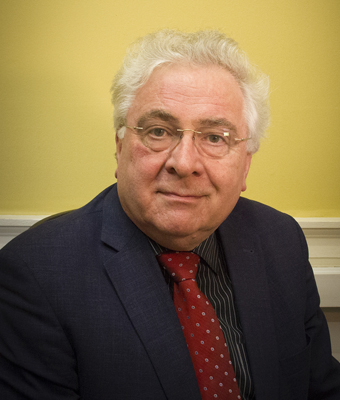
Nominee	Seán Ó Fearghaíl	Andrew Doyle	Maureen O'Sullivan
Party	Fianna Fáil	Fine Gael	Independent
1st preference	56 (35.7%)	32 (20.4%)	24 (15.3%)
2nd count	60 (38.2%)	48 (30.6%)	25 (15.9%)
3rd count	61 (40.4%)	48 (31.8%)	42 (27.8%)
4th count	74 (56.5%)	58 (43.9%)	Eliminated
Final count	95 (78.5%)	Eliminated
Nominee	Caoimhghín Ó Caoláin	Bernard Durkan
Party	Sinn Féin	Fine Gael
1st preference	24 (15.3%)	21 (13.4%)
2nd count	24 (15.3%)	Eliminated
3rd count	Eliminated
Ceann Comhairle before election
Seán Barrett
Fine Gael
Elected Ceann Comhairle
Seán Ó Fearghaíl
Fianna Fáil

The 2016 election of the Ceann Comhairle took place on 10 March 2016 at the commencement of the 32nd Dáil. It was the first election to be performed by secret ballot.

== Rules ==
Under the new rules for the election of the Ceann Comhairle, introduced during the ante-penultimate sitting of the 31st Dáil on 28 January 2016, candidates must be nominated by at least seven members of Dáil Éireann. Each member was allowed to nominate only one candidate. Nominations had to be submitted to the Clerk of the Dáil by 18:00 on 9 March 2016 in order to be valid, but could be withdrawn at any time up to the close of nominations.

As more than one candidate was nominated, the Dáil voted by secret ballot in order of preference after the candidates' speeches, with an absolute majority required for victory. As no candidate won a majority on first preferences, the individual with the fewest votes was eliminated and their votes redistributed in accordance with their next highest preference, under the single transferable vote system. (Note: Single-winner STV is, in effect, equivalent to instant runoff voting.) Eliminations and redistributions continued until one member received the requisite absolute majority. Then, the House voted on a formal motion to appoint the member in question to the position of Ceann Comhairle. The Clerk of the Dáil was the presiding officer of the House during the election process.

== Candidates ==
The Ceann Comhairle of the 31st Dáil, Seán Barrett, said he would not seek re-election to the position. Fine Gael's John Deasy was reported to be interested in the role. Fianna Fáil selected Seán Ó Fearghaíl as their candidate at a parliamentary meeting on 7 March 2016. Ó Fearghaíl overcame Pat "the Cope" Gallagher, John McGuinness, Michael Moynihan and Brendan Smith to get the nomination. Sinn Féin selected Caoimhghín Ó Caoláin. The Independent Alliance was also reported to be in "serious discussions" about selecting a candidate. Maureen O'Sullivan emerged as a contender after she announced her interest in the role and was named favourite to succeed by The Irish Times.

== Result ==
2016 election: Ceann Comhairle
Party	Candidate	FPv%	Count				
Party	Candidate	FPv%	1	2	3	4	5
Fianna Fáil	Seán Ó Fearghaíl	35.7%	56	60	61	74	95
Fine Gael	Andrew Doyle	20.4%	32	48	48	58	
Independent	Maureen O'Sullivan	15.3%	24	25	42		
Sinn Féin	Caoimhghín Ó Caoláin	15.3%	24	24			
Fine Gael	Bernard Durkan	13.4%	21				
Electorate: 158 Valid: 157 Spoilt: 0 Quota: 79 Turnout: 99.4%

First preference vote
Ó Fearghail	35.7%
Doyle	20.4%
O'Sullivan	15.3%
Ó Caoláin	15.3%
Durkan	13.4%

Final percentage
Ó Fearghail	78.5%
