= 2020 Irish general election =

Election to the 33rd Dáil

- 8 February 2020

160 seats in Dáil Éireann (Note: Including Seán Ó Fearghaíl (FF), returned automatically for Kildare South as outgoing Ceann Comhairle, under Art. 16.6 of the Constitution and the Electoral Act 1992.) (Note: The last election was for a Dáil with 158 seats.) 81 seats needed for a majority
- Opinion polls
- Turnout: 62.7% ▼2.4 pp
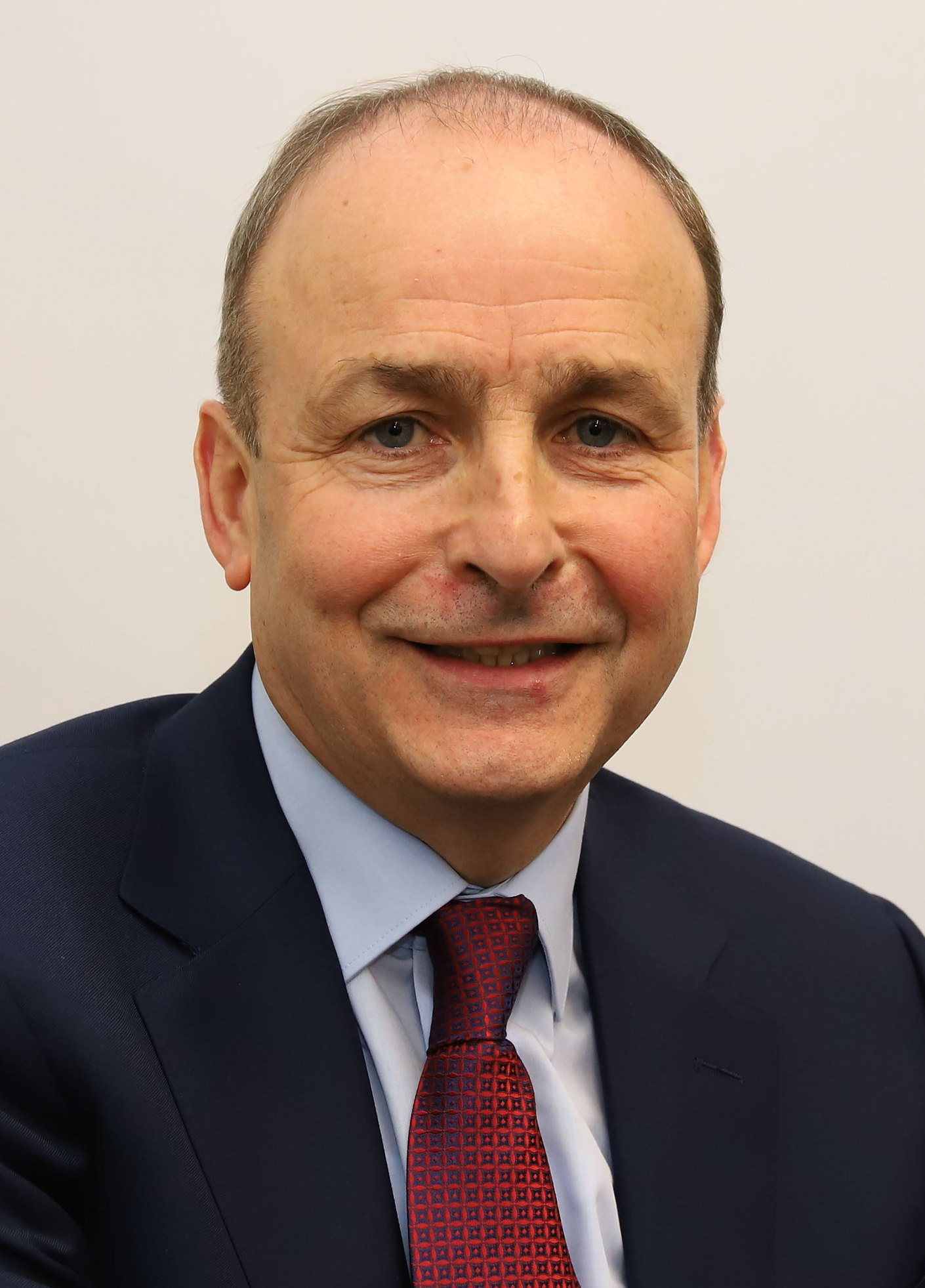

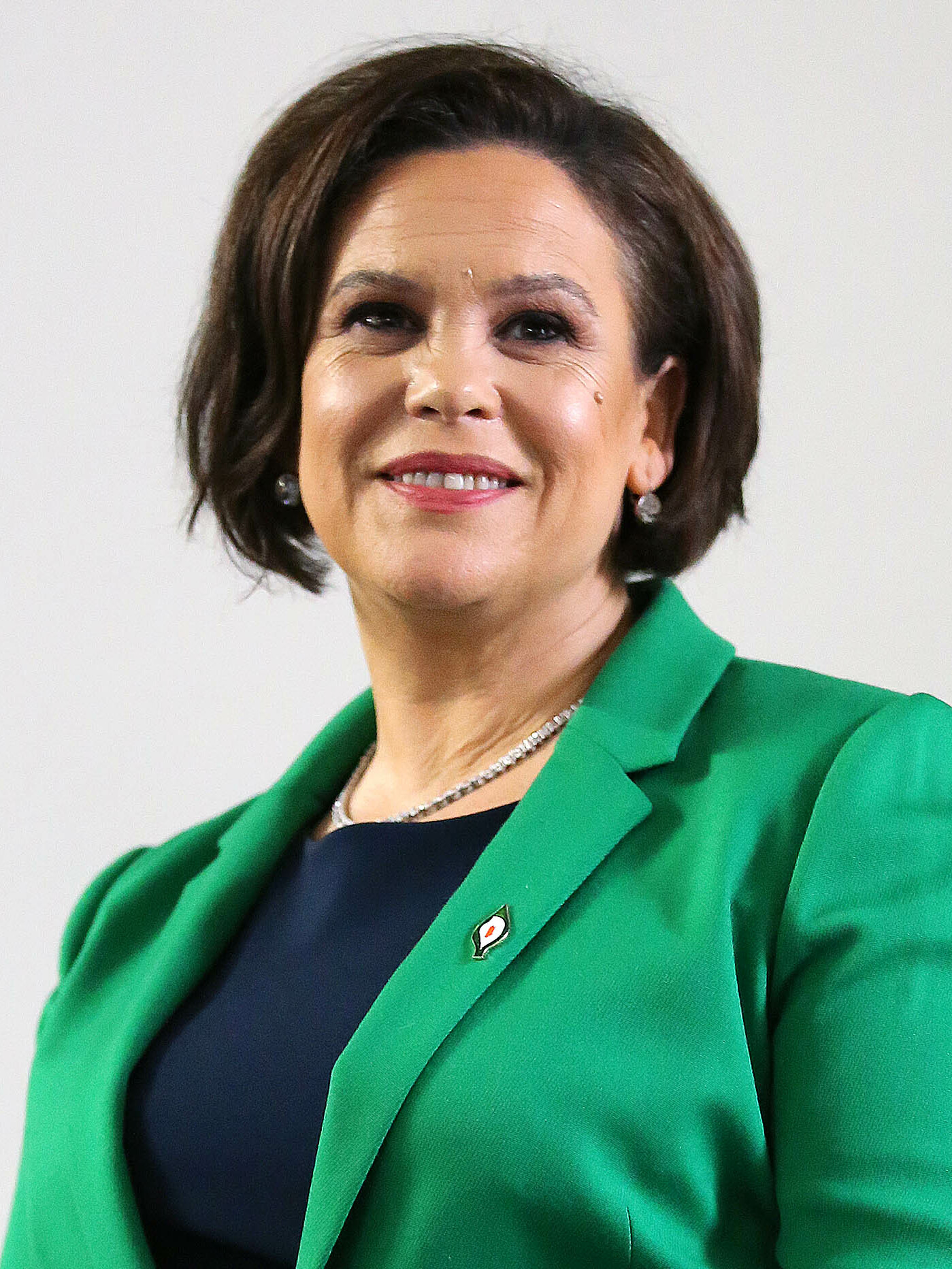

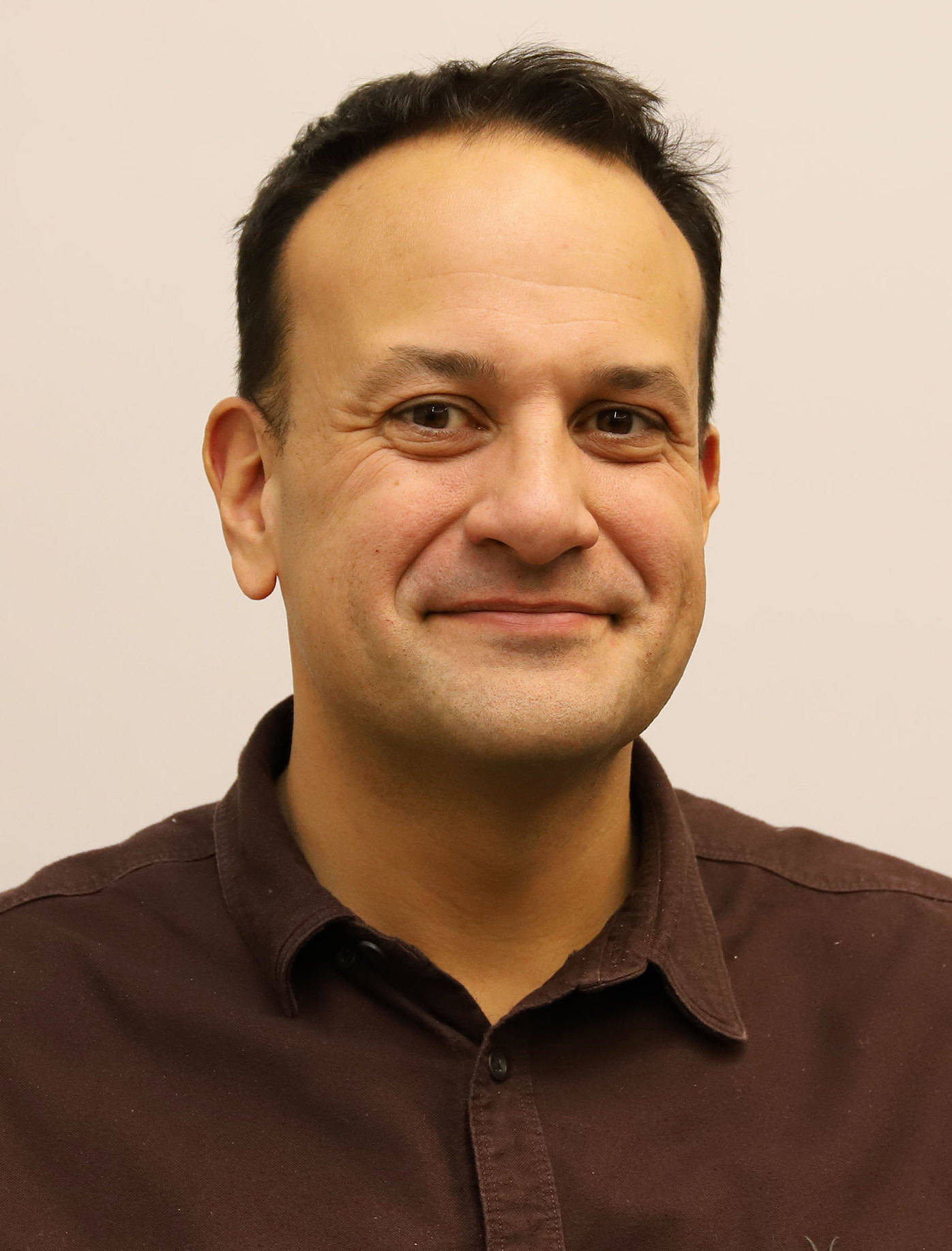

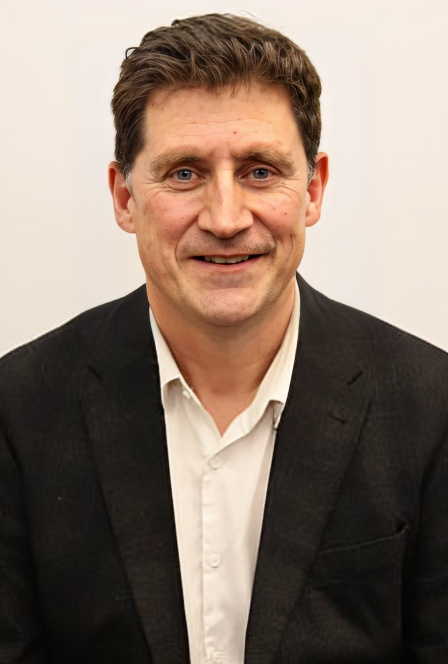

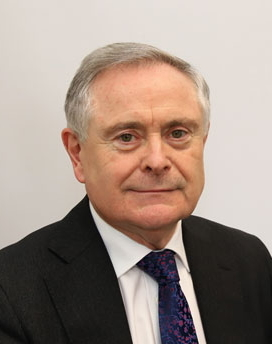

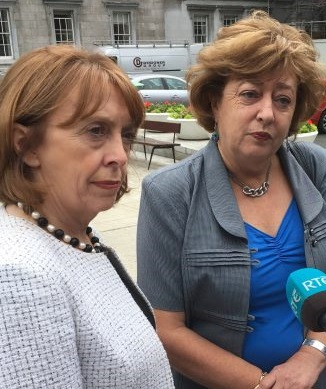

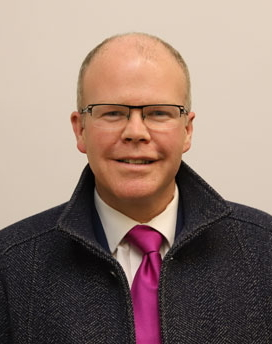
| | First party | Second party | Third party |
|---|---|---|---|
| Leader | Micheál Martin | Mary Lou McDonald | Leo Varadkar |
| Party | Fianna Fáil | Sinn Féin | Fine Gael |
| Leader since | 26 January 2011 | 10 February 2018 | 2 June 2017 |
| Leader's seat | Cork South-Central | Dublin Central | Dublin West |
| Last election | 44 seats, 24.3% | 23 seats, 13.8% | 50 seats, 25.5% |
| Seats won | 38 | 37 | 35 |
| Seat change | ▼6 | ▲14 | ▼15 |
| Popular vote | 484,320 | 535,595 | 455,584 |
| Percentage | 22.2% | 24.5% | 20.9% |
| Swing | ▼2.1 pp | ▲10.7 pp | ▼4.7 pp |
| | Fourth party | Fifth party | Sixth party |
| Leader | Eamon Ryan | Brendan Howlin | Catherine Murphy; Róisín Shortall |
| Party | Green | Labour | Social Democrats |
| Leader since | 27 May 2011 | 20 May 2016 | 15 July 2015 |
| Leader's seat | Dublin Bay South | Wexford | Kildare North; Dublin North-West |
| Last election | 2 seats, 2.7% | 7 seats, 6.6% | 3 seats, 3.0% |
| Seats won | 12 | 6 | 6 |
| Seat change | ▲10 | ▼1 | ▲3 |
| Popular vote | 155,700 | 95,588 | 63,404 |
| Percentage | 7.1% | 4.4% | 2.9% |
| Swing | ▲4.4 pp | ▼2.2 pp | ▼0.1 pp |
| | Seventh party | Eighth party | Ninth party |
| | S–PBP | | I4C |
| Leader | Collective leadership | Peadar Tóibín | None |
| Party | Solidarity–PBP | Aontú | Inds. 4 Change |
| Leader since | N/A | 28 January 2019 | N/A |
| Leader's seat | N/A | Meath West | N/A |
| Last election | 6 seats, 3.9% | Did not exist | 4 seats, 1.5% |
| Seats won | 5 | 1 | 1 |
| Seat change | ▼1 | New | ▼3 |
| Popular vote | 57,420 | 40,917 | 8,421 |
| Percentage | 2.6% | 1.9% | 0.4% |
| Swing | ▼1.3 pp | New | ▼1.1 pp |
Taoiseach before election
Leo Varadkar
Fine Gael
Taoiseach after election
Micheál Martin
Fianna Fáil

The 2020 Irish general election took place on Saturday 8 February, to elect the 33rd Dáil, the lower house of Ireland's parliament. The election was called following the dissolution of the 32nd Dáil by the president, at the request of the Taoiseach, Leo Varadkar, on 14 January 2020. The members, Teachtaí Dála (TDs), were elected by single transferable vote in multi-seat constituencies. It was the first election since 1918 to be held on a weekend. Following the election, Fine Gael and Fianna Fáil entered into a historic coalition government.

The election was an unprecedented three-way race, with the three largest parties each winning a share of the vote between 20% and 25%. Fianna Fáil finished with 38 seats (including one TD returned automatically as outgoing Ceann Comhairle). Sinn Féin made significant gains; it received the most first-preference votes, and won 37 seats, the party's best result since 1923. Fine Gael, the governing party led by Varadkar, came third both in seats (35) and in first-preference votes. International news outlets have described the result as a historic break from the two-party system, as it was the first time in almost a century that neither Fianna Fáil nor Fine Gael won the most votes. Furthermore, the combined vote share of the two traditional main parties fell to a historic low. The leaders of those parties had long ruled out forming a coalition government with Sinn Féin.

The 33rd Dáil first met on 20 February. The outgoing Ceann Comhairle, Seán Ó Fearghaíl of Fianna Fáil, was re-elected, reducing to 37 the number of Fianna Fáil TDs. Four candidates were proposed for the position of Taoiseach, but none were successful. Varadkar formally resigned as Taoiseach that day as he was constitutionally obliged to do, but he and the other members of the government continued to carry out their duties until the appointment of their successors. Negotiations to form a new government continued through to June, impacted by the arrival of the COVID-19 pandemic in Ireland. A Programme for Government agreed by Fianna Fáil, Fine Gael and the Green Party was published on 15 June 2020. On 26 June, all three parties voted to enter government under the Programme for Government. On 27 June, Micheál Martin was appointed as Taoiseach and formed a new government. The parties agreed that in December 2022, Varadkar would serve again as Taoiseach.

== Background ==
Since the 2016 Irish general election, Fine Gael had led a minority government with the support of Independent TDs, including the Independent Alliance. It relied on a confidence and supply agreement with Fianna Fáil.

On 3 December 2019, a motion of no confidence in the Minister for Housing, Planning and Local Government Eoghan Murphy proposed by Catherine Murphy for the Social Democrats was defeated, with 53 votes in favour to 56 votes against and 35 registered abstentions. On 9 January 2020, Independent TD Michael Collins called for a motion of no confidence in the Minister for Health Simon Harris. On 14 January, Taoiseach Leo Varadkar sought a dissolution of the Dáil which was granted by the president, with the 33rd Dáil to convene on 20 February at 12 noon. The election was set for 8 February, the first time a general election was held on a Saturday since 1918.

== Electoral system ==
Members of Dáil Éireann known as TDs (Dáil deputies) were elected by single transferable vote (STV) from 39 constituencies with between three and five seats. Voters complete a paper ballot, numbering candidates 1, 2, 3, etc. in order of their preference. Ballot boxes are sent to the constituency count centre after polls close and are counted the following morning. Voters may mark as many or as few preferences as they wish. Each ballot is initially credited to its first-preference candidate but if the first preference candidate is elected or eliminated on later counts, the vote may be transferred to the next usable preference, in which case it is not used to elect the candidate marked as the first preference. (The vote is only used to elect one candidate in the end or none at all.) The whole-vote method is used for transfers of surplus votes held by elected candidates. As the outgoing Ceann Comhairle, Seán Ó Fearghaíl, did not announce his retirement, he was automatically returned, and the remaining 159 of the 160 seats were up for election.

=== Constituency boundary changes ===
A Constituency Commission, convened in July 2016 under the provisions of the Electoral Act 1997 with High Court judge Robert Haughton as chair, made recommendations on changes to constituency boundaries after publication of initial population data from the 2016 census. The commission had some discretion but was constitutionally bound to allow no more than a ratio of 30,000 people per elected member, and was required by law to recommend constituencies of three, four or five seats, and to avoid – as far as was practicable – breaching county boundaries. The Commission report, released on 27 June 2017, recommended an increase in the number of TDs from 158 to 160 elected in 39 constituencies. These changes were implemented by the Electoral (Amendment) (Dáil Constituencies) Act 2017. The election of the 33rd Dáil was therefore held using the new boundaries, for 160 seats.

== Retiring incumbents ==
The following members of the 32nd Dáil did not seek re-election.

| Constituency | Departing TD (Note: On 19 May 2018, Dara Murphy of Cork North-Central announced his intention to retire at the next general election. However, he subsequently resigned from Dáil Éireann on 3 December 2019, leaving his seat vacant at dissolution.) | Party | First elected | Date confirmed |
|---|---|---|---|---|
| Cavan–Monaghan | Caoimhghín Ó Caoláin | Sinn Féin | 1997 | 7 March 2018 |
| Clare | Michael Harty | Independent | 2016 | 13 January 2020 |
| Cork North-Central | Jonathan O'Brien | Sinn Féin | 2011 | 6 January 2020 |
| Cork South-West | Jim Daly | Fine Gael | 2011 | 20 September 2019 |
| Dublin Bay North | Tommy Broughan | Independent | 1992 | 22 January 2020 |
| Dublin Bay North | Finian McGrath | Independent | 2002 | 14 January 2020 |
| Dublin Central | Maureen O'Sullivan | Independent | 2009 | 16 January 2020 |
| Dublin Fingal | Brendan Ryan | Labour Party | 2011 | 8 January 2020 |
| Dún Laoghaire | Maria Bailey | Fine Gael | 2016 | 22 January 2020 |
| Dún Laoghaire | Seán Barrett | Fine Gael | 1981 | 6 December 2019 |
| Kerry | Martin Ferris | Sinn Féin | 2002 | 18 November 2017 |
| Limerick City | Michael Noonan | Fine Gael | 1981 | 18 May 2017 |
| Longford–Westmeath | Willie Penrose | Labour Party | 1992 | 5 July 2018 |
| Louth | Gerry Adams | Sinn Féin | 2011 | 18 November 2017 |
| Mayo | Enda Kenny | Fine Gael | 1975 | 5 November 2017 |
| Sligo–Leitrim | Tony McLoughlin | Fine Gael | 2011 | 28 June 2018 |
| Waterford | John Deasy | Fine Gael | 2002 | 28 November 2017 |
| Waterford | John Halligan | Independent | 2011 | 15 January 2020 |

== Campaign ==
Dáil constituencies used in the 2020 election.

The campaign officially began after the dissolution of Dáil Éireann on 14 January 2020 and lasted until polling day on 8 February 2020. the Polling was just over a week after the United Kingdom (which includes Northern Ireland) withdrew from the European Union, making it the first major election to be held within the EU after Brexit. The election took place on a Saturday for the first time since the 1918 election. Leo Varadkar said that the change of day was to prevent school closures (many schools in Ireland are used as polling stations) and to make it easy for third-level students and those working away from home to vote.

Nomination of candidates closed on Wednesday, 22 January. A record number of women were nominated, with 162 of the 531 candidates. This was the first Irish general election in which there was a female candidate running in every constituency. If a party does not have a minimum of 30% male and 30% female candidates, it forfeits half of their state funding. At close of nominations, Fine Gael had 30.5% female candidates, Fianna Fáil had 31%, Labour had 32%, Sinn Féin had 33%, People Before Profit had 38%, the Green Party had 41%, and the Social Democrats had 57%, all passing the quota.

Parties contesting a general election for the first time included Aontú, the Irish Freedom Party, the National Party and RISE (as part of S–PBP).

Voter registration via the Supplementary Register of Voters closed on 23 January, with very high registration taking place on the last day – Dublin City Council, for example, reporting 3,500 registrations on the final day allowed, and a total of 14,000 additional registrations, reported to be twice the normal amount for a general election.

On 3 February 2020, the returning officer for Tipperary cancelled the writ of election there, as required by Section 62 of the Electoral Act 1992, after the death of candidate Marese Skehan. However, the Minister for Housing, Planning and Local Government formed a view that the 1992 provision breached the constitutional requirement that elections take place within 30 days of a Dáil dissolution, so on 5 February he issued a Special Difficulty Order allowing the election to proceed on the same date as other constituencies. Skehan's name remained on the ballot paper.

=== Party manifestos and slogans ===
| Party/group | | Manifesto (external link) | Other slogan(s) | Refs |
|---|---|---|---|---|
| Fine Gael | | A future to Look Forward to | "Building a Republic of Opportunity, Taking Ireland Forward Together." | |
| Fianna Fáil | | An Ireland for all / Éire do chách | | |
| Sinn Féin | | Giving workers & families a break | "Time for change", "Standing up for Irish unity" | |
| Labour Party | | Building an equal society | | |
| S–PBP (Note: People Before Profit, Solidarity and RISE contested this election as Solidarity–People Before Profit. People Before Profit had 27 candidates, Solidarity had 9 candidates, and RISE had 1 candidate. They issued separate manifestos.) | People Before Profit | Planet Before Profit | "Socialism for the 21st century" | |
| S–PBP | Solidarity | Planet Before Profit | "Real change, not spare change" | |
| S–PBP | RISE | Planet Before Profit | | |
| Social Democrats | | Hope for better. Vote for better. | "Invest in better" | |
| Green Party | | Want Green? Vote Green! | "The future belongs to all of us" | |
| Aontú | | The political system is broken. Let's fix it. | "Think outside the political cartel" | |

=== Television debates ===
2020 Irish general election debates
| Date | Broadcaster | Moderator(s) | Participants — Name Participant N Party not invited/did not participate | | | | | | | | Notes |
| Date | Broadcaster | Moderator(s) | FG | FF | SF | Lab | S–PBP | GP | SD | Aon | Notes |
|---|---|---|---|---|---|---|---|---|---|---|---|
| 22 Jan | Virgin One | Pat Kenny | Varadkar | Martin | N | N | N | N | N | N | |
| 27 Jan | RTÉ One | Claire Byrne | Varadkar | Martin | McDonald | Howlin | Boyd Barrett | Ryan | Shortall | N | |
| 30 Jan | Virgin One | Ivan Yates; Matt Cooper | Varadkar | Martin | McDonald | Howlin | Barry | Ryan | Murphy | N | |
| 4 Feb | RTÉ One | David McCullagh; Miriam O'Callaghan | Varadkar | Martin | McDonald | N | N | N | N | N | |
| 6 Feb | RTÉ One | David McCullagh; Miriam O'Callaghan | N | N | N | Howlin | Coppinger | Ryan | Shortall | Tóibín | |
| 6 Feb | Virgin Media | Ivan Yates; Matt Cooper | Coveney | Calleary | Doherty | N | N | N | N | N | Debate among Deputy Leaders |
| 6 Feb | TG4 | Páidí Ó Lionáird | Kyne | Calleary | Ó Laoghaire | N | Ó Ceannabháin | Garvey | Ó Tuathail | Mhic Gib | Debate in Irish |

The first leaders' debate took place on Virgin Media One on 22 January, but was restricted to Leo Varadkar and Micheál Martin.

A leaders' debate featuring seven party leaders/representatives took place on RTÉ One on Monday 27 January, from NUI Galway.

On 27 January, RTÉ published an article explaining its rationale as to whom it invited to appear in televised leadership debates. Aontú announced that it would seek a High Court injunction to prevent the broadcast of the leaders' debate scheduled for the same day but later in the day they announced that they would not proceed with the action.

A further RTÉ debate was scheduled for 4 February, again on RTÉ One, and featuring only Varadkar and Martin. Mary Lou McDonald, leader of Sinn Féin, had objected to her exclusion, and Sinn Féin threatened legal action if it was excluded from this debate. On 3 February, RTÉ announced that it had invited McDonald to participate in the final debate, in part due to Sinn Féin's standing in recent opinion polls, and Sinn Féin confirmed that it would accept the invitation.

A final debate between the leader of smaller parties took place on 6 February on RTÉ One.

== Opinion polls ==
Opinion polls on voting intentions were conducted regularly. Polls were published on an approximately monthly basis by The Sunday Business Post (which uses the Red C polling company) and The Sunday Times (which used the Behaviour and Attitudes polling company for all of its polls since 2016 until its final poll prior to the election, for which it used Panelbase).

Less frequent polls were published by The Irish Times, Sunday Independent, Irish Mail on Sunday, RTÉ News, and others.

The chart below depicts the results of opinion polls since the previous general election.

Graph of opinion polls conducted. Trend lines represent local regressions.

== Results ==
Map showing the party winning the most first-preference votes in each constituency.

Polls opened at 7 am UTC and closed at 10 pm. The total poll was down by 2.2% to 62.9% compared to the previous election, despite it being held on a Saturday. However, severe weather warnings were in place over much of the country due to Storm Ciara.

Counting of the votes commenced at 9 am on 9 February and concluded at 11:59 pm on 10 February, with Galway East being the first constituency to report and Cavan–Monaghan being the last constituency to report.

The result showed a close contest between three parties. Fianna Fáil won 38 seats (including Seán Ó Fearghaíl returned automatically as outgoing Ceann Comhairle), six fewer than in 2016. Sinn Féin won 37 seats, a gain of fifteen over the previous election. Fine Gael, the party of Taoiseach Leo Varadkar, won 35 seats, a fall of 15 from the 2016 election. Among the smaller parties, the Green Party showed the largest gains, increasing from three to twelve seats, a gain of nine over the previous election. Sinn Féin received the most first-preference votes nationwide, finishing a close second in seats. No single party secured more than 25% of the first-preference votes, nor more than 25% of the seats. According to Dublin City University political scientist Eoin O'Malley, it was the most fragmented Dáil ever, with the effective number of parties at 5.95.

Journalists commented on the effects of Sinn Féin's late surge and unexpectedly high first-preference vote. John Drennan listed eleven constituencies where it might have won another seat had it run an extra candidate. Marie O'Halloran observed that Sinn Féin transfers affected the outcome of 21 constituencies, favouring other left-wing parties. Sean Murray noted that Solidarity–People Before Profit benefited most from Sinn Féin transfers.

The Green Party also had their best-ever result, with 12 seats, reflecting increased interest in environmentalism and climate change in Ireland.

The Social Democrats had their best-ever result, with 6 seats; they attributed this to focusing their efforts on winnable seats rather than fielding candidates in every constituency.

Minor far-right and anti-immigration parties (the National Party, Irish Freedom Party and Anti-Corruption Ireland) fared very poorly, winning less than two percent wherever they stood. However, some independent politicians who had expressed anti-immigration views were elected, like Verona Murphy and Noel Grealish.

Election to the 33rd Dáil – 8 February 2020
| Party | Leader | First-preference votes | | | Seats | | | | |
| Party | Leader | Votes | % FPv (Note: Parties are entitled to public funding proportionate to their first-preference vote (subject to a minimum 2% FPv).) | Swing (pp) | Cand. | 2016 | Out. | Elected 2020 | Change |
|---|---|---|---|---|---|---|---|---|---|
| Fianna Fáil | Micheál Martin | 484,315 | 22.18 | ▼1.96 | 84 | 44 | 45 | 38 | ▼6 |
| Sinn Féin | Mary Lou McDonald | 535,573 | 24.53 | ▲10.80 | 42 | 23 | 22 | 37 | ▲14 |
| Fine Gael | Leo Varadkar | 455,568 | 20.86 | ▼4.43 | 82 | 50 (Note: Including Seán Barrett, returned automatically in 2016 for Dún Laoghaire as outgoing Ceann Comhairle.) | 47 | 35 | ▼15 |
| Green | Eamon Ryan | 155,695 | 7.13 | ▲4.43 | 39 | 2 | 3 | 12 | ▲10 |
| Labour | Brendan Howlin | 95,582 | 4.38 | ▼2.17 | 31 | 7 | 7 | 6 | ▼1 |
| Social Democrats | Catherine Murphy; Róisín Shortall | 63,397 | 2.90 | ▼0.08 | 20 | 3 | 2 | 6 | ▲3 |
| Solidarity–PBP •People Before Profit •Solidarity •RISE | Collective leadership | 57,420 40,220; 12,723; 4,477 | 2.63 1.84; 0.58; 0.21 | ▼1.28 ▼0.12 ▼1.37 new | 37 27; 9; 1 | 6 3; 3 new | 6 3; 2; 1 | 5 3; 1; 1 | ▼1 ▼2 new |
| Aontú | Peadar Tóibín | 41,575 | 1.90 | new | 26 | New | 1 | 1 | ▲1 |
| Inds. 4 Change | None | 8,421 | 0.39 | ▼1.07 | 4 | 4 | 1 | 1 | ▼3 |
| Irish Freedom | Hermann Kelly | 5,495 | 0.25 | new | 11 | New | 0 | 0 | Steady |
| Renua | Vacant | 5,473 | 0.25 | ▼1.91 | 11 | 0 | 0 | 0 | Steady |
| National Party | Justin Barrett | 4,773 | 0.22 | new | 10 | New | 0 | 0 | Steady |
| Irish Democratic | Ken Smollen | 2,611 | 0.12 | ▲0.07 | 1 | 0 | 0 | 0 | Steady |
| Workers' Party | Michael Donnelly | 1,195 | 0.05 | ▼0.10 | 4 | 0 | 0 | 0 | Steady |
| United People | Jeff Rudd | 43 | <0.01 | new | 1 | New | 0 | 0 | Steady |
| Independent | — | 266,353 | 12.20 | ▼3.7 (Note: The 2016 figures include 4.2% first-preference votes and six TDs from the Independent Alliance, which is not a political party.) | 125 | 19 | 22 | 19 | Steady |
| Vacant | —N/a | —N/a | —N/a | —N/a | —N/a | —N/a | 1 | —N/a | —N/a |
| Total Valid | | 2,183,489 | 99.20 | | | | | | |
| Spoilt votes | | 17,703 | 0.80 | | | | | | |
| Total | | 2,201,192 | 100 | — | 552 | 158 | 158 | 160 | ▲2 |
| Registered voters/Turnout | | 3,509,969 | 62.71 | | | | | | |

=== Voting summary ===
First preference vote share of different parties in the election.
1. Sinn Féin (24.5%)
2. Fianna Fáil (22.2%)
3. Fine Gael (20.9%)
4. Green (7.10%)
5. Labour (4.40%)
6. Social Democrats (2.90%)
7. Solidarity–PBP (2.60%)
8. Aontú (1.90%)
9. Inds. 4 Change (0.40%)
10. Other (13.1%)

First-preference vote share
| Sinn Féin | 24.5% |
| Fianna Fáil | 22.2% |
| Fine Gael | 20.9% |
| Green | 7.1% |
| Labour | 4.4% |
| Social Democrats | 2.9% |
| Solidarity–People Before Profit | 2.6% |
| Aontú | 1.9% |
| Independents 4 Change | 0.4% |
| Others | 0.9% |
| Independent | 12.2% |

First-preference vote share of constituencies contested
| Sinn Féin | 25.1% |
| Fianna Fáil | 22.2% |
| Fine Gael | 20.9% |
| Green | 7.1% |
| Social Democrats | 6.2% |
| Labour | 5.5% |
| Independents 4 Change | 3.5% |
| Solidarity–People Before Profit | 3.3% |
| Aontú | 2.9% |
| Others | 1.2% |
| Independent | 12.4% |

=== Vote transfers summary ===
Summary of vote transfers
| Party | Surplus (1st count) | | Surplus (Later count) | | Elimination | |
|---|---|---|---|---|---|---|
| Party | Counts | Votes | Counts | Votes | Counts | Votes |
| Sinn Féin | 27 | 120,595 | 4 | 2,762 | 3 | 18,990 |
| Fianna Fáil | | | 5 | 4,986 | 32 | 124,173 |
| Fine Gael | 2 | 2,702 | 4 | 8,117 | 38 | 171,759 |
| Independent | 4 | 7,343 | 5 | 9,200 | 77 | 131,727 |
| Green Party | 1 | 969 | 2 | 989 | 23 | 90,082 |
| Labour | | | 1 | 417 | 25 | 68,602 |
| Social Democrats | | | 2 | 2,336 | 13 | 33,770 |
| Solidarity–PBP | | | 3 | 5,843 | 29 | 57,009 |
| Aontú | | | | | 25 | 43,831 |
| Independents 4 Change | | | | | 2 | 6,882 |
| Irish Freedom Party | | | | | 11 | 7,744 |
| Renua | | | | | 11 | 6,484 |
| National Party | | | | | 10 | 5,900 |
| Irish Democratic Party | | | | | 1 | 3,941 |
| Workers Party | | | | | 4 | 1,626 |
| United People | | | | | 1 | 97 |
| Totals | 34 | 131,609 | 26 | 34,650 | See note below | 772,617 |

Note: Elimination counts often include multiple candidates. There were 253 counts at which candidates were eliminated — these often included candidates from different parties

=== Seats summary ===
Share of Dáil seats of different parties in the election.
1. Fianna Fáil (23.7%)
2. Sinn Féin (23.1%)
3. Fine Gael (21.9%)
4. Green (7.50%)
5. Labour (3.80%)
6. Social Democrats (3.80%)
7. Solidarity–PBP (3.10%)
8. Aontú (0.60%)
9. Inds. 4 Change (0.60%)
10. Other (11.9%)

Dáil seats
| Fianna Fáil | 23.7% |
| Sinn Féin | 23.1% |
| Fine Gael | 21.9% |
| Green | 7.5% |
| Labour | 3.8% |
| Social Democrats | 3.8% |
| Solidarity–PBP | 3.1% |
| Aontú | 0.6% |
| Independents 4 Change | 0.6% |
| Independent | 11.9% |

=== TDs who lost their seats ===
| Party | Seats lost | Name | Constituency | Other offices held | Year elected |
|---|---|---|---|---|---|
| Fianna Fáil | 16 | Bobby Aylward | Carlow–Kilkenny | | 2007 (Note: Aylward lost his seat in 2011 but regained it in 2015.) |
| Fianna Fáil | 16 | John Brassil | Kerry | | 2016 |
| Fianna Fáil | 16 | Declan Breathnach | Louth | | 2016 |
| Fianna Fáil | 16 | Malcolm Byrne | Wexford | | 2019 |
| Fianna Fáil | 16 | Pat Casey | Wicklow | | 2016 |
| Fianna Fáil | 16 | Shane Cassells | Meath West | | 2016 |
| Fianna Fáil | 16 | Lisa Chambers | Mayo | | 2016 |
| Fianna Fáil | 16 | John Curran | Dublin Mid-West | | 2002 (Note: Curran lost his seat in 2011 but regained it in 2016.) |
| Fianna Fáil | 16 | Timmy Dooley | Clare | | 2007 |
| Fianna Fáil | 16 | Pat "the Cope" Gallagher | Donegal | Leas-Cheann Comhairle | 2016 (Note: Gallagher was previously a TD from 1981 to 1997, and from 2002 to 2009.) |
| Fianna Fáil | 16 | Eugene Murphy | Roscommon–Galway | | 2016 |
| Fianna Fáil | 16 | Margaret Murphy O'Mahony | Cork South-West | | 2016 |
| Fianna Fáil | 16 | Kevin O'Keeffe | Cork East | | 2016 |
| Fianna Fáil | 16 | Fiona O'Loughlin | Kildare South | | 2016 |
| Fianna Fáil | 16 | Frank O'Rourke | Kildare North | | 2016 |
| Fianna Fáil | 16 | Eamon Scanlon | Sligo–Leitrim | | 2007 (Note: Scanlon lost his seat in 2011 but regained it in 2016.) |
| Fine Gael | 12 | Pat Breen | Clare | Minister of State at the Department of Business, Enterprise and Innovation | 2002 |
| Fine Gael | 12 | Catherine Byrne | Dublin South-Central | Minister of State for Health Promotion | 2007 |
| Fine Gael | 12 | Marcella Corcoran Kennedy | Laois–Offaly | | 2011 |
| Fine Gael | 12 | Michael W. D'Arcy | Wexford | Minister of State at the Department of Finance | 2007 (Note: D'Arcy lost his seat in 2011 but regained it in 2016.) |
| Fine Gael | 12 | Pat Deering | Carlow–Kilkenny | | 2011 |
| Fine Gael | 12 | Regina Doherty | Meath East | Minister for Employment Affairs and Social Protection | 2011 |
| Fine Gael | 12 | Andrew Doyle | Wicklow | Minister of State at the Department of Agriculture, Food and the Marine | 2007 |
| Fine Gael | 12 | Seán Kyne | Galway West | Government Chief Whip | 2011 |
| Fine Gael | 12 | Mary Mitchell O'Connor | Dún Laoghaire | Minister of State at the Department of Education | 2011 |
| Fine Gael | 12 | Tom Neville | Limerick County | | 2016 |
| Fine Gael | 12 | Kate O'Connell | Dublin Bay South | | 2016 |
| Fine Gael | 12 | Noel Rock | Dublin North-West | | 2016 |
| Labour | 2 | Joan Burton | Dublin West | | 1992 (Note: Burton lost her seat in 1997 but regained it in 2002.) |
| Labour | 2 | Jan O'Sullivan | Limerick City | | 1998 |
| Solidarity–PBP | 1 | Ruth Coppinger | Dublin West | | 2014 |
| Independent | 4 | Séamus Healy | Tipperary | | 2000 (Note: Healy lost his seat in 2007 but regained it in 2011.) |
| Independent | 4 | Shane Ross | Dublin Rathdown | Minister for Transport, Tourism and Sport | 2011 |
| Independent | 4 | Kevin "Boxer" Moran | Longford–Westmeath | Minister of State at the Department of Public Expenditure and Reform | 2016 |
| Independent | 4 | Katherine Zappone | Dublin South-West | Minister for Children and Youth Affairs | 2016 |
| Total | 35 | — | — | — | — |

== Government formation ==
With 160 TDs in the 33rd Dáil (including the Ceann Comhairle who casts a vote only in the case of a tie), 80 TDs were needed to form a governing coalition. A smaller group could form a minority government if they negotiated a confidence and supply agreement with another party.

During the campaign, the leaders of both Fine Gael and Fianna Fáil had ruled out forming a coalition government with Sinn Féin. Some in Fianna Fáil were reported to favour going into coalition with Sinn Féin over renewing an arrangement with Fine Gael. Sinn Féin leader Mary Lou McDonald announced her intention to try to form a coalition government without either Fine Gael or Fianna Fáil, but she did not rule out a coalition with either party. After the results came in on 10–11 February, Leo Varadkar continued to rule out a Fine Gael coalition with Sinn Féin, while Micheál Martin changed tack and left open the possibility of a Fianna Fáil–Sinn Féin coalition or a grand coalition with Fine Gael. On 12 February, Varadkar conceded that Fine Gael would likely go into opposition. Varadkar argued that since Sinn Féin achieved the highest vote, it had the responsibility to build a coalition that allows it to keep its campaign promises, and that Fine Gael was "willing to step back" to allow Sinn Féin to do so.

Sinn Féin stated an intention to form a broad left coalition; combined, left-leaning parties have 67 seats (37 Sinn Féin, 12 Green, 6 Labour, 6 Social Democrats, 5 Solidarity–PBP, and 1 Independents 4 Change), but other parties of the left have raised doubts about such a prospect. In addition, Sinn Féin would have needed the support of at least 13 independents (out of 19 total) to form a government.

A Fianna Fáil–Fine Gael coalition would have had 73 seats and so needed support from smaller parties or independents to form a government. A Fianna Fáil–Sinn Féin coalition would have had 74 seats, which would also have required smaller party or independent support. These three options in an opinion poll the week after the election received respective support from 26%, 26%, and 19% of voters, with 15% preferring another election.

On 20 February, the new Dáil met for the first time. The Fianna Fáil number dropped to 37 when Ó Fearghaíl was re-elected as Ceann Comhairle on the first day of the 33rd Dáil. No candidate for Taoiseach succeeded in securing support of the Dáil. Varadkar, having failed to be re-elected Taoiseach, resigned, in line with the constitutional requirement where a Taoiseach fails to enjoy the support of a majority of the Dáil. He and the other members of the government continued to carry out their duties pending the appointment of their successors. It was reported that Fine Gael was prepared to go into opposition. On 11 March, Fianna Fáil and Fine Gael entered detailed talks to establish a coalition, potentially with the Green Party, and deal with the COVID-19 pandemic in Ireland. As of 17 March, those talks were still scheduled for later that week. However, the Green Party suggested that it would not join such a coalition, preferring a national unity government. On 4 April, it was reported that FF and FG were making progress on their talks, and that the Labour Party was preferred to the Green Party as the third coalition partner due to internal divisions in the Green Party. However, the Labour Party stated that it preferred to remain in opposition. Another option would be a grand coalition which could reach a majority with the support of independents, but such a coalition would be fragile. Some Fine Gael politicians predicted another election in September, which Fianna Fáil was eager to avoid.

On 14 April, Fianna Fáil and Fine Gael reached a coalition agreement, which includes a rotation for Taoiseach. However, they lacked a majority and needed to bring other parties or independents into the coalition to form a government. The Greens required an annual 7% cut to carbon emissions, among other demands, to participate as the third party of government; these demands did not include Green leader Eamon Ryan participating in the taoiseach rotation scheme, despite rumours to the contrary. The Social Democrats, Aontú, and technical groups of independents also expressed varying degrees of interest in entering into government formation negotiations with Fianna Fáil and Fine Gael.

A draft programme for government was agreed between Fianna Fáil, Fine Gael, and the Green Party on 15 June 2020. It was determined that the position of Taoiseach would rotate between Micheál Martin and Leo Varadkar. Martin would serve as Taoiseach for the first half of the term, with Varadkar as Tánaiste; the two would switch positions for the second half of the term. The programme needed the approval by each party's membership. Fianna Fáil and the Green Party require a simple majority and a 67% majority, respectively, in a postal ballot of all members, while Fine Gael uses an electoral college system, with its parliamentary party making up 50% of the electorate, constituency delegates 25%, councillors 15% and the party's executive council filling the final 10%.

On 26 June, Fine Gael voted 80%, Fianna Fáil voted 74% and the Green Party voted 76% in favour of the programme. Clare Bailey, the leader of the Green Party in Northern Ireland – a branch of the Irish Green Party – publicly rejected the idea of the Greens being part of the coalition deal with Fianna Fáil and Fine Gael. She said the coalition deal proposed the "most fiscally conservative arrangements in a generation". The coalition deal allowed for a government to be formed on 27 June, with Fianna Fáil leader Micheál Martin serving as Taoiseach until December 2022. Subsequently, the Dáil voted on 27 June to nominate Micheál Martin as Taoiseach. He was appointed afterward by President Michael D. Higgins and announced his cabinet later that day.

=== Polling ===
| Pollster/client(s) | Date(s) conducted | Sample size | Broad left coalition | Fianna Fáil–Fine Gael | Fianna Fáil–Sinn Féin | New election | Lead |
|---|---|---|---|---|---|---|---|
| Sunday Business Post/Red C | 12–14 Feb | 3,700 | 26% | 26% | 19% | 15% | Tie |

== Seanad election ==
The Dáil election was followed by the 2020 Seanad election to the 26th Seanad.

== Notes, citations and sources ==
=== References ===
Poll references

Poll footnotes

=== Further reading ===
- Ryan, Tim, ed. (2020). Nealon's Guide to the 33rd Dáil and 26th Seanad and the 2019 Local and European Elections. The Irish Times. ISBN 978-1-9997139-1-1.

=== External links ===
- 33rd Dáil General Election Results Houses of the Oireachtas
- L&RS Infographic: General Election 2020 – A Statistical Profile Houses of the Oireachtas
