= 2020 Ceann Comhairle election =

Parliamentary election in Ireland

- 20 February 2020
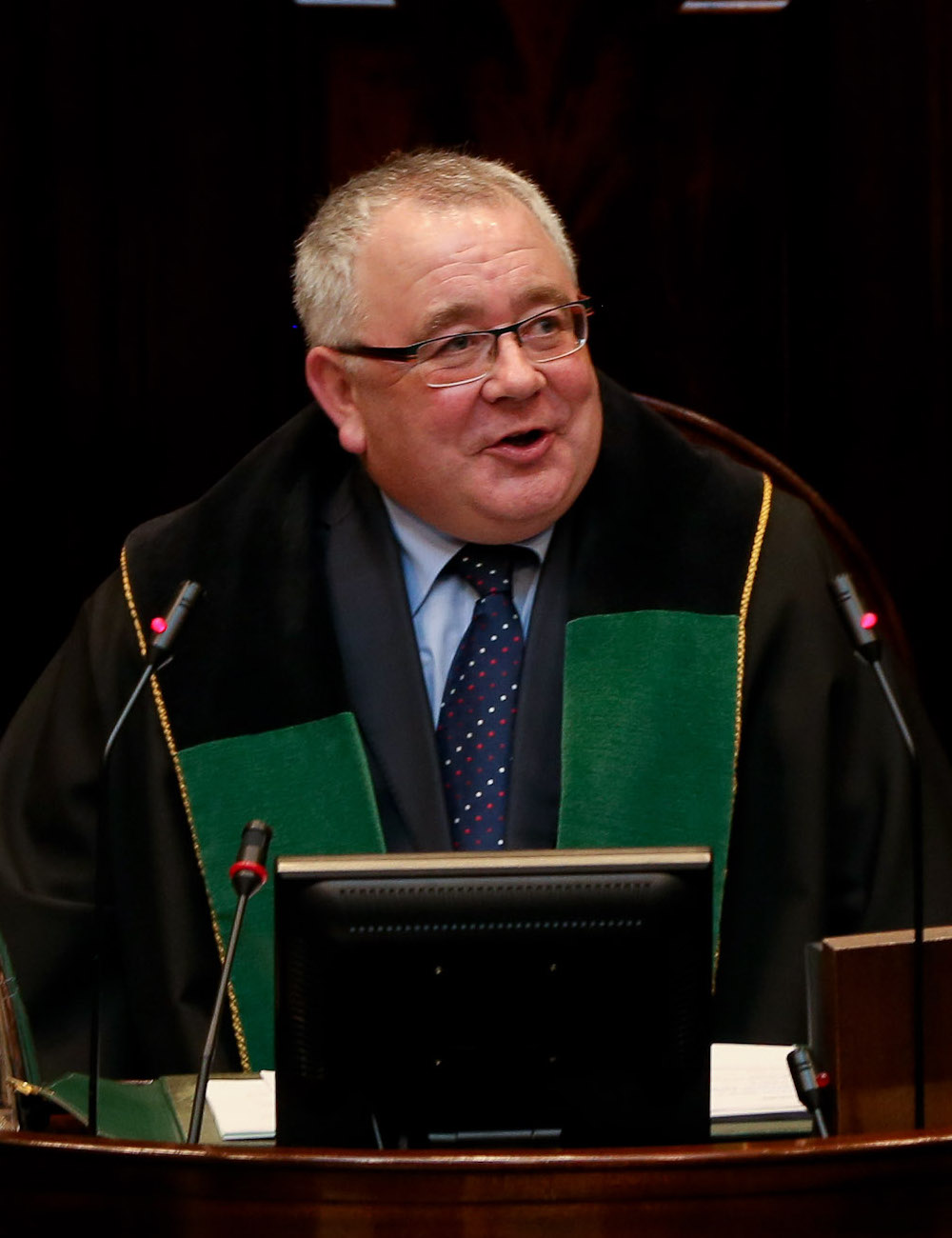

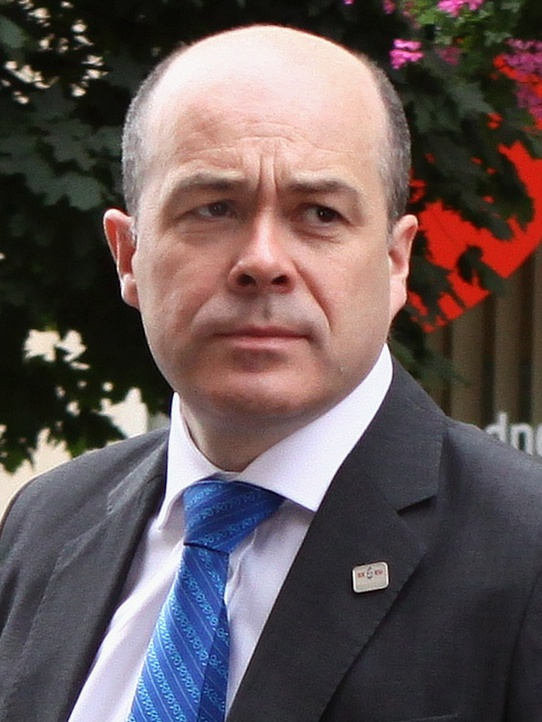
Nominee	Seán Ó Fearghaíl	Denis Naughten
Party	Fianna Fáil	Independent
1st preference	130	28
Ceann Comhairle before election
Seán Ó Fearghaíl
Fianna Fáil
Elected Ceann Comhairle
Seán Ó Fearghaíl
Fianna Fáil

The 2020 election of the Ceann Comhairle took place on 20 February 2020 at the commencement of the 33rd Dáil. It was the second election to be performed by secret ballot.

== Ceann Comhairle election ==
=== Rules ===
Under the rules for the election of the Ceann Comhairle, introduced during the 31st Dáil, candidates must be nominated by at least seven other members of Dáil Éireann. Each member may nominate only one candidate. Nominations must be submitted to the Clerk of the Dáil by not later than 6 p.m. on the day before the first day the Dáil meets after the general election in order to be valid, which for the 2020 general election was 19 February 2020. Nominations may be withdrawn at any time up to the close of nominations.

More than one candidate was nominated, so the Dáil voted by secret ballot in order of preference after the candidates' speeches, which may not exceed five minutes, with an absolute majority required for victory. If no candidate won a majority on first preferences, the individual with the fewest votes would be eliminated and their votes redistributed in accordance with their next highest preference, under the single transferable vote system. (Note: Single-winner STV is, in effect, equivalent to instant runoff voting.) Eliminations and redistributions would continue until one member received the requisite absolute majority. Then, the House voted on a formal motion to appoint the member in question to the position of Ceann Comhairle. The Clerk of the Dáil was the presiding officer of the House during the election process.

=== Candidates ===
The Ceann Comhairle of the 32nd Dáil, Seán Ó Fearghaíl, stood for re-election to the position. The only other candidate was independent TD Denis Naughten. Independent TD Michael McNamara wrote to members seeking their support for his nomination but did put his name forward. Sinn Féin decided not to nominate a candidate.

=== Result ===
2020 election: Ceann Comhairle
Party	Candidate	FPv%	Count
Party	Candidate	FPv%	1
Fianna Fáil	Seán Ó Fearghaíl	82.3	130
Independent	Denis Naughten	17.7	28
Electorate: 160 Valid: 158 Spoilt: 0 Quota: 80 Turnout: 98.75

== Leas-Cheann Comhairle election ==
2020 Leas-Cheann Comhairle election
- 24 July 2020
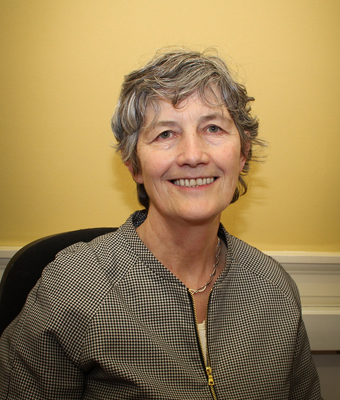

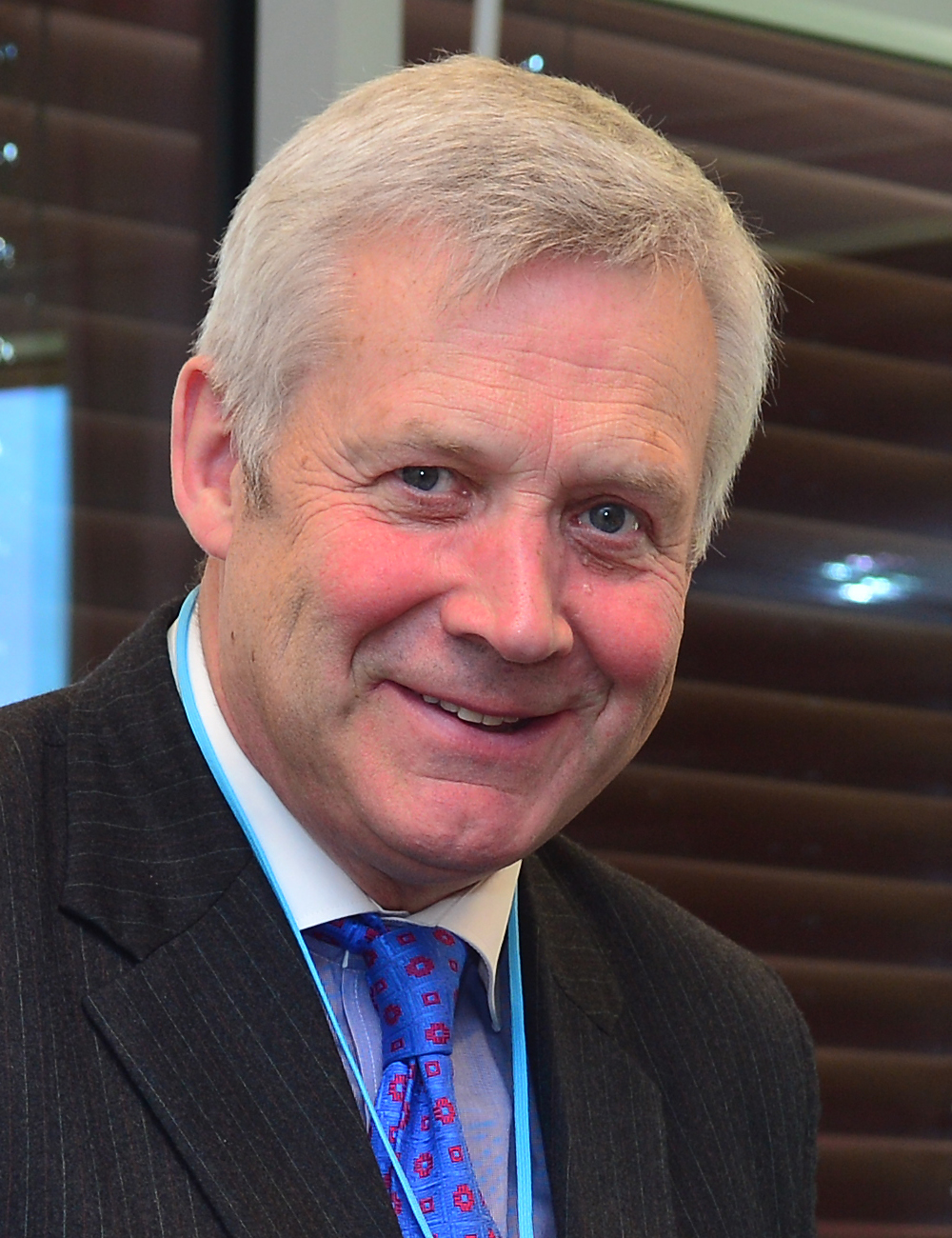
Nominee	Catherine Connolly	Fergus O'Dowd
Party	Independent	Fine Gael
1st preference	77	74
Leas-Cheann Comhairle before election
Pat Gallagher
Fianna Fáil
Elected Leas-Cheann Comhairle
Catherine Connolly
Independent

Elections for the Leas-Cheann Comhairle (deputy chairperson) were set for 26 March 2020 but deferred due to the COVID-19 pandemic.

The election eventually took place on the 23 July 2020. Fergus O'Dowd was seen as the front runner in this election, as he was the Government's nominee. However, some government TDs either voted in favour of Catherine Connolly or abstained.

Catherine Connolly was elected by 77 votes to 74.
