= Seán Ó Fearghaíl =

Irish politician (born 1960)

Seán Ó Fearghaíl TD
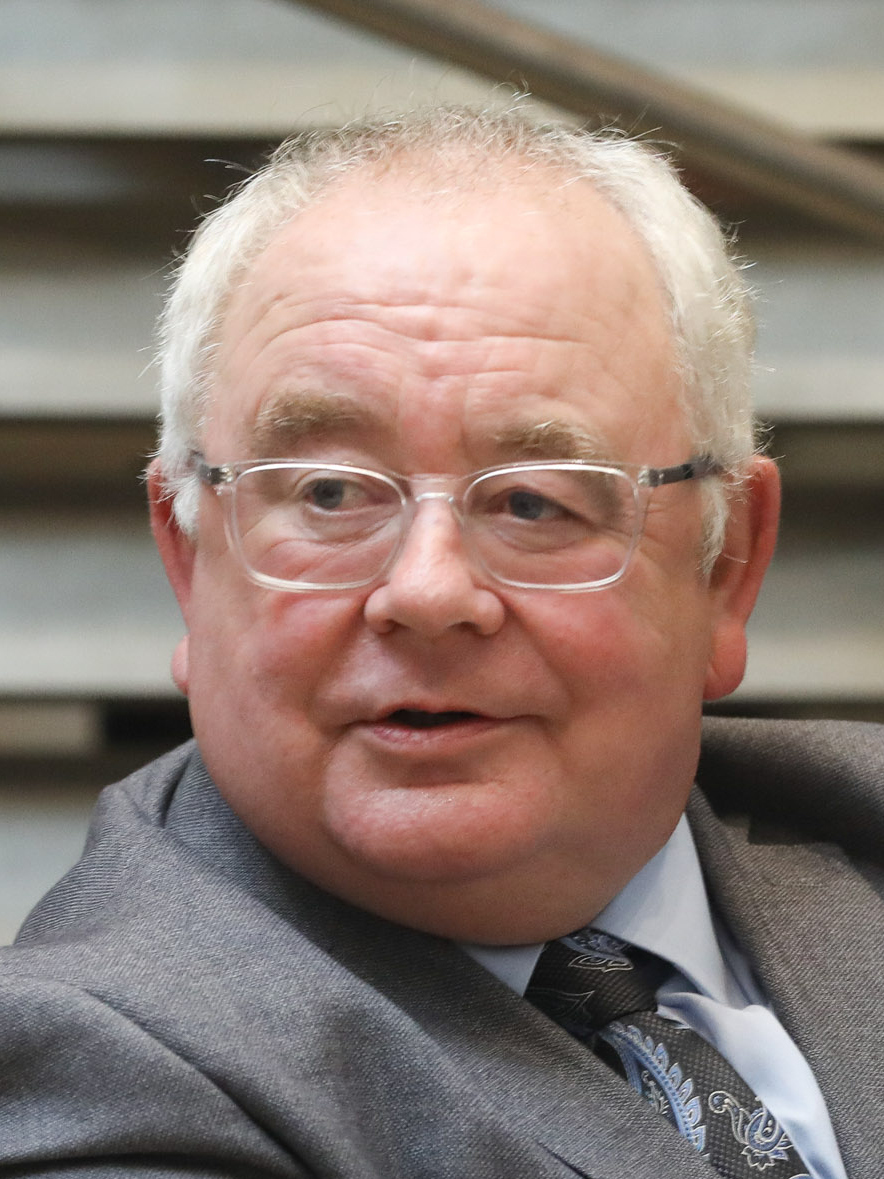
- Ó Fearghaíl in 2025

Ceann Comhairle of Dáil Éireann
- In office 10 March 2016 – 18 December 2024
- Deputy: Pat "the Cope" Gallagher; (2016–2020); Catherine Connolly (2020–2024)
- Preceded by: Seán Barrett
- Succeeded by: Verona Murphy

Teachta Dála
- Incumbent
- Assumed office May 2002
- Constituency: Kildare South

Senator
- In office 2 June 2000 – 17 May 2002
- Constituency: Agricultural Panel

Personal details
- Born: 17 April 1960 (age 66) Newbridge, County Kildare, Ireland
- Party: Fianna Fáil
- Spouse: Mary Clare Meaney (m. 1997)
- Children: 4
- Education: Dublin City University

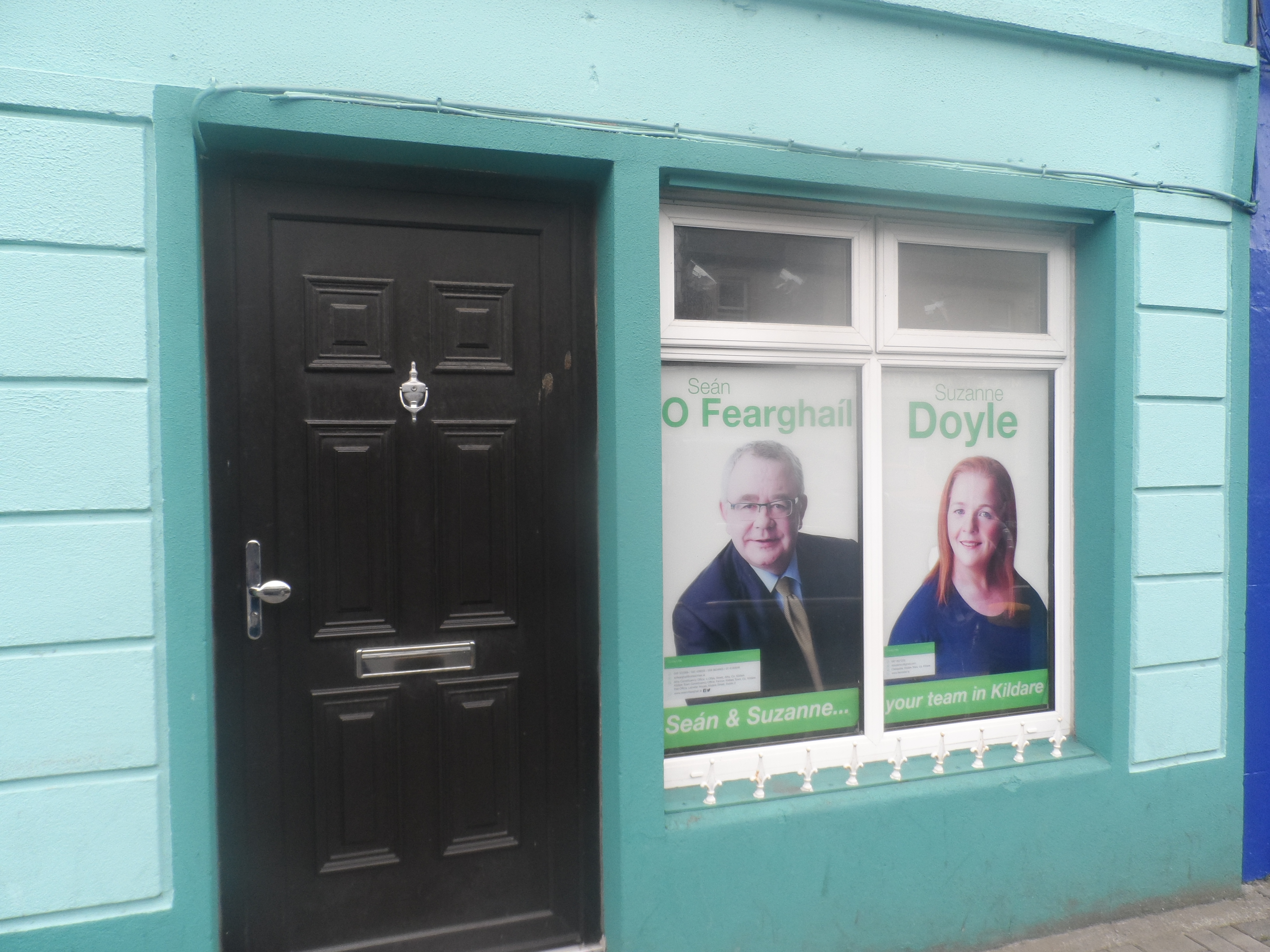
Ó Fearghaíl's constituency office, Kildare

Seán Ó Fearghaíl (pronounced [ˈʃaːn̪ˠ oː ˈfʲaɾˠiːlʲ]; born 17 April 1960) is an Irish Fianna Fáil politician who has been a Teachta Dála (TD) for the Kildare South constituency since 2002. He served as the Ceann Comhairle of Dáil Éireann from March 2016 to December 2024. He was a Senator for the Agricultural Panel from 2000 to 2002.

== Life and career ==
Ó Fearghaíl comes from a farming background, and previously worked for Dublin Corporation. He was elected as a member of Kildare County Council in 1985. He first stood for election to Dáil Éireann in the Kildare constituency at the 1987 general election, but was unsuccessful. He was unsuccessful again at the 1989 general election.

After further defeats at the 1992 and 1997 general elections, he stood for Seanad Éireann in 1997, as a candidate before the Agricultural Panel, but he was again unsuccessful in seeking election. He won a seat in the 21st Seanad following a by-election held in June 2000, after the death of Senator Patrick McGowan.

Ó Fearghaíl won a Dáil seat on his fifth attempt following the 2002 general election, when he defeated the sitting Fine Gael TD Alan Dukes. At the 2007 general election, he topped the poll and was elected on the first count. He was re-elected at the 2011 general election and at the 2016 general election.

He was the Fianna Fáil party whip and Spokesperson on Foreign Affairs and Trade from April 2011 to July 2012. In July 2012, he was appointed as Spokesperson on Constitutional Reform, Arts and Culture, and Defence, while retaining the post of party whip. Ó Fearghaíl sent Éamon Ó Cuív a letter gagging him during the European Fiscal Compact referendum campaign, after Ó Cuív expressed his own opinion of the Compact against the party's wishes.

He was elected as Ceann Comhairle of Dáil Éireann, by its members, at the first sitting of the 32nd Dáil on 10 March 2016. This was the first time the position was filled by secret ballot. He was re-elected to the position at the first sitting of the 33rd Dáil on 20 February 2020.

On 22 November 2021, Ó Fearghaíl began self-isolating and working from home after testing positive for COVID-19. Leas-Cheann Comhairle Catherine Connolly took over his duties.

In May 2024, Ó Fearghaíl convened the Task Force on Safe Participation in Political Life, chaired by former Garda Commissioner Nóirín O'Sullivan.

At the 2024 general election, Ó Fearghaíl exercised his right of automatic election as outgoing Ceann Comhairle. Before the election, he indicated that he would not seek re-election as Ceann Comhairle, and would return to the Fianna Fáil parliamentary party. After the election, it was reported that he was considering a third term. He stood at the 2024 Ceann Comhairle election but was not elected.

Following Fianna Fáil's disastrous presidential election campaign in 2025, senior TDs Seán Ó Fearghaíl, Willie O'Dea and Pat 'the Cope’ Gallagher issued a statement criticising the leadership's handling of the campaign and its aftermath, with reference to "the top-down autocratic style of politics" within the internal culture of the party.

== Support for the People's Republic of China ==
In his role as Ceann Comhairle, Ó Fearghaíl has been a vocal supporter of Chinese Government policy and increasing ties between Ireland and China. In 2018, he warned Teachtaí Dála and Senators that contact with Taiwan would "offend the Chinese government", and could damage Ireland's business and diplomatic relationship with China. Accusations of lobbying the Irish Government and political parties on behalf of the Chinese government were leveled by members of the Oireachtas in November 2020. Ó Fearghaíl has also praised China's human rights record and economic policies.

Political offices
Preceded by Seán Barrett	Ceann Comhairle of Dáil Éireann; 2016–2024	Succeeded by Verona Murphy

Dáil	Election	Deputy (Party)	Deputy (Party)	Deputy (Party)	Deputy (Party)
28th	1997	Jack Wall (Lab)	Alan Dukes (FG)	Seán Power (FF)	3 seats 1997–2020
29th	2002	Jack Wall (Lab)	Seán Ó Fearghaíl (FF)	Seán Power (FF)	3 seats 1997–2020
30th	2007	Jack Wall (Lab)	Seán Ó Fearghaíl (FF)	Seán Power (FF)	3 seats 1997–2020
31st	2011	Jack Wall (Lab)	Seán Ó Fearghaíl (FF)	Martin Heydon (FG)	3 seats 1997–2020
32nd	2016	Fiona O'Loughlin (FF)	Seán Ó Fearghaíl (FF)	Martin Heydon (FG)	3 seats 1997–2020
33rd	2020	Cathal Berry (Ind.)	Seán Ó Fearghaíl (FF)	Martin Heydon (FG)	Patricia Ryan (SF)
34th	2024	Mark Wall (Lab)	Seán Ó Fearghaíl (FF)	Martin Heydon (FG)	Shónagh Ní Raghallaigh (SF)
