= Opinion polling for the 2020 Irish general election =

Numerous polls of support for political parties in Ireland were taken between the 2016 general election and the 2020 general election, which was held on Saturday 8 February 2020. Opinion polls on voting intentions are conducted regularly.

The most frequent were commissioned by media organisations and were published on an approximately monthly basis by The Sunday Times (which uses Behaviour and Attitudes on an exclusive basis) and The Sunday Business Post (which uses the Red C polling company).

Less frequently polls were published by The Irish Times, the Sunday Independent, RTÉ, and others.

Opinion polling for Irish general elections
Previous	Next
← 2016 election	2024 election →
← 2016 polling	2024 polling →

== Graphical summary ==
Graph of opinion polls conducted. Trend lines represent local regressions.

=== Key polls ===
As methodologies and results differ, even where polls are taken over the same dates, the results of the two main polling companies are shown separately:

==== Sunday Business Post / Red C poll ====
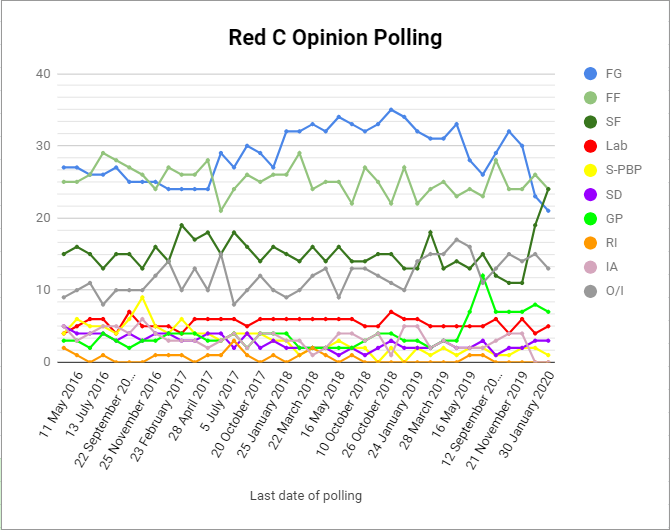

==== The Sunday Times / B&A poll ====
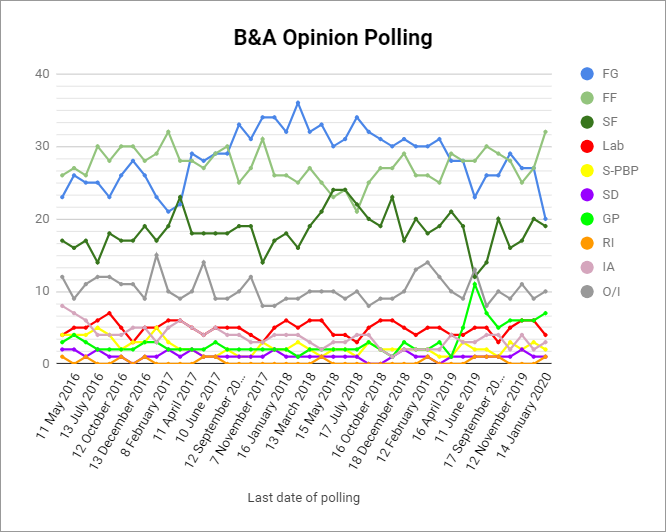

== National opinion polls ==
All opinion polls shown below were commissioned by print or broadcast media outlets, with the exception of the Survation poll conducted up to 2 February 2020, which was commissioned by Sinn Féin.

Color key:

Exit poll Private poll

Last date of polling	Polling firm / Commissioner	Sample size	FG	FF	SF	Lab	S–PBP	SD	GP	RI	IA	O/I (Note: This column includes figures for Independents 4 Change and Aontú when available.)
8 February 2020	General election		20.9	22.2	24.5	4.4	2.6	2.9	7.1	0.3	-	12.2 (Note: Aontú is on 1.9%.) (Note: The figure for 'Others/Independents' is the remainder when all others are removed. As with all such calculations, the figure shown may be slightly inaccurate due to rounding effects.)
8 February 2020	Ipsos MRBI/RTÉ/Irish Times/TG4/UCD	5,300	22.4	22.2	22.3	4.6	2.8	3.4	7.9	(Note: Renua is not mentioned.)	(Note: IA are not mentioned.)	14.5
2 February 2020	Survation/Sinn Féin	1,074	17	22	25	6	5	3	9		1	12
1 February 2020	Ipsos MRBI/Irish Times	1,200	20	23	25	4	2	2	8		< 1	16 (Note: Aontú is on 1%.)
30 January 2020	Red C/Business Post	1,000	21	24	24	5	1	3	7			13 (Note: Aontú is on 2%.)
30 January 2020	Panelbase/The Times (Ireland)	1,000	19	23	21	5	5	5	10	?	?	12
25 January 2020	Ireland Thinks/Irish Mail on Sunday	1,031	22	27	20	6	1	3	10			11
23 January 2020	Red C/Business Post	1,000	23	26	19	4	2	3	8			15
18 January 2020	Ipsos MRBI/Irish Times	1,200	23	25	21	5	2	2	8		1	13
14 January 2020	Behaviour and Attitudes/The Sunday Times	923	20	32	19	4	2	1	7	1	3	10
24 December 2019	Ireland Thinks/Irish Daily Mail	1,585	28	25	15	5	3	3	7		(Note: The poll makes no distinction between different groupings of Independents, the Independent Alliance is included in the figure for Others.)	16
17 December 2019	Behaviour and Attitudes/The Sunday Times	936	27	27	20	6	3	1	6		2	9 (Note: Aontú is on 0%.) (Note: The 9% figure for 'Others/Independents' is the remainder when all others are removed. As with all such calculations, the figure shown may be slightly inaccurate due to rounding effects.)
21 November 2019	Red C/The Sunday Business Post	1,000	30	24	11	6	2	2	7		4	14 (Note: Aontú has 1%.)
12 November 2019	Behaviour and Attitudes/The Sunday Times	923	27	25	17	6	2	2	6	0	4	11 (Note: The 9% figure for 'Others/Independents' is the remainder when all others are removed. As with all such calculations, the figure shown may be slightly inaccurate due to rounding effects.)
24 October 2019	Red C/The Sunday Business Post	1,000	32	24	11	4	1	2	7		4	15
15 October 2019	Behaviour and Attitudes/The Sunday Times	?	29	28	16	5	3	1	6	0	2	9 (Note: The 9% figure for 'Others/Independents' is the remainder when all others are removed. As with all such calculations, the figure shown may be slightly inaccurate due to rounding effects.)
13 October 2019	Ipsos MRBI/Irish Times	1,200	29	25	14	6	1	1	8		<1	14
17 September 2019	Behaviour and Attitudes/The Sunday Times	929	26	29	20	3	1	1	5	1	4	10 (Note: The 10% figure for 'Others/Independents' is the remainder when all others are removed. As with all such calculations, the figure shown may be slightly inaccurate due to rounding effects.)
12 September 2019	Red C/The Sunday Business Post	1,000	29	28	12	6	1	1	7	0	3	13 (Note: The 13% figure for 'Others/Independents' is the remainder when all others are removed. As with all such calculations, the figure shown may be slightly inaccurate due to rounding effects.)
16 July 2019	Behaviour and Attitudes/The Sunday Times	902	26	30	14	5	2	1	7	1	4	8
11 June 2019	Behaviour and Attitudes/The Sunday Times	900	23	28	12	5	2	1	11	1	3	13
24 May 2019	Red C/RTÉ/TG4	2,671	26	23	15	5	2	3	12	1	2	11
16 May 2019	Red C/The Sunday Business Post	2,000	28	24	13	5	2	2	7	1	2	16 (Note: Aontú is on 2%.) (Note: The 16% figure for 'Others/Independents' is got by adding the cited 2% for Aontú to the 14% cited for 'other Independent candidates'. As with all such calculations, the figure shown may be slightly inaccurate due to rounding effects.)
14 May 2019	Behaviour and Attitudes/The Sunday Times	933	28	28	19	4	3	1	5		3	9
8 May 2019	Ipsos MRBI/Irish Times	1,500	29	26	16	7	(Note: The 18% figure shown for Independents/Others is calculated by subtracting the cited source's 4% for the Greens from that source's 22% for Independents and all other parties except Fine Gael, Fianna Fáil, Sinn Féin, and Labour, so the 18% figure shown may be slightly inaccurate due to rounding effects. The cited source does not give figures for other parties or alliances, but states that it includes the Green Party, Social Democrats and Solidarity-PBP.)		4			18
17 April 2019	Red C/The Sunday Business Post	1,000	33	23	14	5	1	2	3		2	17 (Note: A figure for 'Others/Independents' is not mentioned in the cited source, but has been calculated by subtracting the other parties from 100%, so the figure shown may be slightly inaccurate due to rounding effects.)
16 April 2019	Behaviour and Attitudes/The Sunday Times	933	28	29	21	4	1	1	1		4	10
28 March 2019	Red C/The Sunday Business Post	1,000	31	25	13	5	2	3	3	0 (Note: Renua has less than 1%.)	3	15 (Note: Aontú has less than 1%.)
12 March 2019	Behaviour and Attitudes/The Sunday Times	930	31	25	19	5	1	0	3	0	2	12
5 March 2019	Ipsos MRBI/Irish Times	1,200	30	24	21	6	2	1	2		1	13
20 February 2019	Red C/The Sunday Business Post	1,000	31	24	18	5	1	2	2	0	2	15
12 February 2019	Behaviour and Attitudes/The Sunday Times	910	30	26	18	5	2	1	2	1	2	14
24 January 2019	Red C/The Sunday Business Post	1,000	32	22	13	6	2	2	3	0	5	14
15 January 2019	Behaviour and Attitudes/The Sunday Times	907	30	26	20	4	2	1	2		2	13
21 December 2018	Ireland Thinks/Irish Daily Mail	1,546	32	23	16	7	4	3	4			13
18 December 2018	Behaviour and Attitudes/The Sunday Times	911	31	29	17	5	2	2	3		2	10
13 December 2018	Millward Brown/The Sunday Independent	920	32	27	21	5	1	2	1		4	6
22 November 2018	Red C/The Sunday Business Post	1,000	34	27	13	6	0	2	3	0	5	10
13 November 2018	Behaviour and Attitudes/The Sunday Times	905	30	27	23	6	2	1	1		1	9
26 October 2018	Red C/RTÉ News	3,474	35	22	15	7	2	3	4	0	1	11 (Note: This figure includes 2% for Independents 4 Change.)
17 October 2018	Red C/The Sunday Business Post	1,000	33	25	15	5	0	2	4		4	12
16 October 2018	Behaviour and Attitudes/The Sunday Times	940	31	27	19	6	2	0	2	0	2	9
12 October 2018	Ipsos MRBI/Irish Times	1,200	33	25	24	4	3	1	2		1	6
10 October 2018	Red C/Paddy Power	1,000	32	27	14	5	2	1	3	0	3	13
18 September 2018	Behaviour and Attitudes/The Sunday Times	940	32	25	20	5	3	0	3	0	4	8
13 September 2018	Red C/The Sunday Business Post	1,000	33	22	14	6	2	2	2	1	4	13
24 August 2018	Ireland Thinks/Irish Daily Mail	942	29	24	19	6	1	2	2			17
17 July 2018	Behaviour and Attitudes/The Sunday Times	931	34	21	22	3	1	1	2	0	4	10
12 June 2018	Behaviour and Attitudes/The Sunday Times	931	31	24	24	4	2	1	2	0	3	9
16 May 2018	Red C/The Sunday Business Post	1,000	34	25	16	6	3	1	2	0	4	9
15 May 2018	Behaviour and Attitudes/The Sunday Times	935	30	23	24	4	2	1	2		3	10
30 April 2018	Millward Brown/The Sunday Independent	1,003	34	27	22	5	1	(Note: Social Democrats are not mentioned.)	3		5	2
26 April 2018	Red C/The Sunday Business Post	1,000	32	25	14	6	2	2	2	1	2	13
18 April 2018	Ireland Thinks/Irish Daily Mail	?	29	26	16	5	4	3	4			13
17 April 2018	Behaviour and Attitudes/The Sunday Times	928	33	25	21	6	1	1	2	1	2	10
17 April 2018	Ipsos MRBI/Irish Times	1,200	31	26	22	5	2	1	3		1	9
22 March 2018	Red C/The Sunday Business Post	1,000	33	24	16	6	2	2	2	2	1	12
13 March 2018	Behaviour and Attitudes/The Sunday Times	900	32	27	19	6	2	1	2		3	10
22 February 2018	Red C/The Sunday Business Post	1,000	32	29	14	6	1	2	2	1	3	10
14 February 2018	Millward Brown/The Sunday Independent	970	36	28	20	4	1	1	2		3	11
13 February 2018	Behaviour and Attitudes/The Sunday Times	926	36	25	16	5	3	1	1		4	9
25 January 2018	Red C/The Sunday Business Post	1,003	32	26	15	6	3	2	4	0	3	9
23 January 2018	Ipsos MRBI/Irish Times	1,200	34	25	19	4	2	1	3		1	11
16 January 2018	Behaviour and Attitudes/The Sunday Times	920	32	26	18	6	2	1	2		4	9
24 December 2017	Behaviour and Attitudes/The Sunday Times	913	34	26	17	5	2	2	2		4	8
22 December 2017	Ireland Thinks/Irish Daily Mail	1,144	33	26	16	6	3	2	2			12
7 December 2017	Ipsos MRBI/Irish Times	1,200	36	25	19	4	1	1	3		1	10
23 November 2017	Red C/The Sunday Business Post	1,004	27	26	16	6	3	3	4	1	4	10
7 November 2017	Behaviour and Attitudes/The Sunday Times	919	34	31	14	3	3	1	2	0	3	8
20 October 2017	Red C/The Sunday Business Post	1,004	29	25	14	6	4	2	4	0	4	12
10 October 2017	Behaviour and Attitudes/The Sunday Times	915	31	27	19	4	1	1	2	0	3	12
2 October 2017	Ipsos MRBI/Irish Times	1,200	31	29	19	4	2	2	3	0	1	9
22 September 2017	Red C/The Sunday Business Post	1,004	30	26	16	5	4	4	2	1	2	10
12 September 2017	Behaviour and Attitudes/The Sunday Times	937	33	25	19	5	1	1	2	0	4	10
21 July 2017	Millward Brown/The Sunday Independent	956	30	29	20	7	1	0	2		5	7
11 July 2017	Behaviour and Attitudes/The Sunday Times	923	29	30	18	5	2	1	2	0	4	9
5 July 2017	Red C/The Sunday Business Post	1,000	27	24	18	6	4	2	4	3	4	8
10 June 2017	Behaviour and Attitudes/The Sunday Times	1,004	29	29	18	5	1	1	3	1	5	9
25 May 2017	Red C/The Sunday Business Post	1,004	29	21	15	6	3	4	3	1	3	15
13 May 2017	Behaviour and Attitudes/The Sunday Times	945	28	27	18	4	1	1	2	1	4	14
28 April 2017	Red C/The Sunday Business Post	1,004	24	28	18	6	4	4	3	1	2	10
11 April 2017	Behaviour and Attitudes/The Sunday Times	937	29	28	18	5	2	2	2			11
24 March 2017	Red C/The Sunday Business Post	1,004	24	26	17	6	4	3	4	0	3	13
8 March 2017	Behaviour & Attitudes/The Sunday Times	934	22	28	23	6	2	1	2	0	6	9
28 February 2017	Ipsos MRBI/Irish Times	1,200	28	29	21	4	3	1	3	(Note: Renua is featured in Others.)	2	9
23 February 2017	Red C/The Sunday Business Post	1,004	24	26	19	4	6	3	4	1	3	10
16 February 2017	Millward Brown/The Sunday Independent	960	25	33	20	6	3	2	2		5	4
8 February 2017	Behaviour & Attitudes/The Sunday Times	955	21	32	19	6	3	2	2	0	5	10
26 January 2017	Red C/The Sunday Business Post	1,004	24	27	14	5	4	4	4	1	3	14
21 January 2017	Behaviour & Attitudes/The Sunday Times	921	23	29	17	5	5	1	3	0	3	15
13 December 2016	Behaviour & Attitudes/The Sunday Times	924	26	28	19	5	3	1	3	1	5	9
6 December 2016	Ipsos MRBI/Irish Times	1,200	27	30	17	6	3	2	3		2	10
25 November 2016	Red C/The Sunday Business Post	1,000	25	24	16	5	5	4	3	1	4	12
9 November 2016	Behaviour & Attitudes/The Sunday Times	924	28	30	17	3	3	0	2	0	5	11
27 October 2016	Red C/The Sunday Business Post	1,002	25	26	13	5	9	3	3	0	6	10
20 October 2016	Millward Brown/The Sunday Independent	942	29	27	20	8	5	1	2		5	3
12 October 2016	Behaviour & Attitudes/The Sunday Times	917	26	30	17	5	2	1	2	1	4	11
4 October 2016	Ipsos MRBI/Irish Times	1,200	26	26	19	5	3	2	3			15
22 September 2016	Red C/The Sunday Business Post	1,002	25	27	15	7	6	4	2	0	4	10
14 September 2016	Behaviour & Attitudes/The Sunday Times	911	23	28	18	7	4	1	2	0	4	12
27 July 2016	Red C/Paddy Power	1,000	27	28	15	4	4	3	3	0	5	10
13 July 2016	Red C/The Sunday Business Post	1,004	26	29	13	6	5	4	4	1	5	8
13 July 2016	Behaviour & Attitudes/The Sunday Times	909	25	30	14	6	5	2	2	0	4	12
7 July 2016	Ipsos MRBI/Irish Times	1,200	24	33	16	5	2	2	4		2	11
29 June 2016	Millward Brown/The Sunday Independent	1,000	30	26	20	7	4	2	3			8
15 June 2016	Behaviour & Attitudes/The Sunday Times	913	25	26	17	5	4	1	3	1	6	11
26 May 2016	Red C/The Sunday Business Post	1,004	26	26	15	6	5	4	2	0	4	11
11 May 2016	Behaviour & Attitudes/The Sunday Times	898	26	27	16	5	4	2	4	0	7	9
11 May 2016	Red C/Paddy Power	1,015	27	25	16	5	6	4	3	1	3	10
13 April 2016	Behaviour & Attitudes/The Sunday Times	926	23	26	17	4	4	2	3	1	8	12
10 March 2016	Red C/The Sunday Business Post	1,006	27	25	15	4	4	5	3	2	5	9
26 February 2016	General election		25.5	24.3	13.8	6.6	3.9	3.0	2.7	2.2	4.2	13.7 (Note: This figure includes 1.5% for Independents 4 Change.)

=== Preferred Taoiseach ===
Date(s) conducted	Polling organisation	Sample size	Leo Varadkar	Micheál Martin	Lead
31 January 2020	Amárach Research	1,000	47%	53%	6%
24 January 2020	Amárach Research	1,000	43%	57%	14%
17 January 2020	Amárach Research	1,000	45%	55%	10%

== Constituency opinion polls ==
=== Donegal ===
Last date of polling	Polling firm / Commissioner	Sample size	FF	SF	FG	GP	Aon	Pringle	O'Donnell	Casey	McConnell	Lead
8 February 2020	General election		20.4	45.1	13.8	2.1	3.1	7.1	6.1	1.5	0.8	24.7
23 January 2020	TG4/Ipsos MRBI	550	22	39	20	4	3	6	4	2	1	17
26 February 2016	General election		31.0	27.5	15.4	0.6		8.5				3.5

=== Galway West ===
Last date of polling	Polling firm / Commissioner	Sample size	FF	FG	SF	SD	Lab	GP	S-PBP	Aon	Connolly	Grealish	Cubbard	Lead
8 February 2020	General election		22.7	18.1	14.0	6.0	2.6	6.0	1.5	1.8	9.0	13.3	4.4	4.6
26 January 2020	TG4/Ipsos MRBI	525	20	23	7	12	5	10	2	1	9	7	3	3
28 February 2016	General election		24.2	24.0	8.9	5.0	5.0	2.5	2.0	-	7.6	11.2	3.0	0.2

=== Kerry ===
Last date of polling	Polling firm / Commissioner	Sample size	M Healy-Rae	FF	SF	FG	GP	Aon	D Healy-Rae	Cronin	O'Leary	Lead
8 February 2020	General election		21.7	20.7	20.3	18.4	5.3	1.4	11.2	0.5	0	1.0
2 February 2020	TG4/Ipsos MRBI	538	19.6	23.0	20.0	23.0	9.0	2.0	3.9	1	0	Tie
26 February 2016	General election		25.7	15.8	11.9	21.4	1.3	-	12.6			3.0
