= Opinion polling for the 2011 Irish general election =

This table lists opinion polls and results of elections between the Irish general elections of 2007 and 2011.

Opinion polling for Irish general elections
Previous	Next
← 2007 election	2016 election →
← 2007 polling	2016 polling →

== Graphical summary ==
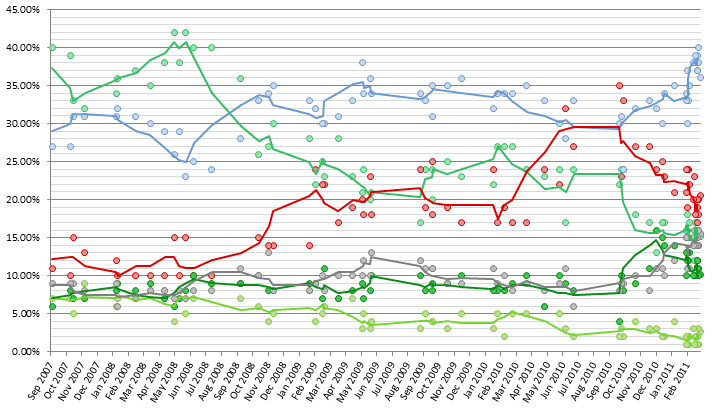
4-point average trend line of poll results from 23 September 2007 to 26 February 2011, with each line corresponding to a political party. Fianna Fáil Fine Gael Labour Party Green Party Sinn Féin Others

The chart shows the relative state of the parties from September 2007 to the February 2011 election.

== Polls ==
Date	Source	Polling Agency	Fianna Fáil	Fine Gael	Labour Party	Green Party	Sinn Féin	Ind./Others
25 February 2011	General election	N/A	17.4%	36.1%	19.4%	1.8%	9.9%	15.4%
26 February 2011	RTÉ exit poll	Millward Brown Lansdowne	15.1%	36.1%	20.5%	2.7%	10.1%	15.5%
23 February 2011	Paddy Power	RED C	16%	40%	18%	3%	10%	14%
23 February 2011	Irish Independent	Millward Brown Lansdowne	14%	38%	20%	1%	11%	16%
21 February 2011	The Irish Times	Ipsos MRBI	16%	37%	19%	2%	11%	15%
20 February 2011	The Sunday Business Post	RED C	16%	39%	17%	2%	12%	14%
20 February 2011	Sunday Independent	Millward Brown Lansdowne	16%	37%	20%	1%	12%	14%
17 February 2011	Irish Daily Star	OI Research	17%	39%	18%	2%	10%	14%
16 February 2011	Irish Independent	Millward Brown Lansdowne	12%	38%	23%	1%	10%	16%
13 February 2011	The Sunday Business Post	RED C	15%	38%	20%	3%	10%	14%
6 February 2011	The Sunday Business Post.	RED C	17%	35%	22%	2%	13%	11%
3 February 2011	The Irish Times	Ipsos MRBI	15%	33%	24%	1%	12%	15%
2 February 2011	Paddy Power	RED C	18%	37%	19%	2%	12%	11%
2 February 2011	Irish Independent	Millward Brown Lansdowne	16%	30%	24%	1%	13%	15%
30 January 2011	The Sunday Business Post	RED C	16%	33%	21%	2%	13%	15%
30 January 2011	Sunday Independent	Millward Brown Lansdowne	16%	34%	24%	1%	10%	15%
7 January 2011	Paddy Power	RED C	14%	35%	21%	4%	14%	12%
19 December 2010	The Sunday Business Post	RED C	17%	34%	23%	2%	14%	10%
16 December 2010	The Irish Times	Ipsos MRBI	17%	30%	25%	2%	15%	11%
3 December 2010	The Irish Sun	RED C	13%	32%	24%	3%	16%	11%
21 November 2010	The Sunday Business Post	RED C	17%	31%	27%	3%	11%	8%
24 October 2010	The Sunday Business Post	RED C	18%	32%	27%	4%	9%	10%
30 September 2010	The Irish Times	Ipsos MRBI	24%	24%	33%	2%	8%	9%
26 September 2010	The Sunday Business Post	RED C	24%	31%	23%	3%	10%	9%
23 September 2010	TV3 News	Millward Brown Lansdowne	22%	30%	35%	2%	4%	8%
27 June 2010	The Sunday Business Post	RED C	24%	33%	27%	2%	8%	6%
11 June 2010	The Irish Times	Ipsos MRBI	17%	28%	32%	3%	9%	11%
30 May 2010	The Sunday Business Post	RED C	24%	30%	22%	5%	10%	9%
2 May 2010	The Sunday Business Post	RED C	23%	33%	24%	6%	6%	8%
28 March 2010	The Sunday Business Post	RED C	24%	35%	17%	5%	10%	9%
28 February 2010	The Sunday Business Post	RED C	27%	34%	17%	5%	9%	8%
13 February 2010	Irish Independent	Millward Brown IMS	27%	34%	19%	2%	8%	10%
31 January 2010	The Sunday Business Post	RED C	27%	34%	17%	5%	8%	9%
22 January 2010	The Irish Times	Ipsos MRBI	22%	32%	24%	3%	8%	11%
22 November 2009	The Sunday Business Post	RED C	23%	36%	17%	5%	10%	9%
25 October 2009	The Sunday Business Post	RED C	25%	35%	19%	3%	9%	9%
27 September 2009	The Sunday Business Post	RED C	24%	35%	18%	4%	8%	11%
26 September 2009	The Irish Times	TNS-MRBI	20%	31%	25%	4%	9%	11%
13 September 2009	The Sunday Business Post	RED C	24%	33%	19%	5%	8%	11%
3 September 2009	The Irish Times	TNS-MRBI	17%	34%	24%	3%	10%	12%
5 June 2009	European election	N/A	24.1%	29.1%	13.9%	1.9%	11.2%	19.7%
5 June 2009	Local elections	N/A	25.4%	32.2%	14.7%	2.3%	7.4%	18.0%
31 May 2009	The Sunday Business Post	RED C	21%	34%	18%	4%	10%	13%
29 May 2009	The Irish Times	TNS-MRBI	20%	36%	23%	3%	8%	10%
17 May 2009	The Sunday Business Post	RED C	24%	34%	18%	5%	7%	12%
15 May 2009	The Irish Times	TNS-MRBI	21%	38%	20%	3%	9%	10%
26 April 2009	The Sunday Business Post	RED C	23%	33%	19%	7%	8%	10%
29 March 2009	The Sunday Business Post	RED C	28%	31%	17%	7%	7%	10%
1 March 2009	The Sunday Business Post	RED C	23%	30%	22%	6%	11%	8%
27 February 2009	Irish Independent	Millward Brown IMS	25%	30%	22%	5%	7%	10%
13 February 2009	The Irish Times	TNS-MRBI	22%	32%	24%	4%	9%	9%
1 February 2009	The Sunday Business Post	RED C	28%	33%	14%	8%	9%	8%
23 November 2008	The Sunday Business Post	RED C	30%	35%	14%	5%	8%	8%
14 November 2008	The Irish Times	TNS-MRBI	27%	34%	14%	4%	8%	13%
26 October 2008	The Sunday Business Post	RED C	26%	33%	15%	6%	10%	10% (PDs 2%)
21 September 2008	The Sunday Business Post	RED C	36%	28%	9%	7%	9%	11% (PDs 3%)
27 July 2008	The Sunday Business Post	RED C	40%	24%	10%	9%	9%	8% (PDs 1%)
22 June 2008	The Sunday Business Post	RED C	40%	25%	10%	7%	10%	8% (PDs 2%)
7 June 2008	The Irish Times	TNS-MRBI	42%	23%	15%	5%	8%	7% (PDs 1%)
25 May 2008	The Sunday Business Post	RED C	38%	29%	10%	8%	7%	8% (PDs 2%)
16 May 2008	The Irish Times	TNS-MRBI	42%	26%	15%	4%	6%	7% (PDs 1%)
27 April 2008	The Sunday Business Post	RED C	38%	29%	10%	8%	7%	8% (PDs 2%)
30 March 2008	The Sunday Business Post	RED C	35%	30%	10%	8%	9%	8% (PDs 1%)
2 March 2008	The Sunday Business Post	RED C	37%	31%	10%	7%	8%	7% (PDs 2%)
27 January 2008	The Sunday Business Post	RED C	36%	32%	10%	7%	9%	6% (PDs 2%)
25 January 2008	The Irish Times	TNS-MRBI	34%	31%	12%	6%	8%	9% (PDs 3%)
25 November 2007	The Sunday Business Post	RED C	32%	31%	13%	9%	7%	9% (PDs 2%)
2 November 2007	The Irish Times	TNS-MRBI	33%	31%	15%	5%	7%	9% (PDs 2%)
28 October 2007	The Sunday Business Post	RED C	39%	27%	10%	7%	8%	9% (PDs 2%)
23 September 2007	The Sunday Business Post	RED C	40%	27%	11%	7%	6%	9% (PDs 3%)
24 May 2007	General election	N/A	41.5%	27.3%	10.1%	4.7%	6.9%	9.4% (PDs 2.7%)
