= Opinion polling for the 2016 Irish general election =

Numerous polls of support for political parties in Ireland were taken between the 2011 general election and the 2016 general election, held on Friday, 26 February 2016. The article also contains polls taken after the election while a government was being formed.

Two main tables of opinion polls are shown below. The top table lists opinion polls taken in 2016, the election year, and includes all political parties with Dáil representation, plus the Green Party. The second table, for polls from the last general election in 2011 up to 2015, does not break out Renua or the Social Democrats, which were both founded in 2015.

Opinion polling for Irish general elections
Previous	Next
← 2011 election	2020 election →
← 2011 polling	2020 polling →

== 2016 ==
Color key:

Exit poll

Date	Source/Link	Polling Agency	FG	Lab	FF	SF	AAA -PBP	RI	SD	GP	Others
26 February 2016	General election	—	25.5	6.6	24.3	13.8	3.9	2.2	3.0	2.7	17.9
26 February 2016	RTÉ	Behaviour & Attitudes	24.8	7.1	21.1	16.0	4.7	2.4	3.7	3.6	16.6
26 February 2016	The Irish Times	Ipsos MRBI	26.1	7.8	22.9	14.9	3.6	2.3	2.8	3.5	16.1
23 February 2016	Paddy Power	Red C	30	7	20	15	3	2	4	3	16 (Note: "Others" includes Independent Alliance 2%)
22 February 2016	The Irish Times	Ipsos MRBI	28	6	23	15	3	2	3	2	18 (Note: "Others" includes Independent Alliance 4% .Others also includes 3% who indicated they would vote Independent/Other but were undecided as to precisely whom.)
21 February 2016	Sunday Independent	Millward Brown	27	6	23	19	5	2	4	2	14 (Note: Millward Brown does not break out Independent Alliance)
21 February 2016	The Sunday Business Post	Red C	30	8	18	16	3	2	4	4	15 (Note: "Others" includes Independent Alliance 3%)
21 February 2016	The Sunday Times	Behaviour & Attitudes	30	4	22	15	5	3	3	3	15 (Note: "Others" includes Independent Alliance 5%, Workers' Party 1%)
16 February 2016	The Irish Sun	Red C	26	9	19	17	2	2	3	4	18 (Note: "Others" includes Independent Alliance 5%)
13 February 2016	The Sunday Business Post	Red C	28	8	18	20	3	1	4	2	16 (Note: "Others" includes Independent Alliance 3%)
10 February 2016	Paddy Power	Red C	30	8	18	17	4	2	3	2	16 (Note: "Others" includes Independent Alliance 4%)
6 February 2016	The Sunday Times	Behaviour & Attitudes	28	8	20	17	3	2	4	3	15 (Note: "Others" includes Independent Alliance 4%, Workers' Party 1%)
6 February 2016	The Sunday Business Post	Red C	31	10	17	17	3	1	3	2	16 (Note: "Others" includes Independent Alliance 2%)
6 February 2016	Sunday Independent	Millward Brown	27	6	22	21	3	1	1	1	18
4 February 2016	The Irish Times	Ipsos MRBI	28	7	21	19	4	1	2	2	16 (Note: "Others" includes Independent Alliance 3%)
30 January 2016	The Sunday Business Post	Red C	29	10	17	19	3	1	2	3	16
16 January 2016	The Sunday Business Post	Red C	30	9	19	19	3	2	1	2	15
16 January 2016	The Sunday Times	Behaviour & Attitudes	31	6	20	16	3	2	1	3	20 (Note: "Others" includes Workers' Party 2%, and Independent Alliance 3%)
25 February 2011	General election	—	36.1	19.4	17.4	9.9	2.2 (Note: Socialist Party 1.2% and People Before Profit 1% in 2011, they have combined since the 2014 Local Elections, where they ran separately, as the Anti Austerity Alliance-People Before Profit Party abbreviated initially as AAA-PBP and latterly as AAA only.)	—	—	1.8	14.2

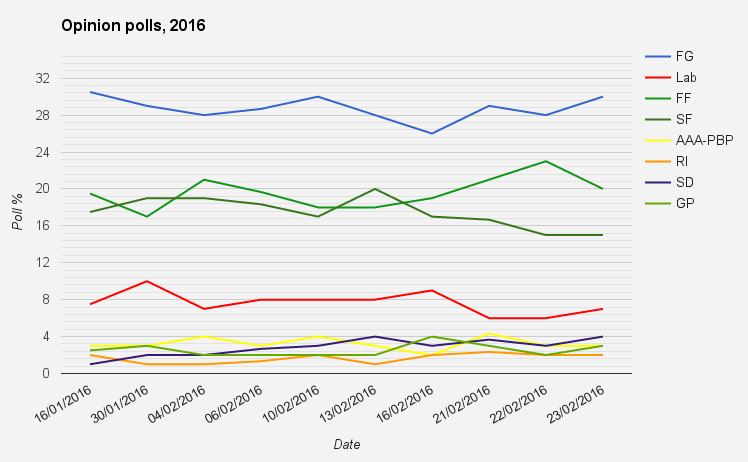

== 2011–2015 ==
=== Graphical summary ===
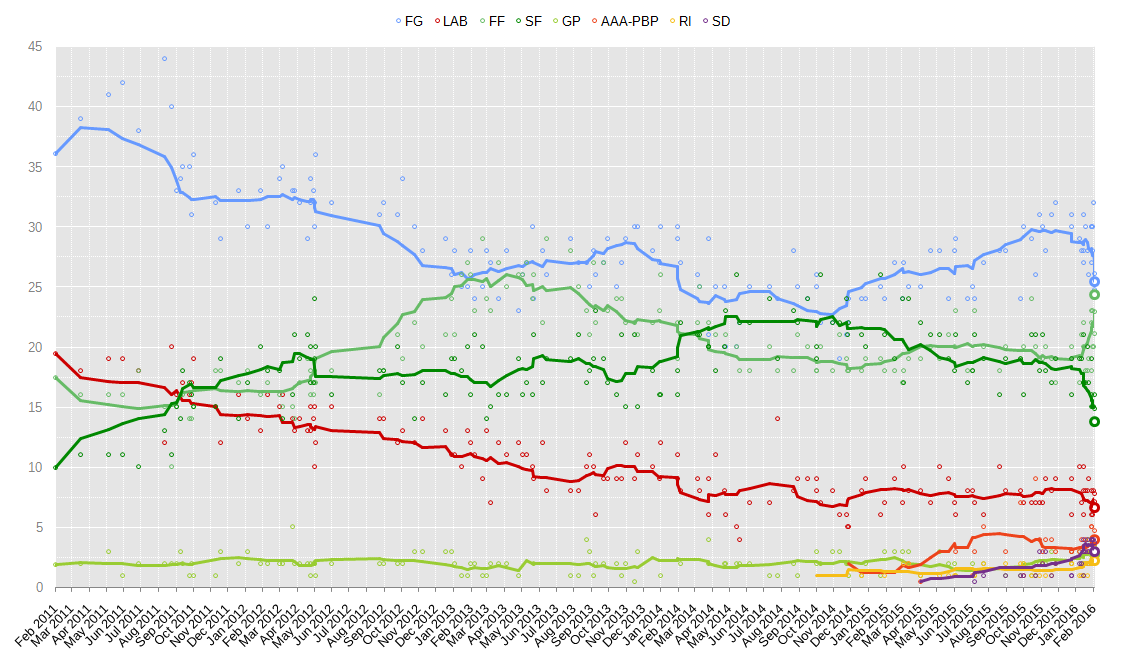

=== Poll results ===
Date	Source/Link	Polling Agency	FG	Lab	FF	SF	GP	AAA-PBP	Others
19 December 2015	The Sunday Business Post	Red C	32	9	17	19	2	3	18 (Note: "Others" includes Social Democrats 2% and Renua 2%)
13 December 2015	The Sunday Times	Behaviour & Attitudes	31	8	19	17	3	4	18 (Note: "Others" includes Social Democrats 1%, Workers' Party 1%, Independent Alliance 2% and Renua 1%)
2 December 2015	Paddy Power	Red C	28	9	20	18	2	4	19 (Note: "Others" includes Social Democrats 3%, Independent Alliance 2% and Renua 1%)
26 November 2015	The Irish Times	Ipsos MRBI	30	7	19	21	2	3	18 (Note: "Others" includes Independent Alliance 3%, Renua 2% and Social Democrats 2%)
21 November 2015	The Sunday Business Post	Red C	31	7	19	18	2	4	19 (Note: "Others" includes Social Democrats 3% and Renua 1%)
14 November 2015	The Sunday Times	Behaviour & Attitudes	26	7	20	21	1	9	16 (Note: "Others" includes Independent Alliance 2%, Renua 1% and Social Democrats 1%)
7 November 2015	Sunday Independent	Millward Brown	29	7	24	21	1	—	19 (Note: "Others" includes Renua 1%)
24 October 2015	The Sunday Business Post	Red C	30	7	20	16	2	1	24 (Note: "Others" includes Renua 2% and Social Democrats 1%)
18 October 2015	The Sunday Times	Behaviour & Attitudes	24	8	19	19	1	7	21 (Note: "Others" includes Independent Alliance 5%, Renua 2%, Social Democrats 1% and Workers' Party 1%)
23 September 2015	The Irish Times	Ipsos MRBI	28	8	20	19	1	3	21 (Note: "Others" includes Independent Alliance 3%, Renua 2% and Social Democrats 1%)
12 September 2015	The Sunday Business Post	Red C	28	10	18	16	—	—	28
15 August 2015	The Sunday Times	Behaviour & Attitudes	27	6	20	19	2	5	23 (Note: "Others" includes Workers' Party 2%, Renua 2% and Social Democrats 1%)
30 July 2015	Sunday Independent	Millward Brown	24	7	23	21	1	3 (Note: 2% reported as Socialist Party)	23 (Note: "Others" includes Renua 1% and Social Democrats 0.5%)
26 July 2015	The Sunday Business Post	Red C	25	8	18	18	2	1	28
18 July 2015	The Sunday Times	Behaviour & Attitudes	24	8	18	17	—	—	32
27 June 2015	Sunday Independent	Millward Brown	29	6	23	21	1	3	17
24 June 2015	The Sunday Business Post (Note: "General Election Opinion Poll - 28th June 2015" (PDF). Red C Research & Marketing Ltd. 28 June 2015. Archived from the original (PDF) on 3 July 2015.The date shown in our table, 24 June 2015, was the last day of polling.)	Red C	28	7	20	18	2 (Note: "Others" includes Renua 1%. The "Others" figure of 27% reported by RTÉ also included 2% Greens.))	—	25
15 June 2015	The Sunday Times (Note: Sunday Times/Behaviour & Attitudes, June 2015 Opinion Poll, 5th - 15th June 2015, prepared for the Sunday Times, prepared by Ian McShane, J.6535 (PDF). Behaviour & Attitudes, Ireland. June 2015. Note: the 1% figure for Renua is from a table (on the second of two pages 16 in this document:) whose other figures match the Unadjusted table (on the first of two pages 8 in this document:); the figures published by RTÉ correspond to the Adjusted table (on the first of two pages 10 in this document:), which has no figure for Renua.)	Behaviour & Attitudes	24	9	21	19	2 (Note: "Others" includes Renua 1%. The "Others" figure of 28% reported by RTÉ also included 2% Greens.))		26
30 May 2015	The Sunday Business Post	Red C	28	10	19	21	3	—	19
14 May 2015	The Irish Times	Ipsos MRBI	28	7	20	21	—	—	24
26 April 2015	The Sunday Business Post	Red C	25	8	19	22	1 (Note: "Others" includes Renua (1%) and the Socialist Party (less than 1%). The "Others" figure of 26% reported by RTÉ also included 1% Greens.))	— (Note: Less than 1%, included in "Others")	24
5 April 2015	Sunday Independent	Millward Brown	25	8	19	24	3	2	18 (Note: "Others" includes Renua 2%)
28 March 2015	The Sunday Business Post	Red C	27	10	18	17	2 (Note: "Others" includes Renua 2%. The "Others" figure of 28% reported by Breaking News also included 2% Greens.))	—	26
26 March 2015	The Irish Times	Ipsos MRBI	24	7	17	24	3	—	25
11 March 2015	The Sunday Times	Behaviour & Attitudes	27	9	18	19	3	—	23
21 February 2015	The Sunday Business Post	Red C	24	7	18	21	3	—	27 (Note: "Others" includes Renua 1% (The reported "others" figure of 30% also included 3% Greens.))
14 February 2015	Sunday Independent (Note: "National Opinion Poll: Early February 2015 - For Publication on 15th February 2015" (PDF). Millward Brown. 15 February 2015.)	Millward Brown	25	6	19	26	1 (Note: The "Others" figure of 24% reported by The Irish Times also included 1% Greens.))	—	23
19 January 2015	The Sunday Business Post	Red C	24	9	19	20	2	—	26
13 January 2015	RTÉ (Today with Sean O'Rourke)	Red C	24	8	18	21	1	—	28 (Note: "Others" includes 1% for Renua, which had not been named at that point.)
21 December 2014	The Sunday Times	Behaviour & Attitudes	24	5	18	22	1	—	29
18 December 2014	Sunday Independent	Millward Brown	22	5	18	21	2	—	32
17 December 2014	The Sunday Business Post	Red C	21	6	19	24	2	—	28
4 December 2014	The Irish Times	Ipsos MRBI	19	6	21	22	3	—	29
23 November 2014	The Sunday Business Post (Note: "Archived copy" (PDF). Archived from the original (PDF) on 24 September 2015.)	Red C	22	8	18	22	3	—	27
2 November 2014	Sunday Independent	Millward Brown	22	7	20	26	2	—	23
26 October 2014	The Sunday Times	Behaviour & Attitudes	25	9	18	19	3	—	25
26 October 2014	The Sunday Business Post	Red C	26	8	18	20	2	—	28
9 October 2014	The Irish Times	Ipsos MRBI	24	9	20	24	—	—	23
21 September 2014	Sunday Independent	Millward Brown	25	9	21	22	1	—	23
14 September 2014	The Sunday Business Post	Red C	28	8	18	23	2	—	23
17 August 2014	The Sunday Times	Behaviour & Attitudes	24	14	18	19	1	—	24
3 August 2014	Sunday Independent	Millward Brown	25	7	20	24	1	—	23
29 June 2014	The Sunday Business Post	Red C	25	7	18	22	2	—	26
12 June 2014	Paddy Power	Red C	22	4	18	22	2	—	32
7 June 2014	Sunday Independent	Millward Brown	20	5	20	26	2	2	25
23 May 2014	European election	—	22.3	5.3	22.3	19.5	4.9	3.3 (Note: Contested as separate parties)	23.9
23 May 2014	Local elections	—	24.0	7.2	25.3	15.2	1.6	2.9	25.5
19 May 2014	Sunday Independent	Millward Brown	20	6	21	23	2	—	27
1 May 2014	The Sunday Business Post	Red C	25	11	21	18	—	—	25
19 April 2014	Sunday Independent	Millward Brown	29	6	22	20	2	—	21
19 April 2014	The Sunday Times	Behaviour & Attitudes	21	9	20	20	4	—	26
3 April 2014	The Irish Times	Ipsos MRBI	25	8	25	21	—	—	21
30 March 2014	The Sunday Business Post	Red C	26	9	22	21	—	—	22
28 February 2014	Sunday Independent	Millward Brown	27	8	21	22	2	—	20
22 February 2014	The Sunday Times	Behaviour & Attitudes	30	9	19	18	—	—	24
22 February 2014	The Sunday Business Post	Red C	29	11	22	16	—	—	22
24 January 2014	Sunday Independent	Millward Brown	30	12	26	16	1	—	15
22 January 2014	The Sunday Business Post	Red C	27	9	23	16	—	—	25
9 January 2014	Paddy Power	Red C	28	10	22	18	—	—	22
15 December 2013	The Sunday Times	Behaviour & Attitudes	30	11	21	15	3 (Note: Others figure of 24% includes 3% for the Green Party)	—	21
10 December 2013	The Irish Times	Ipsos MRBI	30	9	22	21	— (Note: Less than 1%; included in "Others".)	—	18
24 November 2013	The Sunday Business Post	Red C	29	12	22	15	2 (Note: "Independents and other parties" had 19% of the core vote, adjusted to 22% excluding undecided voters. The Green Party was 2 percentage points of the 19% core vote.)	—	20
17 November 2013	Sunday Independent	Millward Brown	27	9	24	21	1	—	18
7 November 2013	Paddy Power	Red C	25	9	24	16	2	—	24
23 October 2013	The Sunday Business Post	Red C	29	9	23	17	—	—	23
1 October 2013	The Irish Times	Ipsos MRBI	26	6	22	23	2	—	21
28 September 2013	Sunday Independent	Millward Brown Lansdowne	28	10	27	19	1	—	15
21 September 2013	The Sunday Times	Behaviour & Attitudes	25	11	21	18	3	—	23
16 September 2013	The Sunday Business Post	Red C	27	10	23	17	4	—	19
1 September 2013	Sunday Independent	Millward Brown Lansdowne	27	8	25	21	1	—	18
18 August 2013	Sunday Independent	Millward Brown Lansdowne	29	8	28	19	1	—	15
7 July 2013	Sunday Independent	Millward Brown Lansdowne	26	8	29	19	—	—	19
30 June 2013	The Sunday Business Post	Red C	28	12	22	17	—	—	21
14 June 2013	The Irish Times	Ipsos MRBI	24	9	26	21	2	—	18
13 June 2013	Paddy Power	Red C	30	10	24	16	—	—	20
2 June 2013	Sunday Independent	Millward Brown Lansdowne	27	11	27	17	—	—	18
26 May 2013	The Sunday Business Post	Red C	26	11	26	16	—	—	21
19 May 2013	Sunday Independent	Millward Brown Lansdowne	23	12	26	19	1	—	18
28 April 2013	The Sunday Business Post	Red C	28	11	25	16	2	—	18
14 April 2013	Sunday Independent	Millward Brown Lansdowne	24	12	27	16	2	—	18
31 March 2013	The Sunday Times	Behaviour & Attitudes	27	7	23	15	2	—	25
24 March 2013	The Sunday Business Post	Red C	28	13	24	14	1	—	20
17 March 2013	Sunday Independent	Millward Brown Lansdowne	25	9	29	20	1	—	16
2 March 2013	Irish Independent	Millward Brown Lansdowne	24	11	23	21	2	—	20
24 February 2013	The Sunday Business Post	Red C	28	12	26	16	2	—	16
18 February 2013	Irish Independent	Millward Brown Lansdowne	25	13	27	20	1	—	15
8 February 2013	The Irish Times	Ipsos MRBI	25	10	26	18	1	—	20
27 January 2013	The Sunday Business Post	Red C	28	11	21	19	2	—	19
21 January 2013	The Sunday Times	Behaviour & Attitudes	26	11	24	19	3	—	18
10 January 2013	Paddy Power	Red C	29	13	21	16	3	—	18
2 December 2012	The Sunday Business Post	Red C	28	14	20	17	3	—	18
18 November 2012	The Sunday Times	Behaviour & Attitudes	30	12	22	14	3	—	19
28 October 2012	The Sunday Business Post	Red C	34	13	19	17	2	—	15
18 October 2012	The Irish Times	Ipsos MRBI	31	12	21	20	2	—	14
23 September 2012	The Sunday Business Post	Red C	32	14	18	18	2	—	16
16 September 2012	The Sunday Times	Behaviour & Attitudes	31	14	16	18	2	—	19
24 June 2012	The Sunday Business Post	Red C	32	15	18	16	2	—	17
27 May 2012	Sunday Independent (Note: "National Opinion Poll / 23rd–24th May 2012". Sunday Independent. 27 May 2012.)	Millward Brown Lansdowne	36	12	17	20	1	—	14
26 May 2012	The Sunday Business Post	Red C	30	15	18	19	2	—	16
25 May 2012	The Irish Times	Ipsos MRBI	32	10	17	24	2	—	15
23 May 2012	The Sunday Times	Behaviour & Attitudes	33	14	16	17	2	—	18
18 May 2012	Paddy Power	Red C	32	13	18	20	2	—	15
18 May 2012	Irish Independent	Millward Brown Lansdowne	34	15	16	17	1	—	17
13 May 2012	The Sunday Business Post	Red C	29	13	19	21	2	—	16
29 April 2012	The Sunday Business Post	Red C	32	14	17	19	2	1	15
17 April 2012	The Sunday Times	Behaviour & Attitudes	33	14	15	16	5	—	18
20 April 2012	The Irish Times	Ipsos MRBI	33	13	14	21	2	—	17
30 March 2012	Paddy Power	Red C	35	16	15	14	2	—	18
25 March 2012	The Sunday Business Post	Red C	34	15	16	18	2	—	15
4 March 2012	The Sunday Business Post	Red C	30	16	17	18	2	—	17
20 February 2012	The Sunday Times	Behaviour & Attitudes	33	13	16	20	2	—	16
29 January 2012	The Sunday Business Post	Red C	30	14	18	17	3	—	18
12 January 2012	Paddy Power	Red C	33	16	17	14	2	—	18
12 December 2011	The Sunday Times	Behaviour & Attitudes	29	12	18	19	3	—	18
4 December 2011	The Sunday Business Post	Red C	32	15	18	15	1	—	19
25 October 2011	The Irish Times	Ipsos MRBI	36	19	15	15	1	—	14
23 October 2011	The Sunday Business Post	Red C	31	17	14	16	2	—	20
18 October 2011	The Sunday Times	Behaviour & Attitudes	35	16	14	17	1	—	16
7 October 2011	The Irish Times	Ipsos MRBI	35	17	16	18	2	—	12
2 October 2011	The Sunday Times	Behaviour & Attitudes	34	16	16	14	3	—	17
25 September 2011	The Sunday Business Post	Red C	33	16	15	15	2	—	19
17 September 2011	Sunday Independent (Note: "Presidential Election Poll Results September 2011" (PDF). Dublin: Millward Brown Lansdowne. 17 September 2011. p. 7.)	Millward Brown Lansdowne	40	20	10	11	2	—	17
4 September 2011	The Sunday Times	Behaviour & Attitudes	44	12	15	13	2	—	12
21 July 2011	The Irish Times	Ipsos MRBI	38	18	18	10	2	—	14
22 June 2011	Irish Independent	Millward Brown Lansdowne	42	19	16	11	1	—	12
29 May 2011	The Sunday Business Post	Red C	41	19	16	11	3	—	10
10 April 2011	The Sunday Business Post	Red C	39	18	16	11	2	—	14
25 February 2011	General election	—	36.1	19.4	17.4	9.9	1.8	2.2 (Note: Socialist Party 1.2% and People Before Profit 1%)	14.2

== Polling Companies ==
Four companies carry out national and sectoral opinion polls in Ireland. They use different methodologies, which can have a bearing on overall accuracy.

Normally the sample size for a national poll is in the very low thousands with a margin of error of ~ 3%

The methodologies used by the four companies are:

Polling Agency	Methodology	Own Statement on Sampling (with page number)
BandA	Face To Face(In Home)	(Page 3)
IpSoS/MRBI	Telephone(Random Autodial)	(Description section at bottom)
Millward Brown	Face To Face (In Home)	(Page 2)
RedC	Telephone(Random Autodial)	(Page 2)
