= Next Irish general election =

Election to the 35th Dáil

- No later than January 2030
- 174 seats in Dáil Éireann; 88 seats needed for a majority
Party	Leader	Current seats
Fianna Fáil	Micheál Martin	48
Sinn Féin	Mary Lou McDonald	39
Fine Gael	Simon Harris	38
Social Democrats	Holly Cairns	12
Labour	Ivana Bacik	11
Independent Ireland	Michael Collins	4
PBP–Solidarity	Collective leadership	3
Aontú	Peadar Tóibín	2
Green	Roderic O'Gorman	1
100% Redress	Tomas Seán Devine	1
Independent	—	14
Ceann Comhairle	Verona Murphy	1
Incumbent Taoiseach
Micheál Martin; Fianna Fáil

The next Irish general election to elect the 35th Dáil must be held no later than January 2030.

== Date of election ==
The 34th Dáil first met on 18 December 2024. Electoral law provides that the "same Dáil shall not continue for a longer period than five years from the date of its first meeting". It must therefore be dissolved no later than 17 December 2029. The taoiseach may advise the president to dissolve at any time. If a taoiseach has ceased to retain the support of the majority of the Dáil, the president may in their absolute discretion refuse to dissolve the Dáil. To date, no president has refused to dissolve the Dáil. When the Dáil is dissolved, the Clerk of the Dáil must issue a writ of election to the returning officer for each constituency. The election must take place on a date set by the Minister for Housing, Local Government and Heritage 18 to 25 days (disregarding any excluded day, being Sundays, public holidays and Good Friday) after the writs have been issued.

== Electoral system ==
There are currently 174 TDs returned in 43 Dáil constituencies of between three and five seats each. The Electoral Commission will be required to review the size of the Dáil and the arrangement of constituencies after the 2027 census. According to the Central Statistics Office, the population is estimated to be 5,458,600 as of April 2025. This would require a minimum of 182 TDs at the next constituency revision.

Under the system of single transferable vote (STV), each voter may mark any number of the candidates in order of preference. The quota is determined at the first count in each constituency by dividing the number of valid ballots by one more than the number of seats (for example a quarter of the valid ballots in a three-seat constituency, a fifth of those in a four-seat constituency, and a sixth of those in a five-seat constituency) and then adding one vote. Any candidate reaching or exceeding the quota is elected.

If in the first count fewer candidates reach the quota than the number of seats to be filled, if any successful candidates have more votes than the quota, their surplus is distributed to remaining candidates based on the next usable marked preference on the ballot papers. If it still happens that fewer candidates have reached the quota than the number of seats to be filled, the last-placed candidate is excluded from the count and those ballot papers are transferred to the next usable marked preference. This is repeated until sufficient candidates have reached the quota to fill the available seats, or where a seat remains to be filled in a constituency and no candidate is capable of achieving a quota as there is nobody left to eliminate for a distribution, then the highest place candidate, even if not having quota, is deemed elected. The Ceann Comhairle (Verona Murphy, since December 2024) immediately before the dissolution of the 34th Dáil will automatically be deemed to be elected a member of the 35th Dáil, unless she decides not to seek re-election. This is provided for under the Constitution and electoral law.

== Opinion polls ==
Various organisations conduct regular opinion polls to gauge voting intentions. Results of such polls are displayed in the lists below.

Opinion polling for Irish general elections
Previous
← 2024 polling

=== Polls ===
Last date of polling	Commissioner	Polling firm	Sample size	Margin of error	Sources	FF	FG	SF	SD	Lab	Aon	II	GP	PBP–S	O/I (Note: The figure for "Others and Independents" is the remainder when all others are removed. As with all such calculations, the figure shown may be slightly inaccurate due to rounding effects.)
30 Oct 2026	Sunday Independent	Ireland Thinks	1,181	2.9		16	18	21	11	3	9	7	3	3	10
21 Oct 2026	Business Post	Red C	1,010	3.0		15	15	22	9	4	8	8	3	4	12
2 Oct 2026	Sunday Independent	Ireland Thinks	1,875	2.3		18	18	19	11	4	8	5	3	3	12
22 Sep 2026	The Irish Times	Ipsos B&A	1,200	~3.0		18	17	23	8	4	5	4	3	3	14
9 Sep 2026	Business Post	Red C	1,010	3.0		14	18	21	11	4	7	5	3	3	13
4 Sep 2026	Sunday Independent	Ireland Thinks	1,044	3.1		17	19	21	10	3	8	7	3	2	10
31 Jul 2026	Sunday Independent	Ireland Thinks	1,384	2.7		16	20	20	10	3	7	7	3	2	12
3 Jul 2026	Sunday Independent	Ireland Thinks	1,279	2.8		17	20	19	12	3	6	7	3	2	11
24 Jun 2026	Business Post	Red C	1,010	3.0		14	18	21	12	4	6	5	3	4	12
5 Jun 2026	Sunday Independent	Ireland Thinks	1,625	2.5		16	19	20	12	3	6	9	3	2	10
27 May 2026	Business Post	Red C	1,010	3.0		15	17	21	10	4	7	7	3	4	11
1 May 2026	Sunday Independent	Ireland Thinks	1,774	2.8		17	17	22	9	4	7	9	3	2	10
22 Apr 2026	Business Post	Red C	1,008	3.0		16	16	25	8	4	6	7	3	3	12
3 Apr 2026	Sunday Independent	Ireland Thinks	1,286	2.8		19	17	22	9	4	6	6	3	3	10
25 Mar 2026	Business Post	Red C	1,010	3.0		16	18	24	8	4	6	5	3	3	13
27 Feb 2026	Sunday Independent	Ireland Thinks	~1,200	2.8		18	17	22	11	4	6	5	4	3	11
19 Feb 2026	Business Post	Red C	1,010	3.0		17	18	23	9	5	5	4	3	3	13
3 Feb 2026	The Irish Times	Ipsos B&A	1,200	2.8		19	18	24	7	4	3	4	4	2	16
30 Jan 2026	Sunday Independent	Ireland Thinks	1,248	2.8		18	18	20	10	4	6	6	3	4	11
21 Jan 2026	Business Post	Red C	1,010	3.0		15	18	24	10	5	5	4	2	3	14
19 Dec 2025	Sunday Independent	Ireland Thinks	~1,000	~3.0		18	17	22	10	4	6	5	2	4	11
5 Dec 2025	Sunday Independent	Ireland Thinks	1,069	3.1		20	17	24	8	5	5	5	2	3	11
26 Nov 2025	Business Post	Red C	1,010	3.0		18	17	22	8	4	6	4	3	2	15
31 Oct 2025	Sunday Independent	Ireland Thinks	1,609	2.5		18	19	23	9	5	6	5	2	3	10
21 Oct 2025	Business Post	Red C	1,012	~3.0		17	19	23	9	4	4	5	3	3	12
15 Oct 2025	The Irish Times	Ipsos B&A	1,200	2.8		17	18	27	6	5	3	2	3	2	17
3 Oct 2025	Sunday Independent	Ireland Thinks	1,500	2.3		20	21	21	8	4	6	4	1	3	11
9 Sep 2025	Business Post	Red C	1,003	3.0		18	19	21	7	4	3	6	3	4	15
5 Sep 2025	Sunday Independent	Ireland Thinks	~1,500	2.3		22	21	20	7	4	4	4	2	3	13
1 Aug 2025	Sunday Independent	Ireland Thinks	1,319	2.7		20	20	20	8	4	4	5	1	3	14
15 Jul 2025	The Irish Times	Ipsos B&A	1,200	2.8		22	17	22	6	4	2	– (Note: Not specifically mentioned in the report)	3	2	22
4 Jul 2025	Sunday Independent	Ireland Thinks	1,532	2.3		19	20	20	8	5	5	6	2	3	11
25 Jun 2025	Business Post	Red C	1,008	3.0		19	18	21	7	4	5	5	3	3	14
30 May 2025	Sunday Independent	Ireland Thinks	1,857	2.3		21	21	20	9	5	5	5	1	3	10
22 May 2025	Business Post	Red C	1,000	3.0		20	19	22	7	5	4	4	3	3	13
2 May 2025	Sunday Independent	Ireland Thinks	1,649	2.5		23	20	22	8	4	4	5	2	3	9
23 Apr 2025	Business Post	Red C	1,000	3.0		20	20	24	7	3	5	5	3	3	10
17 Apr 2025	The Irish Times	Ipsos B&A	1,200	2.8		22	16	26	7	4	1	–	3	3	17
4 Apr 2025	Sunday Independent	Ireland Thinks	2,072	2.2		25	21	21	8	4	4	4	2	3	9
26 Mar 2025	Business Post	Red C	1,002	3.0		22	17	22	7	4	4	4	3	3	13
28 Feb 2025	Sunday Independent	Ireland Thinks	1,373	2.7		22	22	21	7	4	3	5	2	2	11
19 Feb 2025	Business Post	Red C	1,029	3.0		20	20	23	7	4	4	4	3	3	11
1 Feb 2025	Sunday Independent	Ireland Thinks	1,591	2.5		24	20	22	8	4	4	4	3	2	9
22 Jan 2025	Business Post	Red C	1,003	3.1		22	20	22	7	3	4	3	3	2	13
11 Jan 2025	Sunday Independent	Ireland Thinks	1,206	2.9		23.8	22.3	19.3	7.3	3.8	5.3	4.9	2.3	2.2	8.8
29 November 2024	General election	–	–	–	–	21.9	20.8	19.0	4.8	4.7	3.9	3.6	3.0	2.8	15.5
