= Opinion polling for the 2024 Irish general election =

Various organisations conduct regular opinion polls to gauge voting intentions. Results of such polls are displayed in the lists below.

On 1 November, Coimisiún na Meán announced the lifting of the reporting moratorium that had been in place since 1997, and which had prevented election coverage from 14:00 on the day prior to the election until the close of polls. However, the agency also advised broadcasters not to report on opinion polls or exit polls while voting is underway.

Opinion polling for Irish general elections
Previous	Next
← 2020 election	Next election →
← 2020 polling	Current polling →

== National polls ==
The date range for these opinion polls is from the previous Irish general election, held on 8 February 2020, to the election being held on 29 November 2024.

Graph of opinion polls conducted. Trend lines represent local regressions.

Color key:

Exit poll

Last date of polling	Polling firm / Commissioner	Sample size	SF	FF	FG	GP	Lab	SD	PBP–S	Aon	II	O/I (Note: The figure for 'Others/Independents' is the remainder when all others are removed. As with all such calculations, the figure shown may be slightly inaccurate due to rounding effects.)
29 November 2024	General election	–	19.0	21.9	20.8	3.0	4.7	4.8	2.8	3.9	3.6	15.6
29 November 2024	Ipsos B&A/RTÉ/Irish Times/TG4/TCD	5,018	21.1	19.5	21	4	5	5.8	3.1	3.6	2.2	14.6
26 November 2024	Red C/Business Post	1,004	20	21	20	4	4	6	2	4	4	15
23 November 2024	Ipsos B&A/Irish Times	1,200	20	21	19	4	4	6	3	3	– (Note: Not specifically mentioned in the report.)	17
23 November 2024	Ireland Thinks/Sunday Independent	1,420	20	20	22	3	4	5	2	5	–	19
16 November 2024	Opinions/The Sunday Times	1,000	18	20	23	4	4	6	2	2	–	21
13 November 2024	Ipsos B&A/Irish Times	1,200	19	19	25	3	5	4	2	3	–	20
9 November 2024	Red C/Business Post	1,208	18	21	22	4	3	6	2	5	3	16
2 November 2024	Ireland Thinks/Sunday Independent	1,832	18	20	26	4	4	6	2	3	–	16
23 October 2024	Red C/Business Post	1,003	17	21	22	3	4	5	3	3	5	15
16 October 2024	Opinions/The Sunday Times	1,005	16	19	24	4	5	5	3	2	–	22
4 October 2024	Ireland Thinks/Sunday Independent	1,413	19	19	26	4	5	6	2	4	–	16
19 September 2024	Opinions/The Sunday Times	1,000	18	20	24	4	4	5	3	2	–	20
17 September 2024	Ipsos B&A/Irish Times	1,200	20	19	27	5	6	4	2	1	–	16
10 September 2024	Red C/Business Post	1,004	18	18	23	4	4	6	3	4	4	15
31 August 2024	Ireland Thinks/Sunday Independent	1,423	18	21	25	4	4	4	2	3	–	19
3 August 2024	Ireland Thinks/Sunday Independent	1,388	19	20	24	4	4	5	2	4	–	18
8 July 2024	Roderic O'Gorman elected as Leader of the Green Party											
5 July 2024	Ireland Thinks/Sunday Independent	1,394	18	20	24	4	3	4	3	4	–	20
26 June 2024	Red C/Business Post (Note: Thomas, Cónal (29 June 2024). "Fine Gael now largest party as Fianna Fáil jumps four points". Business Post.)	1,000	20	19	21	5	3	5	3	3	5	15
18 June 2024	Eamon Ryan resigns as Leader of the Green Party											
31 May 2024	Ireland Thinks/Sunday Independent	1,770	22	17	22	4	3	5	2	3	–	23
22 May 2024	Red C/Business Post	1,021	23	15	22	4	4	5	3	3	–	21 (Note: Includes 19% for 'Independent' and 2% for 'Other Party'.)
15 May 2024	Opinions/The Sunday Times	1,100	27	16	19	5	3	6	3	3	–	18
15 May 2024	Ipsos B&A/Irish Times	1,500	23	20	23	4	5	3	2	1	–	17
3 May 2024	Ireland Thinks/Sunday Independent	1,316	29	16	19	4	3	6	2	3	–	19
25 April 2024	Red C/Business Post	1,027	27	14	20	3	3	6	2	4	–	21
17 April 2024	Opinions/The Sunday Times	1,100	27	16	20	6	5	4	3	3	–	16
9 April 2024	Simon Harris elected as Taoiseach											
6 April 2024	Ireland Thinks/Sunday Independent	1,334	26	16	21	4	3	6	2	4	–	17
24 March 2024	Simon Harris elected as Leader of Fine Gael											
23 March 2024	Ireland Thinks/Sunday Independent	1,304	27	17	22	4	4	6	2	4	–	14
20 March 2024	Leo Varadkar resigns as Leader of Fine Gael and Taoiseach											
20 March 2024	Red C/Business Post	1,027	25	16	19	4	3	6	3	5	–	19
2 March 2024	Ireland Thinks/Sunday Independent	1,083	27	18	20	4	4	7	2	2	–	17
21 February 2024	Red C/Business Post	1,009	28	16	20	3	4	7	3	3	–	16
6 February 2024	Ipsos B&A/Irish Times	1,200	28	20	19	5	4	4	2	1	–	17
2 February 2024	Ireland Thinks/Sunday Independent	1,394	29	17	19	3	4	5	3	3	–	18
24 January 2024	Red C/Business Post	1,003	25	17	20	4	4	6	3	3	–	18
6 January 2024	Ireland Thinks/Sunday Independent	1,270	30	17	20	3	3	5	3	3	–	17
2 December 2023	Ireland Thinks/Sunday Independent	1,306	28	19	21	3	4	5	4	3	–	14
22 November 2023	Red C/Business Post	1,021	29	16	20	4	4	6	3	2	–	16
3 November 2023	Ireland Thinks/Sunday Independent	1,387	31	18	21	4	3	5	4	3	– (Note: Party did not exist.)	11
25 October 2023	Red C/Business Post	1,018	32	15	20	4	5	6	3	2	–	12
29 September 2023	Ireland Thinks/Sunday Independent	1,196	35	17	19	4	3	5	2	3	–	12
26 September 2023	Ipsos MRBI/Irish Times	1,200	34	20	18	3	3	2	1	1	–	18
12 September 2023	Red C/Business Post	1,011	31	16	21	4	4	5	3	3	–	12
12 September 2023	Behaviour and Attitudes/The Sunday Times	910	33	21	20	6	4	3	2	1	–	9
1 September 2023	Ireland Thinks/Sunday Independent	1,228	33	18	21	2	3	6	3	2	–	10
5 August 2023	Ireland Thinks/Sunday Independent	1,272	34	18	19	5	4	5	3	2	–	10
12 July 2023	Behaviour and Attitudes/The Sunday Times	910	34	24	19	4	4	2	2	1	–	10
1 July 2023	Ireland Thinks/Sunday Independent	1,076	31	19	19	3	2	6	4	3	–	13
21 June 2023	Red C/Business Post	1,011	29	16	22	4	5	5	3	2	–	14
13 June 2023	Ipsos MRBI/Irish Times	1,200	31	21	18	4	4	5	2	1	–	14
2 June 2023	Ireland Thinks/Sunday Independent	1,136	32	19	20	3	3	6	2	3	–	13
24 May 2023	Red C/Business Post	1,011	34	15	20	4	4	6	3	1	–	13
9 May 2023	Behaviour and Attitudes/The Sunday Times	906	35	22	17	5	4	3	1	1	–	12
6 May 2023	Ireland Thinks/Sunday Independent	1,175	31	19	20	3	4	5	4	2	–	12
26 April 2023	Red C/Business Post	1,016	31	16	22	4	4	5	2	2	–	14
4 April 2023	Behaviour and Attitudes/The Sunday Times	909	37	21	15	6	4	4	2	2	–	8
1 April 2023	Ireland Thinks/Sunday Independent	1,102	31	16	22	4	3	7	3	3	–	10
22 March 2023	Red C/Business Post	1,005	31	15	22	3	4	6	3	2	–	14
14 March 2023	Behaviour and Attitudes/The Sunday Times	943	32	20	23	5	5	4	2	–	–	9
3 March 2023	Ireland Thinks/Sunday Independent	1,162	29	19	21	4	3	9	2	3	–	10
1 March 2023	Holly Cairns elected as Leader of the Social Democrats											
22 February 2023	Catherine Murphy and Róisín Shortall resign as Co-Leaders of the Social Democrats											
22 February 2023	Red C/Business Post	998	31	17	21	4	4	4	3	2	–	14
21 February 2023	Ipsos MRBI/Irish Times	1,200	35	18	22	4	4	2	–	–	–	16
14 February 2023	Behaviour and Attitudes/The Sunday Times	921	31	24	23	5	5	2	1	–	–	9
3 February 2023	Ireland Thinks/Sunday Independent	1,212	31	18	22	4	4	4	3	4	–	10
25 January 2023	Red C/Business Post	1,004	33	15	21	4	4	6	3	2	–	12
17 January 2023	Behaviour and Attitudes/The Sunday Times	936	34	25	19	5	4	2	2	1	–	8
6 January 2023	Ireland Thinks/Sunday Independent	1,104	32	16	25	4	3	3	4	3	–	10
17 December 2022	Leo Varadkar elected as Taoiseach											
17 December 2022	Micheál Martin resigns as Taoiseach											
6 December 2022	Behaviour and Attitudes/The Sunday Times	923	34	21	23	5	3	1	1	–	–	12
2 December 2022	Ireland Thinks/Sunday Independent	1,352	34	17	23	3	3	5	3	4	–	9
23 November 2022	Red C/Business Post	>1,000	31	15	24	5	4	4	3	2	–	11
8 November 2022	Behaviour and Attitudes/The Sunday Times	923	34	23	21	4	5	2	1	1	–	9
4 November 2022	Ireland Thinks/Sunday Independent	1,002	34	17	21	3	3	4	5	4	–	10
25 October 2022	Ipsos MRBI/Irish Times	1,200	35	21	22	4	3	3	2	1	–	10
15 October 2022	Behaviour and Attitudes/The Sunday Times	931	34	22	21	4	6	2	2	0	–	9
1 October 2022	Ireland Thinks/Sunday Independent	1,254	37	17	21	4	3	3	4	3	–	8
6 September 2022	Red C/Business Post	1,004	35	17	18	5	4	4	3	2	–	12
6 September 2022	Behaviour and Attitudes/The Sunday Times	905	35	24	20	5	4	3	2	0	–	8
3 September 2022	Ireland Thinks/Sunday Independent	1,127	36	16	21	2	3	4	5	3	–	11
6 August 2022	Ireland Thinks/Sunday Independent	1,180	36	17	22	4	3	4	4	3	–	9
12 July 2022	Ipsos MRBI/Irish Times	1,200	36	20	18	3	4	2	3	1	–	14
1 July 2022	Ireland Thinks/Sunday Independent	1,133	36	15	22	4	4	3	3	3	–	10
22 June 2022	Red C/Business Post	1,004	36	14	19	4	3	4	4	3	–	12
7 June 2022	Behaviour and Attitudes/The Sunday Times	?	37	22	23	4	5	0	1	1	–	8
4 June 2022	Ireland Thinks/Sunday Independent	1,211	35	17	20	3	4	5	3	3	–	8
25 May 2022	Red C/Business Post	1,000+	36	15	20	5	3	4	3	2	–	11
10 May 2022	Behaviour and Attitudes/The Sunday Times	908	36	24	19	2	5	2	2	1	–	9
7 May 2022	Ireland Thinks/Sunday Independent	1,002	34	16	23	3	4	4	4	3	–	8
27 April 2022	Red C/Business Post	1,014	34	16	21	4	4	5	3	2	–	11
1 April 2022	Ireland Thinks/Sunday Independent	1,135	33	18	22	3	4	6	2	3	–	10
24 March 2022	Ivana Bacik elected as Leader of the Labour Party											
23 March 2022	Red C/Business Post	1,001	33	16	19	5	5	5	3	2	–	12
8 March 2022	Behaviour and Attitudes/The Sunday Times	928	33	23	24	4	3	1	2	1	–	9
4 March 2022	Ireland Thinks/Sunday Independent	1,011	31	20	21	4	3	6	4	2	–	9
2 March 2022	Alan Kelly resigns as Leader of the Labour Party											
23 February 2022	Red C/Business Post	1,001	33	17	20	5	4	4	3	2	–	11
8 February 2022	Behaviour and Attitudes/The Sunday Times	922	34	25	20	5	4	2	1	0	–	9
5 February 2022	Ireland Thinks/Sunday Independent	1,086	32	17	23	4	3	5	3	3	–	10
26 January 2022	Red C/Business Post	1,001	33	15	21	6	4	5	2	2	–	12
18 January 2022	Behaviour and Attitudes/The Sunday Times	?	34	24	22	3	4	1	2	0	–	10
8 January 2022	Ireland Thinks/Sunday Independent	1,369	33	19	23	3	4	4	3	2	–	9
12 December 2021	Ireland Thinks/Irish Mail on Sunday	?	31	17	25	4	4	3	4	3	–	9
8 December 2021	Behaviour and Attitudes/The Sunday Times	933	34	23	20	5	5	2	1	0	–	9
8 December 2021	Ipsos MRBI/Irish Times	1,200	35	20	20	5	4	2	2	1	–	10
25 November 2021	Red C/Business Post	1,001	33	15	22	5	4	5	2	2	–	10
14 November 2021	Ireland Thinks/Irish Mail on Sunday	?	32	17	24	5	5	4	3	3	–	7
9 November 2021	Behaviour and Attitudes/The Sunday Times	912	37	20	21	5	3	3	1	1	–	8
22 October 2021	Red C/Business Post	?	33	12	25	4	5	6	3	2	–	10
16 October 2021	Ireland Thinks/Irish Mail on Sunday	1,200	31	16	26	6	4	4	3	3	–	–
12 October 2021	Behaviour and Attitudes/The Sunday Times	943	31	23	21	5	5	4	1	1	–	8
5 October 2021	Ipsos MRBI/Irish Times	1,200	32	20	22	7	4	3	2	1	–	10
18 September 2021	Ireland Thinks/Irish Mail on Sunday	1,000	29	19	23	4	4	6	4	4	–	–
9 September 2021	Red C/Business Post	1,031	29	13	28	4	5	5	3	2	–	10
8 September 2021	Behaviour and Attitudes/The Sunday Times	922	33	21	23	5	5	2	2	0	–	8
21 August 2021	Ireland Thinks/Irish Mail on Sunday	1,203	30	15	24	4	6	6	3	3	–	9
17 July 2021	Ireland Thinks/Irish Mail on Sunday	1,001	30	14	25	4	7	5	4	4	–	7
13 July 2021	Behaviour and Attitudes/The Sunday Times	894	30	20	25	5	5	1	3	1	–	10
26 June 2021	Red C/Business Post	1,020	29	13	30	5	3	4	2	2	–	12
19 June 2021	Ireland Thinks/Irish Mail on Sunday	1,274	32	15	24	3	4	5	4	4	–	10
15 June 2021	Ipsos MRBI/Irish Times	1,200	31	20	27	6	3	2	2	1	–	8
8 June 2021	Behaviour and Attitudes/The Sunday Times	909	34	20	24	4	3	4	1	1	–	9
27 May 2021	Red C/Business Post	1,034	29	14	29	5	3	5	3	2	–	10
18 May 2021	Behaviour and Attitudes/The Sunday Times	914	30	22	28	5	4	2	1	–	–	8
15 May 2021	Ireland Thinks/Irish Mail on Sunday	1,237	30	15	25	3	4	7	3	4	–	9
22 April 2021	Red C/Business Post	1,025	27	13	30	4	5	5	2	2	–	11
15 April 2021	Ireland Thinks/Irish Mail on Sunday	1,087	27	16	26	3	5	6	3	4	–	10
25 March 2021	Red C/Business Post	1,000	29	11	30	5	4	5	2	2	–	11
20 March 2021	Ireland Thinks/Irish Mail on Sunday	1,026	31	14	27	2	5	7	3	3	–	8
25 February 2021	Red C/Business Post	1,000	29	13	29	3	4	6	2	2	–	12
23 February 2021	Ipsos MRBI/Irish Times	1,200	28	14	30	6	3	3	1	1	–	14
12 February 2021	Ireland Thinks/Irish Mail on Sunday	1,068	28	15	26	5	5	6	3	4	–	9
28 January 2021	Red C/Business Post	1,000	27	16	29	5	3	5	3	2	–	10
17 January 2021	Ireland Thinks/Irish Mail on Sunday	1,247	29	15	28	3	5	5	3	4	–	7
15 December 2020	Behaviour and Attitudes/The Sunday Times	916	32	22	27	3	5	1	2	0	–	7
29 November 2020	Ireland Thinks/Irish Mail on Sunday	1,044	28	17	28	4	4	5	2	4	–	9
25 November 2020	Red C/Business Post	1,000	30	12	33	5	3	4	3	2	–	8
24 October 2020	Red C/Business Post	1,000	27	11	37	6	3	3	2	2	–	9
17 October 2020	Behaviour and Attitudes/The Sunday Times	931	30	19	31	5	4	2	2	1	–	5
6 October 2020	Ipsos MRBI/Irish Times	1,200	29	17	35	4	4	2	1	–	–	8
26 September 2020	Ireland Thinks/Irish Mail on Sunday	1,200	28	14	32	4	4	5	3	3	–	7
15 September 2020	Behaviour and Attitudes/The Sunday Times	900	32	19	30	5	3	1	1	0	–	9
9 September 2020	Red C/Business Post	1,000	27	10	35	6	3	4	2	2	–	10
22 August 2020	Ireland Thinks/Irish Mail on Sunday	1,000	30	11	35	3	5	5	2	2	–	7
28 July 2020	Behaviour and Attitudes/The Sunday Times	921	30	20	29	6	3	1	1	0	–	11
18 July 2020	Ireland Thinks/Irish Mail on Sunday	1,000	26	12	38	5	4	3	2	–	–	10
20 June 2020	Ireland Thinks/Irish Mail on Sunday	1,000	27	13	34	8	4	3	2	–	–	10
14 June 2020	Ipsos MRBI/|Irish Times	1,200	25	13	37	12	2	(Note: The figure for 'Others/Independents' is the remainder when all others are removed. In the MRBI poll conducted up to 14 June 2020, this figure appears to include all independents as well as all of PBP–S, Aontú and the Social Democrats.)			–	10
27 May 2020	Red C/Business Post	1,000	27	15	35	5	3	4	2	1	–	8
23 May 2020	Ireland Thinks/Irish Mail on Sunday	1,012	27	16	36	6	4	3	2	–	–	6
3 April 2020	Alan Kelly elected as Leader of the Labour Party											
29 April 2020	Red C/Business Post	1,019	27	14	35	7	3	3	2	1	–	8
25 March 2020	Red C/Business Post	1,062	28	18	34	5	3	3	2	2	–	5
10 March 2020	Behaviour and Attitudes/The Sunday Times	912	35	19	21	6	3	1	3	0	–	11
25 February 2020	Behaviour and Attitudes/The Sunday Times	917	35	20	18	6	3	2	3	1	–	12
16 February 2020	Amárach Research/Extra.ie	1,040	35	17	18	9	3	5	3	–	–	10
12 February 2020	Brendan Howlin resigns as Leader of the Labour Party											
8 February 2020	General election	–	24.5	22.2	20.9	7.1	4.4	2.9	2.6	1.9	–	13.5

== Constituency polling ==
=== Donegal ===
Last date of polling	Polling firm / Commissioner	Sample size	SF	FF	FG	GP	PBP–S	Aon	100%R	IF	Pringle	McConnell
29 November 2024	General election	–	41.8	23.9	9.0	1.1	0.8	3.2	9.0	0.5	6.9	2.0
22 November 2024	Tirconaill Tribune	872	42	23	12	0	0	3	7	1	7	2
16 November 2024	Ipsos MRBI/TG4	543	35	25	12	2	1	4	6	1	11	2
8 February 2020	General election		45.1	20.4	13.8	2.1	–	3.1	–	–	7.1	0.8

=== Galway West ===
Last date of polling	Polling firm / Commissioner	Sample size	SF	FF	FG	GP	Lab	SD	PBP–S	Aon	II	Connolly	Grealish	Cubbard
29 November 2024	General election	–	13.5	16.8	18.8	3.1	3.3	3.6	1.5	2.0	9.5	11.2	11.4	3.7
12 November 2024	Ipsos MRBI/TG4	531	9	14	23	5	4	4	2	2	8	13	12	3
8 February 2020	General election		14.0	22.7	18.1	6.0	2.6	6.0	1.5	1.8	–	9.0	13.3	4.4

=== Kerry ===
Last date of polling	Polling firm / Commissioner	Sample size	SF	FF	FG	GP	Lab	PBP–S	Aon	M. Healy-Rae	D. Healy-Rae	Others/Independents
29 November 2024	General election	–	16.3	26.2	10.1	2.5	2.3	1.3	1.8	23.7	11.0	4.8
22 November 2024	Ipsos MRBI/TG4	521	15	24	14	3	2	1	1	27	10	5
8 February 2020	General election		20.3	15.8	18.4	5.3	–	–	1.4	21.6	11.2	1.15

=== Mayo ===
Last date of polling	Polling firm / Commissioner	Sample size	SF	FF	FG	GP	Lab	PBP–S	Aon	Others/Independents
29 November 2024	General election	–	19.4	20.0	35.1	1.3	–	1.7	6.3	16.2
19 November 2024	Ipsos MRBI/TG4	539	18	21	39	2	–	2	7	11
8 February 2020	General election		22.7	24.1	39.5	6.5	0.4	1.1	0.4	5.3
