= Independent Alliance (Ireland) =

- Leader: None
- Founded: 30 March 2015
- Dissolved: 2020
- Ideology: Nonpartisan politics
- Political position: Big tent
- Type: Political group

The Independent Alliance (Irish: Comhghualaíocht Neamhspleách) was an Irish political grouping formed in March 2015 by independent politicians. It was founded by Shane Ross and Michael Fitzmaurice. It was not a political party and stated that it would not impose any whip on elected members except if the group agreed to support a government on confidence motions. After the 2016 general election, its members became part of a minority government with Fine Gael and other non-aligned Independent ministers.

== Representation ==
=== 2015 ===
Prior to the 2016 general election, the alliance counted among its members five independent TDs of the 31st Dáil and two senators of the 24th Seanad; within the Oireachtas, it comprised TDs Shane Ross, Michael Fitzmaurice, Finian McGrath, John Halligan, and Tom Fleming and Senators Feargal Quinn and Gerard Craughwell.

Councillors who were members of the alliance were represented on Donegal, Fingal, Galway, Kildare, Louth, Meath, Offaly, Sligo, South Dublin and Westmeath County Councils, along with a councillor on Cork City Council.

=== 2016 ===
20 members of the alliance ran as independent candidates at the 2016 general election. Six candidates were elected: Seán Canney, Michael Fitzmaurice, John Halligan, Finian McGrath, Kevin "Boxer" Moran and Shane Ross.

Gerard Craughwell was re-elected as a senator in April 2016 after the general election, but he announced on 29 April that he had left the group because he was excluded from the group's negotiations with Fine Gael on supporting a government. On 18 May, Michael Fitzmaurice, who had been the only Alliance TD not to vote for Enda Kenny as Taoiseach, announced that he was leaving the group.

After the election of Kenny as Taoiseach, the members of the Alliance entered government, with Ross serving as Minister for Transport, Tourism and Sport and McGrath, Halligan and Canney serving as Ministers of State.

=== 2017–2020 ===
In 2017 Canney stepped down to allow for his replacement by Moran as Minister of State for the Office of Public Works. All Alliance ministers retained their positions under Leo Varadkar's government in 2017.

Canney left the Independent Alliance in May 2018 but pledged his continued support for the government.

On 13 January 2020, Moran announced he was leaving the Alliance and would stand as an "outright Independent" in the 2020 general election. On 14 January 2020, after the calling of the 2020 general election, Finian McGrath announced he would not stand for re-election. On 15 January 2020, John Halligan announced he would not stand for re-election, which left Shane Ross as the sole member of the Alliance. Moran and Ross lost their seats at the 2020 general election, which left the Alliance with no elected members. Ross did not make a public statement about the status of the Independent Alliance, but during the campaign he campaigned as an independent, with the brand of Independent Alliance not appearing on his election literature or advertising. During and after the 2020 election, the Independent Alliance was effectively defunct, with no public statements being made on behalf of the group.

== Ideology ==
With no policies or whip and with members from across the right-left political spectrum, the alliance did not have a cohesive ideology. The group's website set out a list of "principles and priorities", based around general themes of political reform that the alliance had claimed would form a charter for its election candidates. The group regarded whips as "a regressive force in Irish politics".

== Election results ==
The Independent Alliance was not a registered party and so appeared as non-party on the ballot paper. Its collective results were as follows:

| Election | Seats won | ± | Position | First Pref votes | % | Government |
|---|---|---|---|---|---|---|
| 2016 | 6 / 158 | ▲1 | N/A | 88,930 | 4.2% | Minority FG-Ind Government |
