= 2016 Irish general election =

Election to the 32nd Dáil

- 26 February 2016

158 seats in Dáil Éireann (Note: Including Seán Barrett (FG), returned automatically for Dún Laoghaire as outgoing Ceann Comhairle, under Art. 16.6 of the Constitution and the Electoral Act 1992.) (Note: The last election was for a Dáil with 166 seats.) 80 seats needed for a majority
- Opinion polls
- Turnout: 65.1% ▼4.8 pp
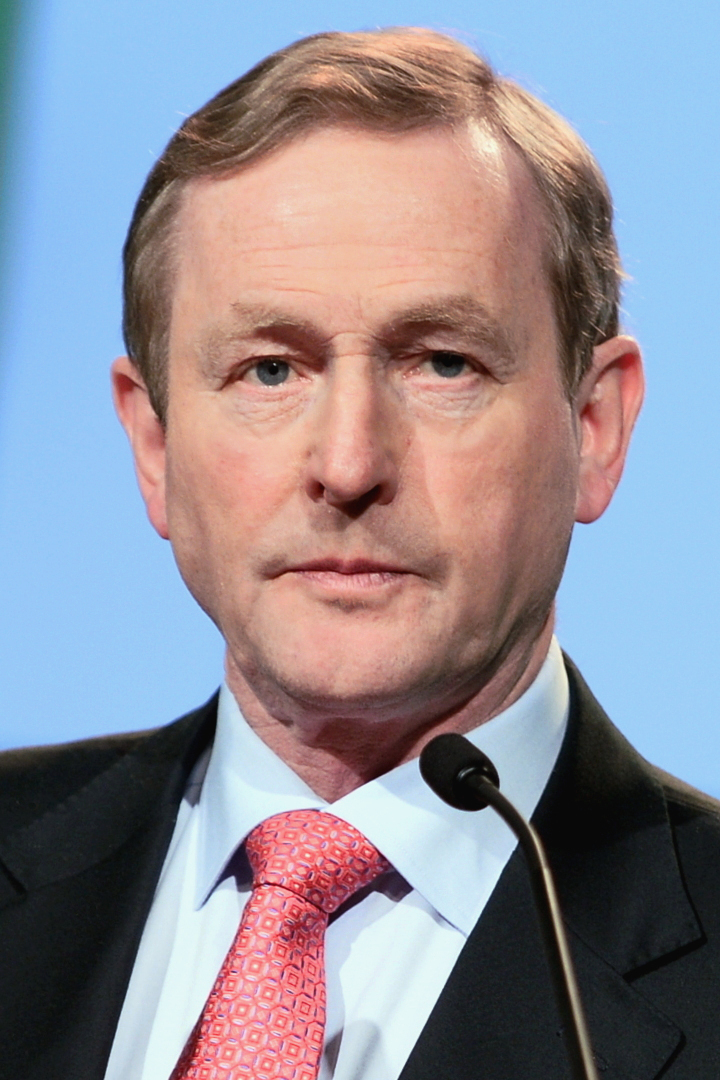

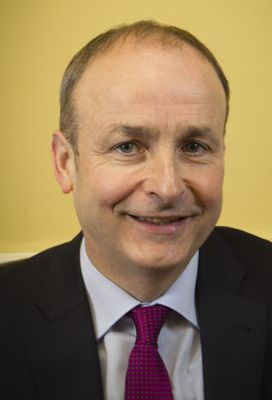

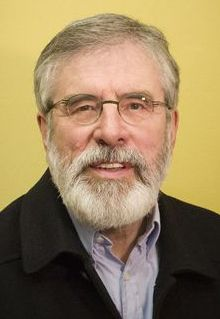

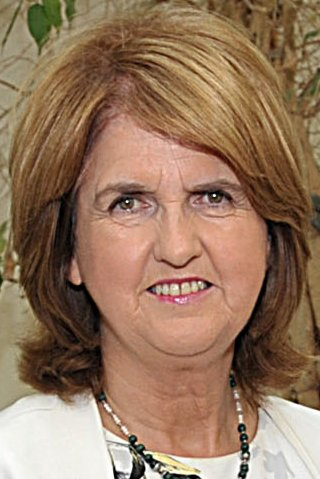

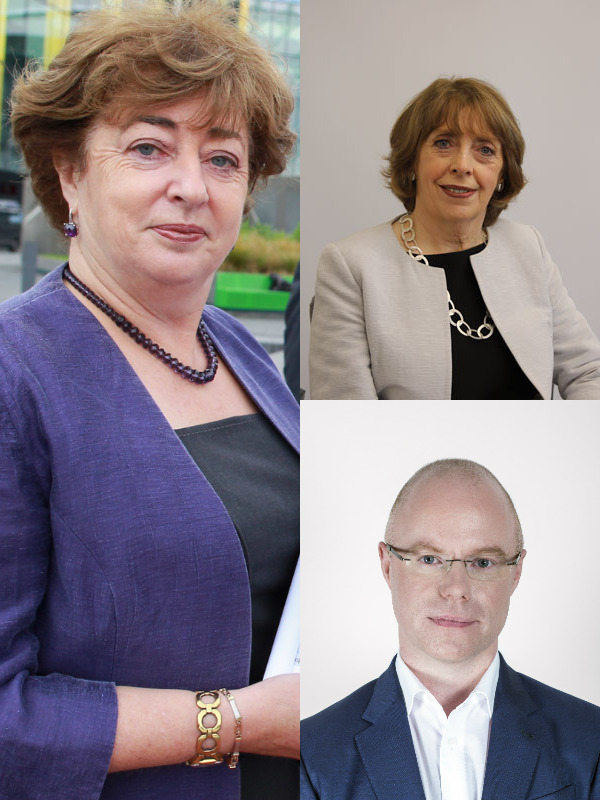

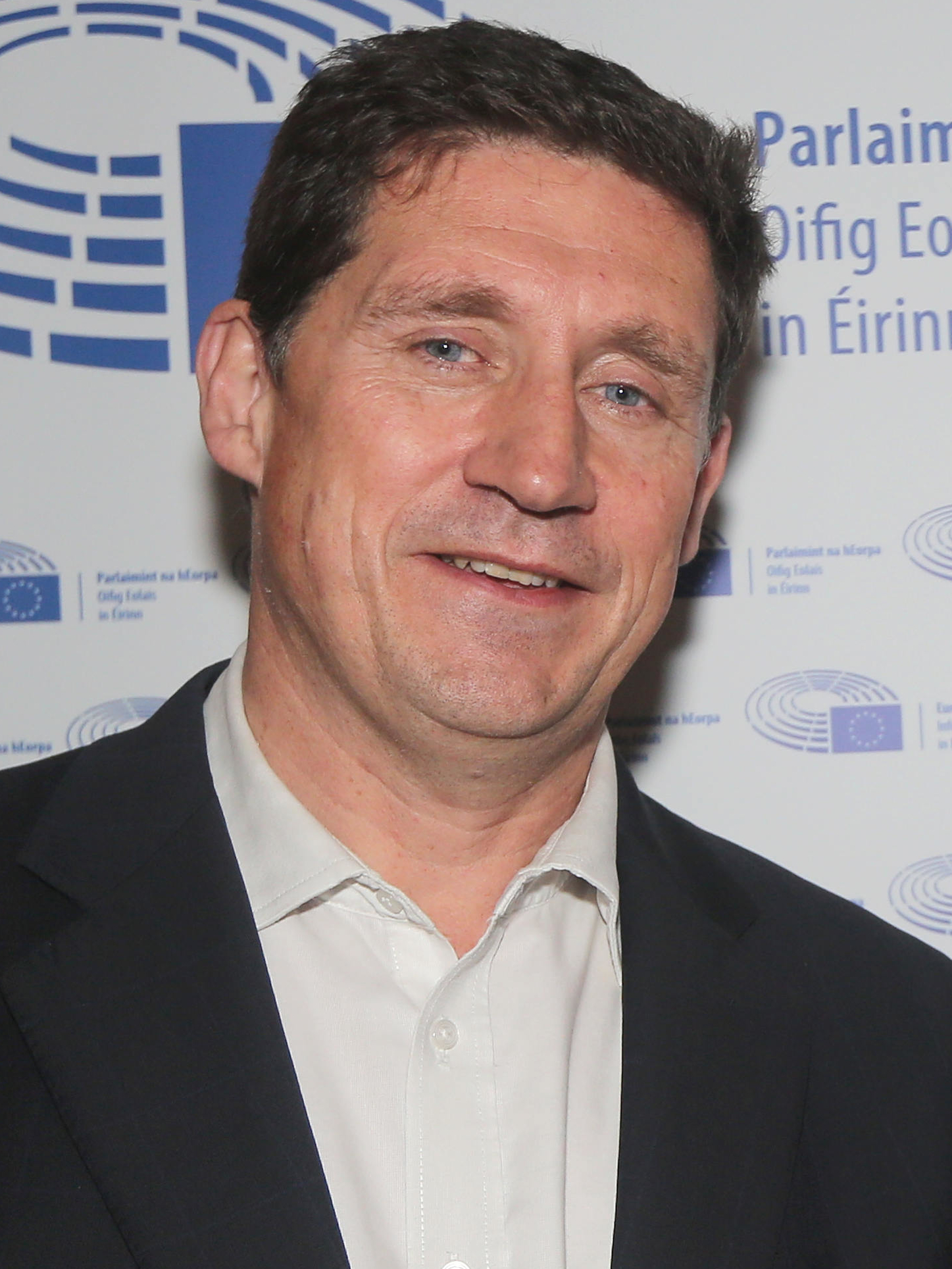

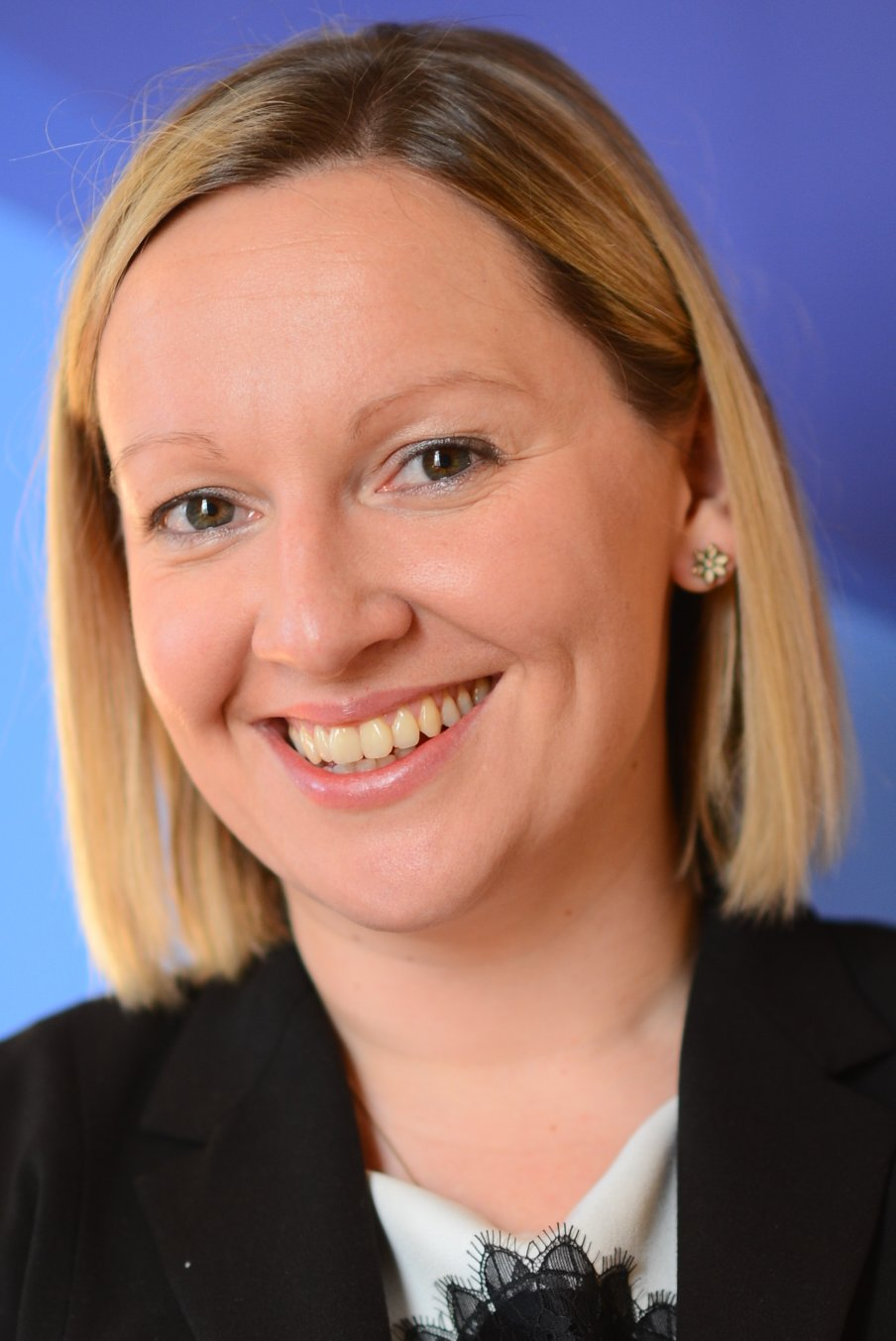
	First party	Second party	Third party
Leader	Enda Kenny	Micheál Martin	Gerry Adams
Party	Fine Gael	Fianna Fáil	Sinn Féin
Leader since	2 June 2002	26 January 2011	13 November 1983 (Note: Gerry Adams became President of Sinn Féin on 13 November 1983, but only became parliamentary leader of Sinn Féin in the Dáil once elected to the Dáil for the first time in February 2011. Prior to that its parliamentary leader in the Dáil since 1997 was Caoimhghín Ó Caoláin.)
Leader's seat	Mayo	Cork South-Central	Louth
Last election	76 seats, 36.1%	20 seats, 17.4%	14 seats, 9.9%
Seats won	50	44	23
Seat change	▼26	▲24	▲9
Popular vote	544,140	519,356	295,319
Percentage	25.5%	24.3%	13.8%
Swing	▼10.6 pp	▲6.9 pp	▲3.9 pp
	Fourth party	Fifth party	Sixth party
		AAA–PBP	I4C
Leader	Joan Burton	—	—
Party	Labour	AAA–PBP	Inds. 4 Change
Leader since	4 July 2014	—	—
Leader's seat	Dublin West	—	—
Last election	37 seats, 19.4%	4 seats, 2.2% (Note: Anti-Austerity Alliance–People Before Profit (AAA–PBP) was formed in 2015 by the AAA and PBP, and the AAA was formed in 2012 by the Socialist Party. The 2011 seats and votes figures used for comparison are the combined votes and seats of Socialist Party and PBP candidates.)	Did not exist
Seats won	7	6	4
Seat change	▼30	▲2	▲4
Popular vote	140,898	84,168	31,365
Percentage	6.6%	3.9%	1.5%
Swing	▼12.8 pp	▲1.7 pp	Did not exist
	Seventh party	Eighth party	Ninth party
Leader	Catherine Murphy; Róisín Shortall; Stephen Donnelly	Eamon Ryan	Lucinda Creighton
Party	Social Democrats	Green	Renua
Leader since	15 July 2015	27 May 2011	13 March 2015
Leader's seat	Wicklow; Kildare North; Dublin North-West	Dublin Bay South	Dublin Bay South (defeated)
Last election	Did not exist	0 seats, 1.8%	Did not exist
Seats won	3	2	0
Seat change	0	▲2	▼3
Popular vote	64,094	57,999	46,552
Percentage	3.0%	2.7%	2.2%
Swing	New	▲0.9 pp	Did not exist
Taoiseach before election
Enda Kenny
Fine Gael
Taoiseach after election
Enda Kenny
Fine Gael

The 2016 Irish general election to the 32nd Dáil was held on Friday 26 February, following the dissolution of the 31st Dáil by President Michael D. Higgins on 3 February, at the request of Taoiseach Enda Kenny. The general election took place in 40 Dáil constituencies throughout Ireland to elect 158 Teachtaí Dála to Dáil Éireann, the house of representatives of the Oireachtas. There was a reduction of eight seats under the Electoral (Amendment) (Dáil Constituencies) Act 2013. Fine Gael were returned to government as a minority administration.

Fine Gael, led by Kenny, lost 26 seats, but remained the largest party in the Dáil with 50 seats. The main opposition party Fianna Fáil, which in 2011 had suffered its worst-ever election result of 20 seats, increased to 44 seats. Sinn Féin became the third-largest party with 23 seats. The Labour Party, which had been the junior party in coalition government with Fine Gael and which had returned its best-ever showing of 37 seats in 2011, fell to just 7 seats, its lowest-ever share of Dáil seats at the time. Smaller parties and independent politicians made up the remaining 34 seats.

The 32nd Dáil met on 10 March and elected a new Ceann Comhairle, the first to be elected by secret ballot, which was won by Seán Ó Fearghaíl of Fianna Fáil. The Dáil proceeded to the nomination of Taoiseach, but no candidate received a majority. Kenny formally resigned as Taoiseach that same day, but remained as caretaker until a new government was formed. Kenny sought an agreement with Fianna Fáil to form a government, and negotiations continued through most of April. An agreement was finally reached in which Fianna Fáil would tolerate a Fine Gael–led minority government on 29 April, 63 days after the election, and the Dáil formally re-elected Kenny as Taoiseach on 6 May. Kenny was the first Taoiseach from Fine Gael to win re-election.

Following the introduction of gender quotas, a record 35 seats were filled by women, bringing the proportion of women in the Dáil to 22 percent, up from 15 percent at the previous general election.

== Background ==
The outgoing government was a Fine Gael–Labour Party coalition led by Taoiseach Enda Kenny and Tánaiste Joan Burton. Fianna Fáil, Sinn Féin, Anti-Austerity Alliance–People Before Profit, Renua, Social Democrats, Workers and Unemployed Action, and independent non-party TDs formed the opposition in the Dáil. The government was formed on 9 March 2011, the first day of the 31st Dáil elected on 25 February 2011.

Whereas the Constitution gives the President authority to dissolve the Dáil, under electoral law the precise date of polling is specified by the Minister for the Environment, Community and Local Government, who was Alan Kelly of Labour. Electoral law required the 31st Dáil to be dissolved by 9 March 2016. Kenny rejected predictions in October 2015 that he would call an election in November to capitalise on rising Fine Gael support. In January 2016, media reported that Fine Gael and Labour respectively favoured Thursday 25 and Friday 26 February 2016 as the election date; Friday would facilitate voting by students registered to vote at their family home.

After a cabinet meeting on 2 February, Kenny announced that he would be seeking a dissolution the following day. At 09:30 on 3 February he formally told the Dáil this, and that the new Dáil would meet on 10 March; the Dáil was adjourned without statements from the opposition. At 09:58 while Kenny was en route to Áras an Uachtaráin to meet the President, the election date of 26 February was confirmed from his Twitter account. At 10:35 the President issued the proclamation dissolving the Dáil. Later that day, Minister Kelly signed the order setting the polling day. The writs of election are issued by the clerk of the Dáil.

=== New parties and alliances ===
A number of parties and political alliances were formed during the lifespan of the 31st Dáil in order to contest the election:

- On 14 March 2014, the Independents for Equality Movement was registered as a political party by non-party TDs in advance of the 2014 local elections. Founded by Wexford TD Mick Wallace, it was renamed Independents 4 Change in October 2015. By the time the 31st Dáil was dissolved it counted among its members Wallace, Joan Collins, Clare Daly and Tommy Broughan, but all remained listed on the Dáil register as independent members of the house. All four members as well as one other councillor entered the election as Independents 4 Change candidates.
- On 13 March 2015, Renua was founded by TDs and a Senator who had been expelled from the Fine Gael parliamentary party in 2013 for voting against the Protection of Life During Pregnancy Bill on anti-abortion grounds. Lucinda Creighton led this party into the election.
- On 30 March 2015, the Independent Alliance was formed by non-party TDs and founded by Shane Ross and Michael Fitzmaurice. It was not a political party, and stated that it would not impose a whip except where the group had agreed to support a government on confidence motions.
- On 15 July 2015, the Social Democrats were founded by Róisín Shortall, elected to the 31st Dáil as a Labour Party TD; Catherine Murphy, who was also a member of the Labour Party until 2003 but was elected to the 31st Dáil as an independent non-party TD, and Stephen Donnelly who was elected to the 31st Dáil as an independent non-party TD. All three entered the election as co-leaders of the Social Democrats.
- In August 2015, Right2Change was launched as a broad political campaigning platform based on the Right2Water campaign that had been ongoing since 2014 against the introduction of water charges in Ireland. Right2Change produced a document of policy principles for "a progressive Irish government" and promoted a vote transfer pact, to which several bodies subscribed in advance of the 2016 election, including Sinn Féin, the People Before Profit Alliance, Workers and Unemployed Action, Direct Democracy Ireland, the Communist Party of Ireland; the individual TDs Joan Collins, Clare Daly, Thomas Pringle, Tommy Broughan and Mick Wallace; and the trade unions Unite the Union, the Communication Workers Union, and Mandate.
- On 6 October 2015, the Anti-Austerity Alliance–People Before Profit were founded as a registered party, to serve as an electoral alliance of the Anti-Austerity Alliance and the People Before Profit Alliance. They had contested the 2011 general election as separate parties, as the Socialist Party and the People Before Profit Alliance respectively, under the joint platform of the United Left Alliance (which had included the Workers and Unemployed Action Group and left wing independent politicians).

=== Gender quotas ===
Part 6 of the Electoral (Amendment) (Political Funding) Act 2012 provides that parties will lose half of their state funding unless at least 30% of their candidates at the election are female and at least 30% are male. All parties except Direct Democracy Ireland fulfilled this condition. This contributed in part to the highest percentage of women elected to the Dáil; at 35 TDs, this was 22% of the 158 TDs, an increase from 15% at the previous general election.

== Electoral system ==
Constituencies for 2016 general election

Ireland uses proportional representation with a single transferable vote (PR–STV). The general election took place throughout the state to elect 158 members of Dáil Éireann, a reduction of 8 from the previous 166 members. This follows the passage of the Electoral (Amendment) (Dáil Constituencies) Act 2013. The Ceann Comhairle (speaker of the lower house of parliament) is automatically re-elected unless he opts to retire from the Dáil. The election was held in 40 parliamentary constituencies. Each multi-member constituency elects three, four or five Teachtaí Dála (Dáil deputies, lit. Assembly Deputies).

The closing date for nominations was 11 February 2016. A total of 551 candidates contested the election, slightly down from the 566 that took part in the 2011 general election, a record figure. The number of candidates for each party was: Fine Gael (88), Fianna Fáil (71), Sinn Féin (50), Green Party (40), Labour Party (36), Anti-Austerity Alliance–People Before Profit (31, of which 18 People Before Profit Alliance and 13 Anti-Austerity Alliance), Renua (26), Direct Democracy Ireland (19), Social Democrats (14), Independents 4 Change (5), Workers' Party (5), Catholic Democrats (3), Fís Nua (2), Irish Democratic Party (1), Communist Party of Ireland (1). Among the 159 independent candidates and others running without a party platform were 21 independents affiliated to the Independent Alliance, 19 independents affiliated to Right2Change, and the outgoing TD Séamus Healy, who was nominated as a non-party candidate for this election. Voting took place between 07:00 and 22:00 (WET).

Islands off the coast of Counties Donegal, Mayo, and Galway voted one day earlier. All resident Irish and British citizens were eligible to be on the Dáil electoral register. The 2016–17 register was published on 1 February by the local authorities, who were responsible for maintaining it. Applications for the supplementary register for the general election closed on 9 February, with 30,185 names added.

== Retiring incumbents ==
The following members of the 31st Dáil announced in advance of the poll that they would not be seeking re-election:

Constituency	Departing TD	Party
Cork East	Sandra McLellan	Sinn Féin
Donegal South-West	Dinny McGinley	Fine Gael
Dublin Mid-West	Robert Dowds	Labour
Dublin North-East	Seán Kenny	Labour
Dublin South	Olivia Mitchell	Fine Gael
Dublin South-Central	Michael Conaghan	Labour
Dublin South-East	Ruairi Quinn	Labour
Dublin South-West	Pat Rabbitte	Labour
Dublin West	Joe Higgins	Socialist Party
Dún Laoghaire	Eamon Gilmore	Labour
Galway East	Michael P. Kitt	Fianna Fáil
Galway West	Brian Walsh	Fine Gael
Kerry South	Tom Fleming	Independent
Kildare South	Jack Wall	Labour
Limerick	Dan Neville	Fine Gael
Louth	Séamus Kirk	Fianna Fáil
Roscommon–South Leitrim	Frank Feighan	Fine Gael
Sligo–North Leitrim	Michael Colreavy	Sinn Féin
Wexford	John Browne	Fianna Fáil
Wexford	Liam Twomey	Fine Gael

== Campaign ==
Election posters in Cork South-Central

The campaign officially began after the dissolution of Dáil Éireann on 3 February 2016 and lasted until polling day on 26 February 2016. During the campaign, official election posters are permitted in locations which would otherwise constitute litter; some candidates were reported to have illegally erected posters too soon. The Broadcasting Authority of Ireland's moratorium on election coverage lasted from 14:00 on 25 February 2016 until polls had closed.

=== Party manifestos and slogans ===
Party/group	Manifesto (external link)	Other slogan(s)
Fine Gael	Let's Keep the Recovery Going	"Your hard work is working"
Fianna Fáil	An Ireland for All	
Sinn Féin	Better with Sinn Féin	
Labour Party	Standing Up for Ireland's Future	"Standing up for working families"
AAA–PBP (combined)	Common Principles: Radical Alternatives and Real Equality (Note: AAA–PBP issued a joint "statement of common principles"; each of its two components issued a separate manifesto)	"A voice for people power, share the wealth"
(AAA)	Real Change not Spare Change	
(PBP)	Share the Wealth: An Alternative Vision for Ireland	
Social Democrats	Building a Better Future 2016–2026	
Green Party	Think Ahead, Act Now	
Independent Alliance	Charter for Government 2016	
Renua	Rewarding Work Rebuilding Trust	
Direct Democracy Ireland	Returning the power to you	
Workers' Party	Take a Step in a New Direction	

=== Television debates ===
RTÉ set a minimum of three TDs for a party to be invited to its 15 February debate. The Green Party, which had no TDs (having lost them all in 2011), took an unsuccessful High Court case against the exclusion of its leader Eamon Ryan. An Irish language debate, moderated by Eimear Ní Chonaola was to be broadcast on TG4 on 17 February, but was cancelled due to the weak proficiency in that language of Adams and Burton. Aodhán Ó Ríordáin (Labour) and Pearse Doherty (Sinn Féin) were suggested as fluent replacements, but Fianna Fáil and Fine Gael insisted that a leaders' debate should be confined to party leaders only. TG4 instead broadcast successive one-to-one interviews with each party's representative. There was also a "live audience discussion" on RTÉ Two on 21 February featuring Timmy Dooley (FF), Mary Lou McDonald (SF), Aodhán Ó Ríordáin (Labour), Averil Power (non-party), Eamon Ryan (Greens), Leo Varadkar (FG), and Adrienne Wallace (AAA-PBP). The discussion was hosted by Keelin Shanley at Facebook's Dublin office and featured questions submitted via Facebook and Twitter. There was some controversy surrounding this debate as a representative of special needs parents said she was to appear to ask a question on waiting lists only to be told by RTÉ later that the topic would not be covered.

2016 Irish general election debates
Date	Broadcaster	Moderator(s)	Participants — Name Participant N Party not invited							Notes
Date	Broadcaster	Moderator(s)	AAA–PBP	Fianna Fáil	Fine Gael	Labour	Renua	Sinn Féin	Social Democrats	Notes
8 February	RTÉ	Claire Byrne	N	McGrath	Noonan	Howlin	N	Doherty	N	Finance spokespersons. 50 minutes.
11 February	TV3	Colette Fitzpatrick; Pat Kenny	N	Martin	Kenny	Burton	N	Adams	N	Party leaders. 80 minutes.
15 February	RTÉ	Claire Byrne	Boyd Barrett	Martin	Kenny	Burton	Creighton	Adams	Donnelly	Party leaders. (Note: The Social Democrats were represented by one of their three TDs, who are interim co-leaders. The AAA–PBP have no leader and nominated Richard Boyd Barrett of PBP, one of their four TDs.) 115 minutes.
15 February	TV3	Mick Clifford	N	Cowen	Reilly	Kelly	N	McDonald	N	Deputy leaders. (Note: Fianna Fáil have had no deputy leader since Éamon Ó Cuív resigned the post in 2012. The party nominated Barry Cowen for the deputy leaders' debate.) 60 minutes.
17 February	TG4	Eimear Ní Chonaola	Cancelled							Planned leaders debate in Irish
22 February	RTÉ	Claire Byrne	N	Kelleher	Varadkar	Lynch	N	Ó Caoláin	N	Health spokespersons. (Note: Non-party candidate Denis Naughten was also included as a participant.) 60 minutes.
23 February	RTÉ	Miriam O'Callaghan	N	Martin	Kenny	Burton	N	Adams	N	Party leaders. 85 minutes.

== Opinion polls ==
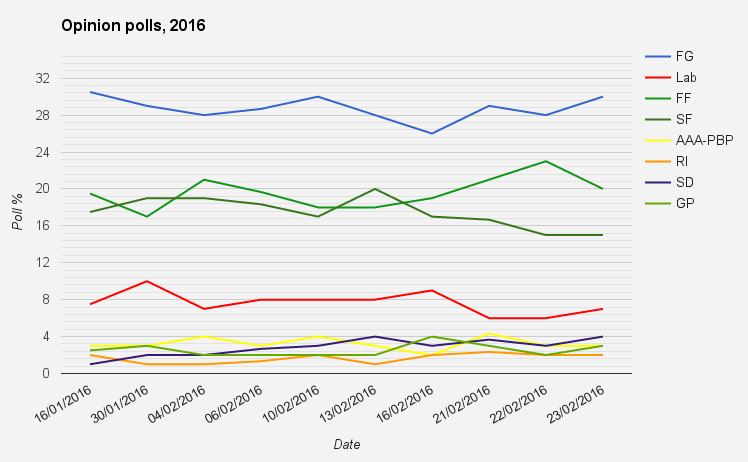
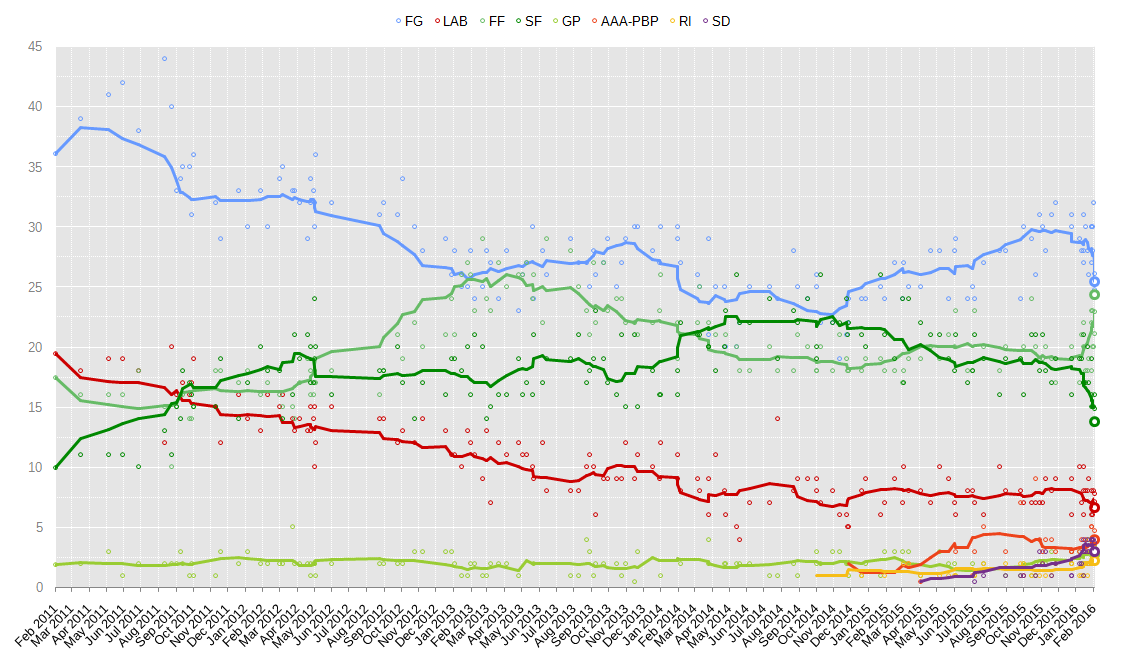

== Results ==
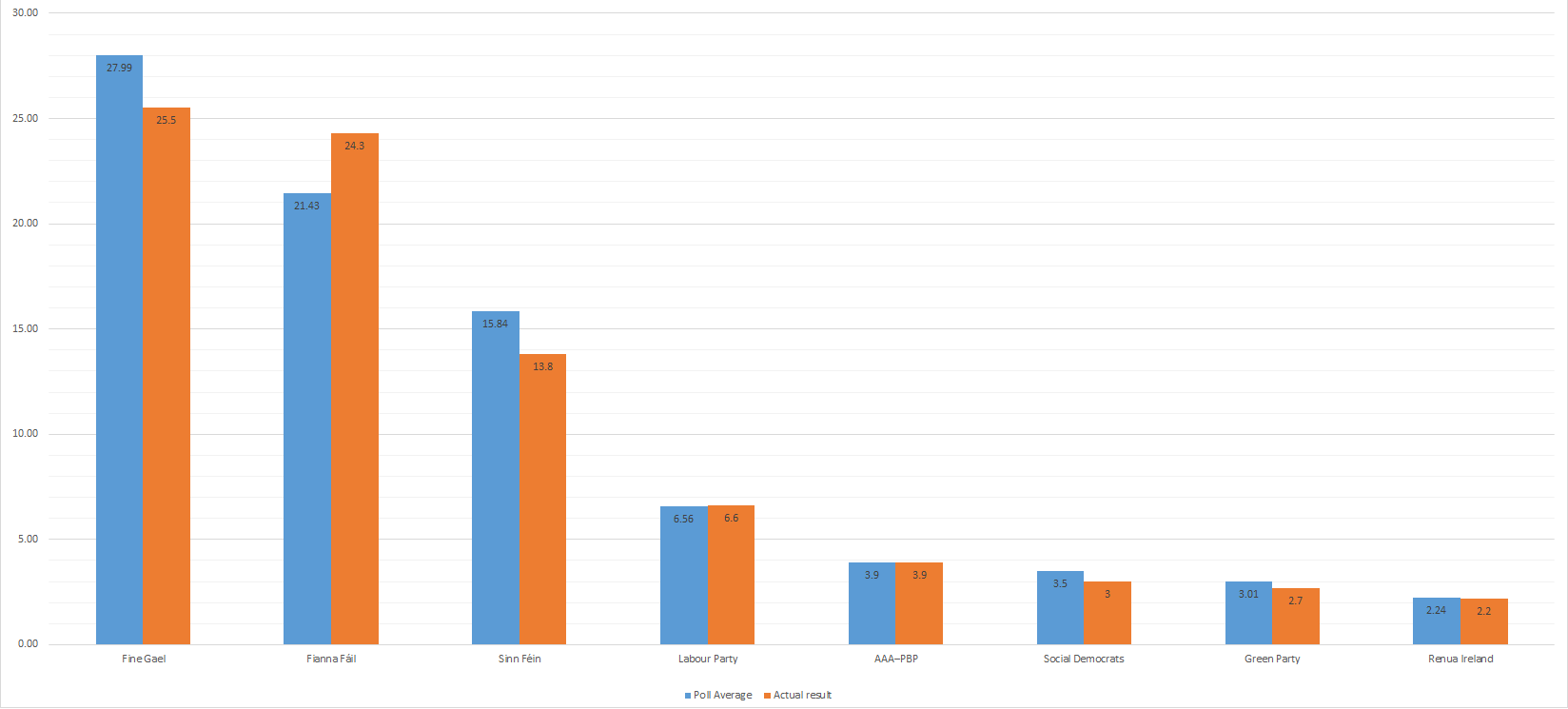
Polling results for the 2016 Irish general election, compared to the actual result

The party that received the most 1st preference votes (for all their candidates) in each constituency.

Counting of votes began at 09:00 UTC on Saturday 27 February 2016 and continued over the course of the weekend and into the following week, with the final two seats, in Longford–Westmeath, announced after multiple recounts at 05:30 UTC on Thursday 3 March.

It was Fine Gael's lowest number of seats since the 2002 general election, the election that led to Kenny becoming leader (the outgoing finance minister in 2016, Michael Noonan, had been Fine Gael's leader in 2002.) They performed especially poorly outside Dublin, dropping from 59 seats to 36; in Dublin the party fared better, going from 17 to 14 for a net loss of only three. Indeed, Fine Gael became the largest party in the capital for the first time since November 1982, and won seats in every constituency in Dublin for the first time since 1987. Fianna Fáil more than doubled the number of seats that they had coming into the election. Having been without representation in Dublin since the death of Brian Lenihan in 2011, Fianna Fáil managed to win six seats in the capital this time. Sinn Féin recorded their strongest showing under Adams to become the third party, making gains in Leinster and in urban areas of Munster, mostly at the expense of the Labour Party. Labour won their lowest vote share since 1987, and their lowest share of seats ever. Despite speculation that she would lose her seat, Joan Burton became the first sitting Tánaiste to avoid defeat at a general election since Mary Harney in 2002. Labour's vote collapse meant that not until the Longford–Westmeath result did they reach the seven-seat threshold to qualify as a parliamentary group with full speaking rights under current Dáil rules.

The combined vote of 49.8 per cent for Fine Gael and Fianna Fáil was a record low for the two largest parties in the Dáil, eclipsing the previous record of 53.6 per cent set by Cumann na nGaedheal and Fianna Fáil in June 1927. It was the first time the vote for Ireland's two traditionally dominant parties had fallen below 50 per cent in a general election. Fine Gael became the largest party in the Dáil with just 25.5 per cent of the vote, the lowest percentage ever for a first party.

Party	Fine Gael	Fianna Fáil	Sinn Féin	Labour	AAA–PBP	I4C	Social Democrats	Green
Leader	Enda Kenny	Micheál Martin	Gerry Adams	Joan Burton	None	None	Stephen Donnelly; Catherine Murphy; Róisín Shortall	Eamon Ryan
Votes, 1st pref.	25.5% 544,230	24.3% 519,353	13.8% 295,313	6.6% 140,893	3.9% 84,168	1.5% 31,365	3.0% 64,094	2.7% 57,997
Seats	50 (31.5%)	44 (28%)	23 (14.5%)	7 (4.5%)	6 (4%)	4 (2.5%)	3 (2%)	2 (1%)

↓
50	44	23	19 (Note: The 19 seats for independents includes 6 seats for politicians participating in the Independent Alliance, which is not a political party, and 13 seats for other independents, but not the 4 seats for Independents 4 Change, which is a registered political party.)	7	6	4	3	2
Fine Gael	Fianna Fáil	Sinn Féin	Inds	Lab	AAA PBP

First preference vote share of different parties in the election.
1. Fine Gael (25.5%)
2. Fianna Fáil (24.3%)
3. Sinn Féin (13.8%)
4. Labour Party (6.60%)
5. AAA–PBP (3.90%)
6. Social Democrats (3.00%)
7. Green Party (2.70%)
8. Renua (2.20%)
9. Independents 4 Change (1.50%)
10. Other (16.5%)

Election to the 32nd Dáil – 26 February 2016
Party	Leader	First Preference Votes			Seats					
Party	Leader	Votes	% FPv	Swing%	Candidates	Elected 2011	Outgoing (Note: TDs in the party at the 2016 dissolution of the 31st Dáil)	Elected 2016	Change (Note: Change in number of seats from the 2011 election to the 2016 election)	% of seats
Fine Gael	Enda Kenny	544,230	25.5	▼10.6	88	76	67	50 / 158 (32%)	▼26	31.6
Fianna Fáil	Micheál Martin	519,353	24.3	▲6.9	71	20	21	44 / 158 (28%)	▲25	27.8
Sinn Féin	Gerry Adams	295,313	13.8	▲3.9	50	14	14	23 / 158 (15%)	▲9	14.6
Labour	Joan Burton	140,893	6.6	▼12.8	36	37	33	7 / 158 (4%)	▼30	4.4
AAA–PBP •People Before Profit Alliance •Anti-Austerity Alliance	None	84,168 42,174; 41,994	3.9 2.0; 1.9	▲1.7 ▲1.0 new	31 18; 13	4 2 new	4	6 / 158 (4%) 3 / 158 (2%); 3 / 158 (2%)	▲2 ▲1 new	3.8 1.9; 1.9
Social Democrats	Catherine Murphy; Róisín Shortall; Stephen Donnelly	64,094	3.0	▲3.0 (Note: This is a new party or group, created after the 2011 general election, so all its votes are counted as a gain.)	14	N/A (Note: Party was founded after the 2011 election)	3	3 / 158 (2%)	▲3	1.9
Green	Eamon Ryan	57,997	2.7	▲0.9	40	0	0	2 / 158 (1%)	▲2	1.3
Renua	Lucinda Creighton	46,552	2.2	▲2.2	26	N/A	3	0	0	0
Inds. 4 Change (Note: Data for 2016 under "Independents" excludes both Independents 4 Change, which was a registered party, and the Independent Alliance and Identity Ireland, which were not. Most members of all these groups were classified as "Independents" in 2011.)	None	31,365	1.5	▲1.5	5	N/A	4	4 / 158 (3%)	▲4	2.5
Direct Democracy	Pat Greene	6,481	0.3	▲0.3	19	N/A	0	0	0	0
Workers' Party	Michael Donnelly	3,242	0.2	▲<0.05 (Note: The Workers' Party got 3,056 votes in 2011 (out of a total vote of 2,220,359).)	5	0	0	0	0	0
Catholic Democrats	Nora Bennis	2,013	0.1	▲0.1 (Note: Although not a new party (though a party with a new name since 2012), the Catholic Democrats fielded no candidates in 2011, so all their votes are counted as a gain. A different party, the Christian Solidarity Party, which was removed from the official register of political parties in 2014, got 2,102 votes in 2011 (out of a total vote of 2,220,359).)	3	0	0	0	0	0
Fís Nua	None	1,224	0.1	▲<0.05 (Note: Fís Nua got 938 votes in 2011 (out of a total vote of 2,220,359).)	2	0	0	0	0	0
Irish Democratic	Ken Smollen	971	<0.05	▲<0.05	1	N/A	0	0	0	0
Communist	Eugene McCartan	185	<0.05	▲<0.05 (Note: Although not a new party, the Communist Party of Ireland fielded no candidates in 2011, so all its votes are counted as a gain.)	1	0	0	0	0	0
Identity Ireland	Peter O'Loughlin	183	<0.05	▲<0.05	1	N/A	0	0	0	0
Independent Alliance	None	88,930	4.2	▲4.2	21	N/A	5	6 / 158 (4%)	▲6	3.8
Independent	—	249,285	11.7	▲1.3	136	14	11 (Note: This total includes Séamus Healy, who was elected for Workers and Unemployed Action in 2011, but re-elected as an Independent in 2016.)	13 / 158 (8%)	▼1	8.2
Vacant	—N/a	—N/a	—N/a	—N/a	—N/a	—N/a	1 (Note: One seat was vacant at the dissolution, after the resignation of Brian Walsh for health reasons on 14 January 2016.)	—N/a	—N/a	—N/a
Total		2,151,293	100%	—	552 (Note: Figure of 551 excluding the Ceann Comhairle who is returned automatically.)	166	166	158	▼8	100%
Total Electorate/Turnout: 3,305,110 (65.1%); Spoilt votes: 18,398

=== Voting summary ===
First preference vote
Fine Gael	25.47%
Fianna Fáil	24.31%
Sinn Féin	13.82%
Labour	6.60%
AAA–PBP	3.94%
Social Democrats	3.00%
Green	2.71%
Renua	2.18%
Independents 4 Change	1.47%
Others	0.66%
Independent Alliance	4.16%
Independent	11.67%

=== Seats summary ===
Dáil seats
Fine Gael	31.65%
Fianna Fáil	27.85%
Sinn Féin	14.56%
Labour	4.43%
AAA–PBP	3.80%
Independents 4 Change	2.53%
Social Democrats	1.90%
Green	1.27%
Independent Alliance	3.80%
Independent	8.23%

=== TDs who lost their seats ===
Party	Seats lost	Name	Constituency	Other offices held	Year elected
Fine Gael	21	James Bannon	Longford–Westmeath		2007
Fine Gael	21	Tom Barry	Cork East		2011
Fine Gael	21	Ray Butler	Meath West		2011
Fine Gael	21	Jerry Buttimer	Cork South-Central		2011
Fine Gael	21	Paudie Coffey	Waterford	Minister of State at the Department of the Environment, Community and Local Government	2011
Fine Gael	21	Áine Collins	Cork North-West		2011
Fine Gael	21	Paul Connaughton Jnr	Galway East		2011
Fine Gael	21	Noel Coonan	Tipperary		2007
Fine Gael	21	Jimmy Deenihan	Kerry	Minister of State at the Department of Foreign Affairs	1987
Fine Gael	21	Noel Harrington	Cork South-West		2011
Fine Gael	21	Tom Hayes	Tipperary		2001
Fine Gael	21	Derek Keating	Dublin Mid-West		2011
Fine Gael	21	Anthony Lawlor	Kildare North		2011
Fine Gael	21	Gabrielle McFadden	Longford–Westmeath		2014
Fine Gael	21	Michelle Mulherin	Mayo		2011
Fine Gael	21	Kieran O'Donnell	Limerick City		2007
Fine Gael	21	John O'Mahony	Galway West		2007
Fine Gael	21	Joe O'Reilly	Cavan–Monaghan		2011
Fine Gael	21	John Perry	Sligo–Leitrim		1997
Fine Gael	21	James Reilly	Dublin Fingal	Minister for Children and Youth Affairs	2007
Fine Gael	21	Alan Shatter	Dublin South		1981 (Note: Shatter lost his seat in 2002 but regained it in 2007.)
Labour	19	Eric Byrne	Dublin South-Central		1989 (Note: Byrne lost his seat in 1992 but regained it in 1994, lost it again in 1997 but regained it in 2011.)
Labour	19	Ciara Conway	Waterford		2011
Labour	19	Joe Costello	Dublin Central		1992 (Note: Costello lost his seat in 1997 but regained it in 2002.)
Labour	19	Anne Ferris	Wicklow		2011
Labour	19	Dominic Hannigan	Meath East		2011
Labour	19	Kevin Humphreys	Dublin Bay South	Minister of State for Employment, Community and Social Support	2011
Labour	19	Ciarán Lynch	Cork South-Central		2007
Labour	19	Kathleen Lynch	Cork North-Central	Minister of State for Primary Care, Mental Health and Disability	1994 (Note: Lynch lost her seat in 1997 but regained it in 2002.)
Labour	19	John Lyons	Dublin North-West		2011
Labour	19	Michael McCarthy	Cork South-West		2011
Labour	19	Michael McNamara	Clare		2011
Labour	19	Ged Nash	Louth	Minister of State for Business and Employment	2011
Labour	19	Derek Nolan	Galway West		2011
Labour	19	Aodhán Ó Ríordáin	Dublin Bay North	Minister of State for New Communities, Culture and Equality	2011
Labour	19	Ann Phelan	Carlow–Kilkenny		2011
Labour	19	Arthur Spring	Kerry		2011
Labour	19	Emmet Stagg	Kildare North		1987
Labour	19	Joanna Tuffy	Dublin Mid-West		2007
Labour	19	Alex White	Dublin Rathdown	Minister for Communications, Energy and Natural Resources	2011
Renua	3	Lucinda Creighton	Dublin Bay South		2007 (Note: Creighton was elected as Fine Gael.)
Renua	3	Terence Flanagan	Dublin Bay North		2007 (Note: Flanagan was elected as Fine Gael.)
Renua	3	Billy Timmins	Wicklow		1997 (Note: Timmins was elected as Fine Gael.)
Fianna Fáil	1	Colm Keaveney	Galway East		2011
Sinn Féin	1	Pádraig Mac Lochlainn	Donegal		2011
Independent	3	Seán Conlan	Cavan–Monaghan		2011 (Note: Conlan was elected as Fine Gael.)
Independent	3	Eamonn Maloney	Dublin South-West		2011 (Note: Maloney was elected as Labour.)
Independent	3	Peter Mathews	Dublin Rathdown		2011 (Note: Mathews was elected as Fine Gael.)
Total	48	—	—	—	—

== Government formation ==
Enda Kenny immediately conceded that the outgoing coalition government of Fine Gael and Labour would be unable to continue. Fine Gael was 29 seats short of a majority, leading to speculation of a possibility of a grand coalition between Fine Gael and Fianna Fáil, of a minority government, or of another general election later in 2016. Talks to form a government got underway in March.

On 29 April, after 63 days of negotiation and three failed votes for Taoiseach, Fine Gael and Fianna Fáil reached an agreement about a Fine Gael minority government. In the days following, Fine Gael negotiated a deal with Independent TDs on the formation of a minority coalition. Enda Kenny was re-elected Taoiseach on 6 May 2016.

== Seanad election ==
The Dáil election was followed by the election to the 25th Seanad.

== Notes, citations and sources ==
=== Further reading ===
- Barrett, David (2016). "Irish general election 2016 report: whither the party system?". Irish Political Studies. 31 (3): 418–431. doi:10.1080/07907184.2016.1195814. S2CID 157878313.
- Culloty, Eileen, and Jane Suiter. "Journalism Norms and the Absence of Media Populism in the Irish General Election 2016." in Mediated Campaigns and Populism in Europe (Palgrave Macmillan, Cham, 2019) pp. 51–74.
- Kusche, Isabel (2017). "Constituency orientation in Irish politics: video statements of the candidates in the Irish general election 2016". Irish Political Studies. 32 (3): 498–520. doi:10.1080/07907184.2017.1325362. S2CID 148869328.
- Little, Conor (2017). "The Irish general election of February 2016: towards a new politics or an early election?" (PDF). West European Politics. 40 (2): 479–488. doi:10.1080/01402382.2016.1216507. S2CID 158008268.

=== External links ===
- Election 2016 news coverage at Raidió Teilifís Éireann
- Election 2016 news coverage at The Irish Times
- Election 2016 news coverage at the Irish Independent
