= Peter Burke (politician) =

Irish politician (born 1982)

Peter Burke TD
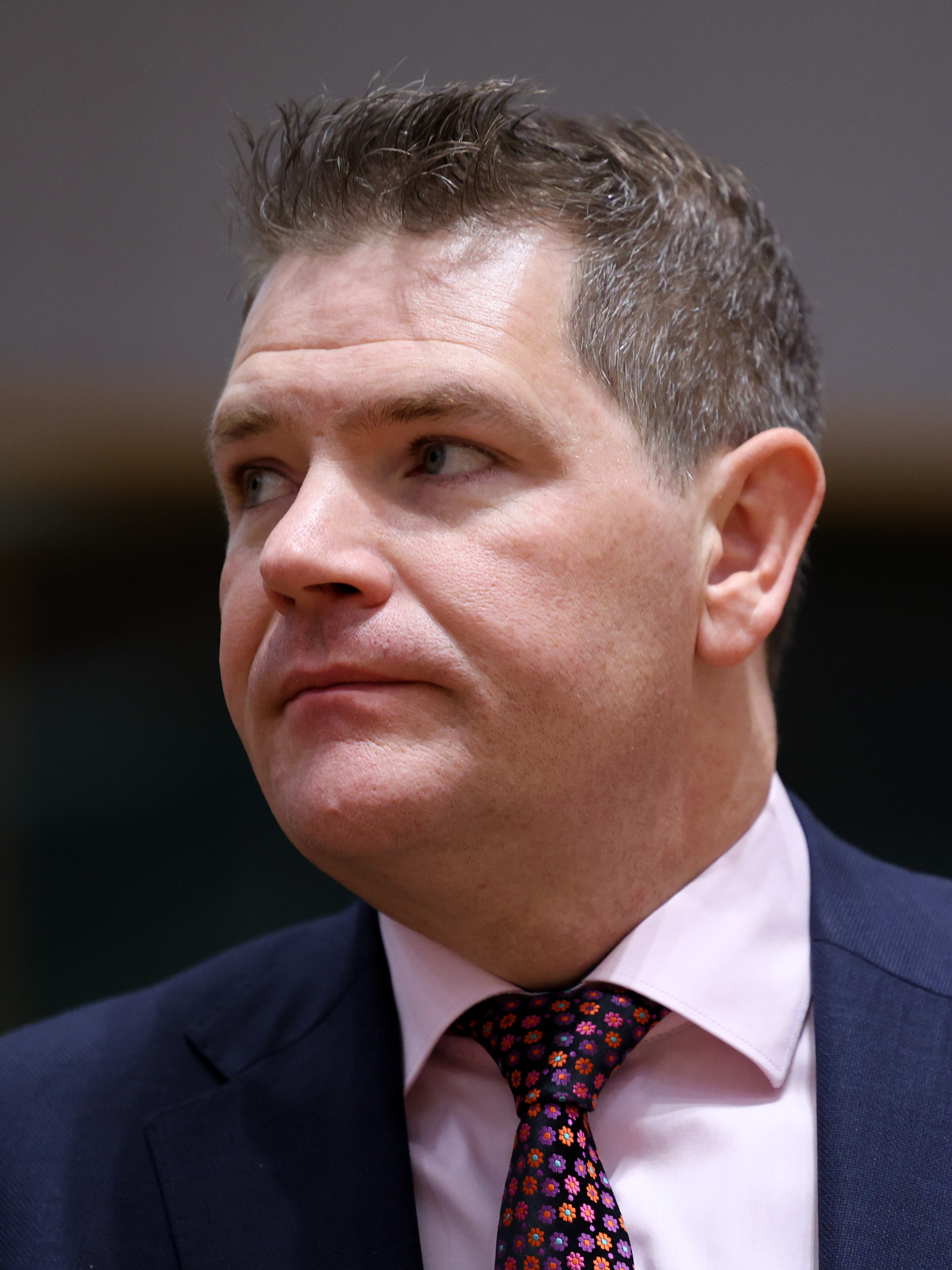
- Burke in 2025

Minister for Enterprise, Tourism and Employment
- Incumbent
- Assumed office 9 April 2024
- Taoiseach: Simon Harris; Micheál Martin
- Preceded by: Simon Coveney

Minister for Culture, Communications and Sport
- Incumbent
- Assumed office 2 November 2026
- Taoiseach: Micheál Martin
- Preceded by: Patrick O'Donovan

Minister of State
- 2022–2024: European Affairs
- 2022–2024: Defence
- 2020–2022: Housing, Local Government and Heritage

Teachta Dála
- Incumbent
- Assumed office February 2016
- Constituency: Longford–Westmeath

Personal details
- Born: 22 October 1982 (age 44) Mullingar, County Westmeath, Ireland
- Party: Fine Gael
- Spouse: Olivia Burke (m. 2015)
- Children: 2
- Education: NUI Galway
- Website: Fine Gael website

Peter Burke (born 22 October 1982) is an Irish Fine Gael politician who has served as Minister for Enterprise, Tourism and Employment since 2025, and as Minister for Culture, Communications and Sport since 2026. He previously served as Minister for Enterprise, Trade and Employment from 2024 to 2025. He served in various junior ministries from 2020 to 2024. He has been a Teachta Dála (TD) for Longford–Westmeath since 2016.

== Political career ==
He was a member of Westmeath County Council from 2009 to 2016. He lives in Mullingar with his wife and two children.

He was first elected to the Dáil for Longford–Westmeath at the 2016 general election. Burke was a frequent media commentator during the 32nd Dáil on issues including finance and taxation, drawing from his private sector experience as a chartered accountant.

He supported Leo Varadkar during the 2017 Fine Gael leadership election. During the campaign, he stated that there were "two strong candidates in the race, and I know that neither will let the competition become divisive for the party or the country".

On 1 July 2020, a Fianna Fáil–Fine Gael–Green Party coalition was formed with a rotation agreement between the two main party leaders. When Micheál Martin as Taoiseach formed the 32nd government of Ireland, Burke was appointed as a Minister of State at the Department of Housing, Local Government and Heritage with responsibility for local government and planning. In December 2022, following the appointment of Leo Varadkar as Taoiseach, he was appointed as Minister of State for European Affairs and Minister of State at the Department of Defence.

On 9 April 2024, Burke was appointed as Minister for Enterprise, Trade and Employment following the appointment of Simon Harris as Taoiseach. On 23 January 2025, he was appointed as Minister for Enterprise, Tourism and Employment in the government led by Micheál Martin, following the 2024 general election. On 2 November, he was appointed the additional portfolio of Minister for Culture, Communications and Sport on a temporary during a period of recovery from hospitalisation of Patrick O'Donovan.

Political offices
Preceded by John Paul Phelan; Damien English as Minister of State at the Department of Housing, Planning and Local Government	Minister of State at the Department of Housing, Local Government and Heritage; 2020–2022; With: Malcolm Noonan	Succeeded by Kieran O'Donnell
Preceded by Jack Chambers	Minister of State at the Department of Defence; 2022–2024	Succeeded by Jennifer Carroll MacNeill
Preceded by Thomas Byrne	Minister of State for European Affairs; 2022–2024	Succeeded by Jennifer Carroll MacNeill
Preceded by Simon Coveney as Minister for Enterprise, Trade and Employment	Minister for Enterprise, Tourism and Employment; 2024–present	Incumbent
Preceded by Patrick O'Donovan	Minister for Culture, Communications and Sport; 2024–present	Incumbent

Dáil	Election	Deputy (Party)	Deputy (Party)	Deputy (Party)	Deputy (Party)	Deputy (Party)
2nd	1921	Lorcan Robbins (SF)	Seán Mac Eoin (SF)	Joseph McGuinness (SF)	Laurence Ginnell (SF)	4 seats 1921–1923
3rd	1922	John Lyons (Lab)	Seán Mac Eoin (PT-SF)	Francis McGuinness (PT-SF)	Laurence Ginnell (AT-SF)	4 seats 1921–1923
4th	1923	John Lyons (Ind.)	Conor Byrne (Rep)	James Killane (Rep)	Patrick Shaw (CnaG)	Patrick McKenna (FP)
5th	1927 (Jun)	Henry Broderick (Lab)	Michael Kennedy (FF)	James Victory (FF)	Patrick Shaw (CnaG)	Hugh Garahan (FP)
6th	1927 (Sep)	Henry Broderick (Lab)	Michael Kennedy (FF)	James Killane (FF)	Patrick Shaw (CnaG)	Michael Connolly (CnaG)
6th	1930 by-election	Henry Broderick (Lab)	Michael Kennedy (FF)	James Geoghegan (FF)	Patrick Shaw (CnaG)	Michael Connolly (CnaG)
7th	1932	Francis Gormley (FF)	Michael Kennedy (FF)	James Geoghegan (FF)	Patrick Shaw (CnaG)	Seán Mac Eoin (CnaG)
8th	1933	James Victory (FF)	Michael Kennedy (FF)	James Geoghegan (FF)	Charles Fagan (NCP)	Seán Mac Eoin (CnaG)
9th	1937	Constituency abolished. See Athlone–Longford and Meath–Westmeath				

Dáil	Election	Deputy (Party)	Deputy (Party)	Deputy (Party)	Deputy (Party)	Deputy (Party)
13th	1948	Erskine H. Childers (FF)	Thomas Carter (FF)	Michael Kennedy (FF)	Seán Mac Eoin (FG)	Charles Fagan (Ind.)
14th	1951	Erskine H. Childers (FF)	Frank Carter (FF)	Michael Kennedy (FF)	Seán Mac Eoin (FG)	Charles Fagan (Ind.)
15th	1954	Erskine H. Childers (FF)	Frank Carter (FF)	Michael Kennedy (FF)	Seán Mac Eoin (FG)	Charles Fagan (FG)
16th	1957	Erskine H. Childers (FF)	Ruairí Ó Brádaigh (SF)	Michael Kennedy (FF)	Seán Mac Eoin (FG)	Charles Fagan (FG)
17th	1961	Frank Carter (FF)	Joe Sheridan (Ind.)	Michael Kennedy (FF)	Seán Mac Eoin (FG)	4 seats 1961–1992
18th	1965	Frank Carter (FF)	Joe Sheridan (Ind.)	Patrick Lenihan (FF)	Gerry L'Estrange (FG)	4 seats 1961–1992
19th	1969	Frank Carter (FF)	Joe Sheridan (Ind.)	Patrick Lenihan (FF)	Gerry L'Estrange (FG)	4 seats 1961–1992
19th	1970 by-election	Frank Carter (FF)	Joe Sheridan (Ind.)	Patrick Cooney (FG)	Gerry L'Estrange (FG)	4 seats 1961–1992
20th	1973	Frank Carter (FF)	Joe Sheridan (Ind.)	Patrick Cooney (FG)	Gerry L'Estrange (FG)	4 seats 1961–1992
21st	1977	Albert Reynolds (FF)	Joe Sheridan (Ind.)	Seán Keegan (FF)	Gerry L'Estrange (FG)	4 seats 1961–1992
22nd	1981	Albert Reynolds (FF)	Patrick Cooney (FG)	Seán Keegan (FF)	Gerry L'Estrange (FG)	4 seats 1961–1992
23rd	1982 (Feb)	Albert Reynolds (FF)	Patrick Cooney (FG)	Seán Keegan (FF)	Gerry L'Estrange (FG)	4 seats 1961–1992
24th	1982 (Nov)	Albert Reynolds (FF)	Patrick Cooney (FG)	Mary O'Rourke (FF)	Gerry L'Estrange (FG)	4 seats 1961–1992
25th	1987	Albert Reynolds (FF)	Patrick Cooney (FG)	Mary O'Rourke (FF)	Henry Abbott (FF)	4 seats 1961–1992
26th	1989	Albert Reynolds (FF)	Louis Belton (FG)	Mary O'Rourke (FF)	Paul McGrath (FG)	4 seats 1961–1992
27th	1992	Constituency abolished. See Longford–Roscommon and Westmeath				

Dáil	Election	Deputy (Party)	Deputy (Party)	Deputy (Party)	Deputy (Party)	Deputy (Party)
30th	2007	Willie Penrose (Lab)	Peter Kelly (FF)	Mary O'Rourke (FF)	James Bannon (FG)	4 seats 2007–2024
31st	2011	Willie Penrose (Lab)	Robert Troy (FF)	Nicky McFadden (FG)	James Bannon (FG)	4 seats 2007–2024
31st	2014 by-election	Willie Penrose (Lab)	Robert Troy (FF)	Gabrielle McFadden (FG)	James Bannon (FG)	4 seats 2007–2024
32nd	2016	Willie Penrose (Lab)	Robert Troy (FF)	Kevin "Boxer" Moran (Ind.)	Peter Burke (FG)	4 seats 2007–2024
33rd	2020	Sorca Clarke (SF)	Robert Troy (FF)	Joe Flaherty (FF)	Peter Burke (FG)	4 seats 2007–2024
34th	2024	Sorca Clarke (SF)	Robert Troy (FF)	Kevin "Boxer" Moran (Ind.)	Peter Burke (FG)	Micheál Carrigy (FG)
