= Charles Flanagan =

Irish former politician (born 1956)

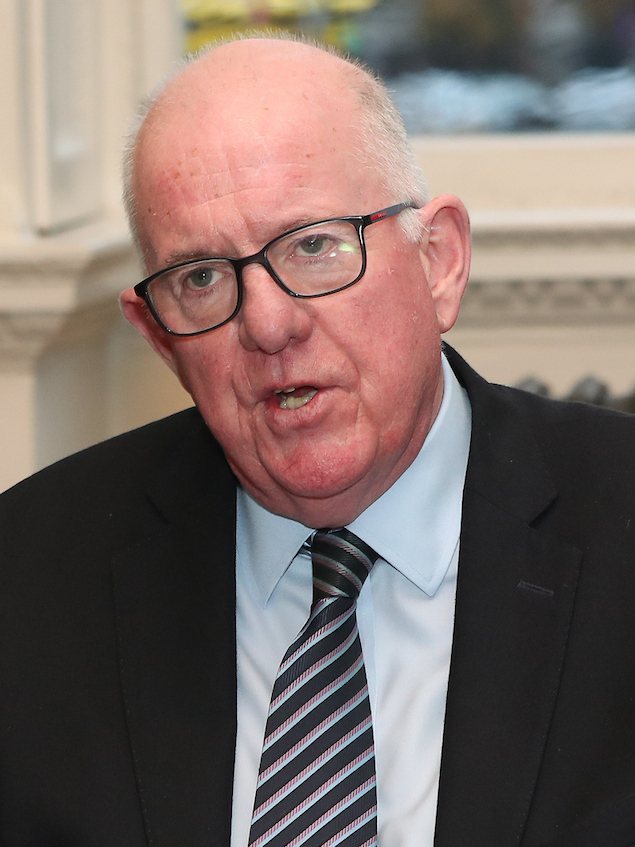
- Flanagan in 2022

Chair of the Committee on Foreign Affairs and Defence
- In office 15 September 2020 – 8 November 2024
- Preceded by: Brendan Smith

Minister for Justice and Equality
- In office 14 June 2017 – 27 June 2020
- Taoiseach: Leo Varadkar
- Preceded by: Frances Fitzgerald
- Succeeded by: Helen McEntee (Justice); Roderic O'Gorman (Equality)

Minister for Foreign Affairs and Trade
- In office 11 July 2014 – 14 June 2017
- Taoiseach: Enda Kenny
- Preceded by: Eamon Gilmore
- Succeeded by: Simon Coveney

Minister for Children and Youth Affairs
- In office 8 May 2014 – 11 July 2014
- Taoiseach: Enda Kenny
- Preceded by: Frances Fitzgerald
- Succeeded by: James Reilly

Chair of the Fine Gael parliamentary party
- In office 9 March 2011 – 8 May 2014
- Leader: Enda Kenny
- Preceded by: Pádraic McCormack
- Succeeded by: Dan Neville

Teachta Dála
- In office February 2020 – November 2024
- In office May 2007 – February 2016
- In office February 1987 – May 2002
- Constituency: Laois–Offaly
- In office February 2016 – February 2020
- Constituency: Laois

Personal details
- Born: 1 November 1956 (age 69) Mountmellick, County Laois, Ireland
- Party: Fine Gael
- Spouse: Mary Flanagan (m. 1994)
- Children: 2
- Parent: Oliver J. Flanagan (father)
- Education: University College Dublin

Charles Flanagan (born 1 November 1956) is an Irish former Fine Gael politician who served as Minister for Justice and Equality from 2017 to 2020, Chair of the Committee on Foreign Affairs and Defence from 2020 to 2024, Minister for Foreign Affairs and Trade from 2014 to 2017, Minister for Children and Youth Affairs from May to July 2014 and Chair of the Fine Gael parliamentary party from 2011 to 2014. He was a Teachta Dála (TD) for Laois–Offaly from 2020 to 2024, and previously from 1987 to 2002, 2007 to 2016 and from 2016 to 2020 for the Laois constituency.

== Early life ==
Flanagan was born in 1956 in Mountmellick, County Laois. His father was Oliver J. Flanagan, an Irish Fine Gael politician who served as Minister for Defence from 1976 to 1977. He attended Knockbeg College at a secondary level and studied at University College Dublin and the Law Society of Ireland, where he qualified as a solicitor.

== Career ==
Flanagan was first elected to Dáil Éireann at the 1987 general election, succeeding his father. Following his father's death in 1987, he was co-opted onto his seat on Laois County Council. He served until the abolition of the dual mandate in 2004.

He retained his seat at each election until losing it at the 2002 general election but regained it at the 2007 general election. He was party spokesperson on Justice, Equality and Law Reform from 2007 to 2010, and was the party Spokesperson on Children from 2010 to 2011.

He was Chair of the Fine Gael parliamentary party from June 2011 to May 2014.

On 7 May 2014, following the resignation of Alan Shatter as Minister for Justice and Minister for Defence, Flanagan was appointed the following day as Minister for Children and Youth Affairs to succeed Frances Fitzgerald, who assumed the Justice portfolio. On 11 July 2014, Flanagan was appointed as Minister for Foreign Affairs and Trade, succeeding the former Labour leader Eamon Gilmore.

He supported Leo Varadkar in the 2017 Fine Gael leadership election, and upon Varadkar's appointment as Taoiseach on 14 June 2017, Flanagan was appointed as Minister for Justice and Equality. Flanagan was replaced as Minister for Justice by Helen McEntee on the formation of a new government with Micheál Martin as Taoiseach on 27 June 2020.

Flanagan had previously said he intended to contest the next general election, but on 25 September 2023, he announced that he would not run, citing the split of Laois–Offaly constituency into two constituencies.

=== RIC commemoration ===
As Minister for Justice in 2020, Flanagan was behind plans for a state commemoration of the Royal Irish Constabulary (RIC), the police force in Ireland during British administration. This drew widespread criticism from politicians and the public, largely due to the RIC's role in suppressing Irish independence movements, and atrocities by the Black and Tans during the War of Independence. A member of the government-appointed advisory group said they had "recommended a simple ceremony in Dublin Castle, but somebody lost the run of themselves and called it a State event". The backlash forced Flanagan to defer the commemoration, but he committed to holding another in future.

Flanagan supported a memorial wall in Glasnevin Cemetery that drew controversy for commemorating British soldiers alongside Irish revolutionaries. He condemned the decision to take down the wall as a "victory for bullies". Flanagan has also defended his wearing of the remembrance poppy, a historically controversial emblem in Ireland, calling it an "international symbol of remembrance".

== Political views ==
In 2009, Flanagan expressed support for legalising adoption for same-sex couples, describing it as a "glaring omission" from a bill signed by Minister for Justice Dermot Ahern. He supported the legalisation of gay marriage in Ireland's 2015 referendum, praising "a new and modern Ireland" and "a great day for tolerance, inclusion [and] pluralism". He campaigned in favour of a Yes vote in the 2018 Irish abortion referendum. In 2018, Flanagan delivered an apology in the Seanad on behalf of the state, to those who suffered as a result of homosexuality being criminalised. In 2019, as Minister for Justice, Flanagan signed an exclusion order banning anti-gay preacher Steven Anderson from entering Ireland.

Flanagan has criticised the Irish press for their coverage of Israel, accusing them of "demonisation" and "slavishly dancing to the Palestinian drumbeat for decades". As Minister for Foreign Affairs, he resisted calls to expel the Israeli ambassador to Ireland, Boaz Moda'i.

== Personal life ==
Flanagan is married and has two daughters.

Party political offices
Preceded by Pádraic McCormack	Chair of the Fine Gael parliamentary party 2011–2014	Succeeded by Dan Neville
Political offices
Preceded by Frances Fitzgerald	Minister for Children and Youth Affairs; 2014	Succeeded by James Reilly
Preceded by Eamon Gilmore	Minister for Foreign Affairs and Trade; 2014–2017	Succeeded by Simon Coveney
Preceded by Frances Fitzgerald	Minister for Justice and Equality; 2017–2020	Succeeded by Helen McEntee

Dáil	Election	Deputy (Party)	Deputy (Party)	Deputy (Party)	Deputy (Party)	Deputy (Party)
2nd	1921	Joseph Lynch (SF)	Patrick McCartan (SF)	Francis Bulfin (SF)	Kevin O'Higgins (SF)	4 seats 1921–1923
3rd	1922	William Davin (Lab)	Patrick McCartan (PT-SF)	Francis Bulfin (PT-SF)	Kevin O'Higgins (PT-SF)	4 seats 1921–1923
4th	1923	William Davin (Lab)	Laurence Brady (Rep)	Francis Bulfin (CnaG)	Patrick Egan (CnaG)	Seán McGuinness (Rep)
4th	1926 by-election	William Davin (Lab)	Laurence Brady (Rep)	Francis Bulfin (CnaG)	Patrick Egan (CnaG)	James Dwyer (CnaG)
5th	1927 (Jun)	William Davin (Lab)	Patrick Boland (FF)	Thomas Tynan (FF)	John Gill (Lab)	James Dwyer (CnaG)
6th	1927 (Sep)	William Davin (Lab)	Patrick Boland (FF)	Patrick Gorry (FF)	William Aird (CnaG)	James Dwyer (CnaG)
7th	1932	William Davin (Lab)	Patrick Boland (FF)	Patrick Gorry (FF)	Thomas F. O'Higgins (CnaG)	Eugene O'Brien (CnaG)
8th	1933	William Davin (Lab)	Patrick Boland (FF)	Eamon Donnelly (FF)	Thomas F. O'Higgins (CnaG)	Jack Finlay (NCP)
9th	1937	William Davin (Lab)	Patrick Boland (FF)	Patrick Gorry (FF)	Thomas F. O'Higgins (FG)	Jack Finlay (FG)
10th	1938	William Davin (Lab)	Patrick Boland (FF)	Patrick Gorry (FF)	Thomas F. O'Higgins (FG)	Daniel Hogan (FF)
11th	1943	William Davin (Lab)	Patrick Boland (FF)	Patrick Gorry (FF)	Thomas F. O'Higgins (FG)	Oliver J. Flanagan (IMR)
12th	1944	William Davin (Lab)	Patrick Boland (FF)	Patrick Gorry (FF)	Thomas F. O'Higgins (FG)	Oliver J. Flanagan (IMR)
13th	1948	William Davin (Lab)	Patrick Boland (FF)	Patrick Gorry (FF)	Tom O'Higgins, Jnr (FG)	Oliver J. Flanagan (Ind.)
14th	1951	William Davin (Lab)	Patrick Boland (FF)	Peadar Maher (FF)	Tom O'Higgins, Jnr (FG)	Oliver J. Flanagan (Ind.)
15th	1954	William Davin (Lab)	Nicholas Egan (FF)	Peadar Maher (FF)	Tom O'Higgins, Jnr (FG)	Oliver J. Flanagan (FG)
15th	1956 by-election	Kieran Egan (FF)	Nicholas Egan (FF)	Peadar Maher (FF)	Tom O'Higgins, Jnr (FG)	Oliver J. Flanagan (FG)
16th	1957	Kieran Egan (FF)	Nicholas Egan (FF)	Peadar Maher (FF)	Tom O'Higgins, Jnr (FG)	Oliver J. Flanagan (FG)
17th	1961	Kieran Egan (FF)	Nicholas Egan (FF)	Patrick Lalor (FF)	Tom O'Higgins, Jnr (FG)	Oliver J. Flanagan (FG)
18th	1965	Henry Byrne (Lab)	Nicholas Egan (FF)	Patrick Lalor (FF)	Tom O'Higgins, Jnr (FG)	Oliver J. Flanagan (FG)
19th	1969	Ger Connolly (FF)	Bernard Cowen (FF)	Patrick Lalor (FF)	Tom Enright (FG)	Oliver J. Flanagan (FG)
20th	1973	Ger Connolly (FF)	Charles McDonald (FG)	Patrick Lalor (FF)	Tom Enright (FG)	Oliver J. Flanagan (FG)
21st	1977	Ger Connolly (FF)	Bernard Cowen (FF)	Patrick Lalor (FF)	Tom Enright (FG)	Oliver J. Flanagan (FG)
22nd	1981	Ger Connolly (FF)	Bernard Cowen (FF)	Liam Hyland (FF)	Tom Enright (FG)	Oliver J. Flanagan (FG)
23rd	1982 (Feb)	Ger Connolly (FF)	Bernard Cowen (FF)	Liam Hyland (FF)	Tom Enright (FG)	Oliver J. Flanagan (FG)
24th	1982 (Nov)	Ger Connolly (FF)	Bernard Cowen (FF)	Liam Hyland (FF)	Tom Enright (FG)	Oliver J. Flanagan (FG)
24th	1984 by-election	Ger Connolly (FF)	Brian Cowen (FF)	Liam Hyland (FF)	Tom Enright (FG)	Oliver J. Flanagan (FG)
25th	1987	Ger Connolly (FF)	Brian Cowen (FF)	Liam Hyland (FF)	Tom Enright (FG)	Charles Flanagan (FG)
26th	1989	Ger Connolly (FF)	Brian Cowen (FF)	Liam Hyland (FF)	Tom Enright (FG)	Charles Flanagan (FG)
27th	1992	Ger Connolly (FF)	Brian Cowen (FF)	Liam Hyland (FF)	Pat Gallagher (Lab)	Charles Flanagan (FG)
28th	1997	John Moloney (FF)	Brian Cowen (FF)	Seán Fleming (FF)	Tom Enright (FG)	Charles Flanagan (FG)
29th	2002	John Moloney (FF)	Brian Cowen (FF)	Seán Fleming (FF)	Olwyn Enright (FG)	Tom Parlon (PDs)
30th	2007	John Moloney (FF)	Brian Cowen (FF)	Seán Fleming (FF)	Olwyn Enright (FG)	Charles Flanagan (FG)
31st	2011	Brian Stanley (SF)	Barry Cowen (FF)	Seán Fleming (FF)	Marcella Corcoran Kennedy (FG)	Charles Flanagan (FG)
32nd	2016	Constituency abolished. See Laois and Offaly.				
33rd	2020	Brian Stanley (SF)	Barry Cowen (FF)	Seán Fleming (FF)	Carol Nolan (Ind.)	Charles Flanagan (FG)
33rd	2024	Brian Stanley (SF)	(Vacant)	Seán Fleming (FF)	Carol Nolan (Ind.)	Charles Flanagan (FG)
34th	2024	Constituency abolished. See Laois and Offaly.				

Dáil	Election	Deputy (Party)	Deputy (Party)	Deputy (Party)
32nd	2016	Brian Stanley (SF)	Seán Fleming (FF)	Charles Flanagan (FG)
33rd	2020	Constituency abolished. See Laois–Offaly.		
34th	2024	Brian Stanley (Ind.)	Seán Fleming (FF)	William Aird (FG)
