= Gurteen College =

Agricultural college in Ireland

Coordinates: 53.0408°N 8.0111°W

Gurteen College is an agricultural college 4.4 km (2.7 mi) from Ballingarry, North Tipperary, Ireland. Founded as Gurteen Agricultural College by the Methodist Church in Ireland in 1947, it was officially opened by the Minister for Agriculture, Patrick Smith, on October 11, 1947. The college provides training courses in agriculture and equine studies for farms and rural enterprises. It is a charity registered in Ireland.

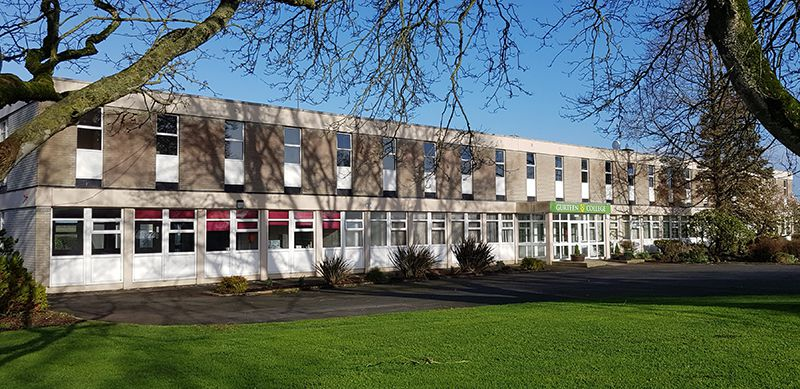
Gurteen Agricultural College, main building

The farm covers 380 ha (940 acres) of land. The farm of the college consists of beef- and dairy-cattle herds, a sheep herd, and tillage. It is both a day and residential college, with rooms for up to 70 students.

== Courses ==
Gurteen College provides a Level 5 Certificate in Agriculture Course, along with Level 6 Advance Certificates in Agriculture in Crops & Machinery Management, Dairy Herd Management, and Drystock Herd Management. The Equine department opened in 1999 and currently runs a Level 5 and 6 in Horsemanship. The TUS Athlone campus offers a Bachelor of Science (Veterinary Nursing), where students spend time completing practical skills on the teaching farm at Gurteen College. Technological University of the Shannon: Midlands Midwest offers an Agricultural Science and Sustainability course at Levels 7 and 8 in conjunction with Gurteen College. The college also provides a distance education course and a part time Green Cert course too, along with regular one-off courses.

== Latest developments ==
Gurteen College students were crowned Annual Colleges Challenge Day Champions on 2 February 2012.

Woodchip boilers were installed to provide heat to the college in September 2010. Groves of willow grown in three year rotations provide fuel for the boilers.

Met Éireann opened an automatic weather station in 2008 within the grounds of the College.

On 26 January 2010 a 50 kW (67 hp) wind turbine was officially commissioned to provide power to the college.

== Past pupils ==
- Simon Coveney, Irish politician and government minister
- Tom Parlon, Irish lobbyist, former president of the Irish Farmers' Association, and a former politician
- Noel Treacy, former Irish politician
- Ivan Yates, Irish businessman, broadcaster, and former politician (he served as Minister of Agriculture)

== Principals ==
Rev. James Wesley McKinney (who went on to have a building within Gurteen named after him - McKinney Hall) was first Principal in 1947 until he retired in 1959, when Rev. R. G. Livingstone became principal. Mr. Oscar H. Loane became principal in 1963 serving until 1988 when John Craig became principal, retiring in 2000. Jon Parry was appointed principal in 2019, the college's sixth principal succeeding Mick Pearson who served as principal for twenty years.
