= Mary Mitchell O'Connor =

Irish former politician (born 1959)

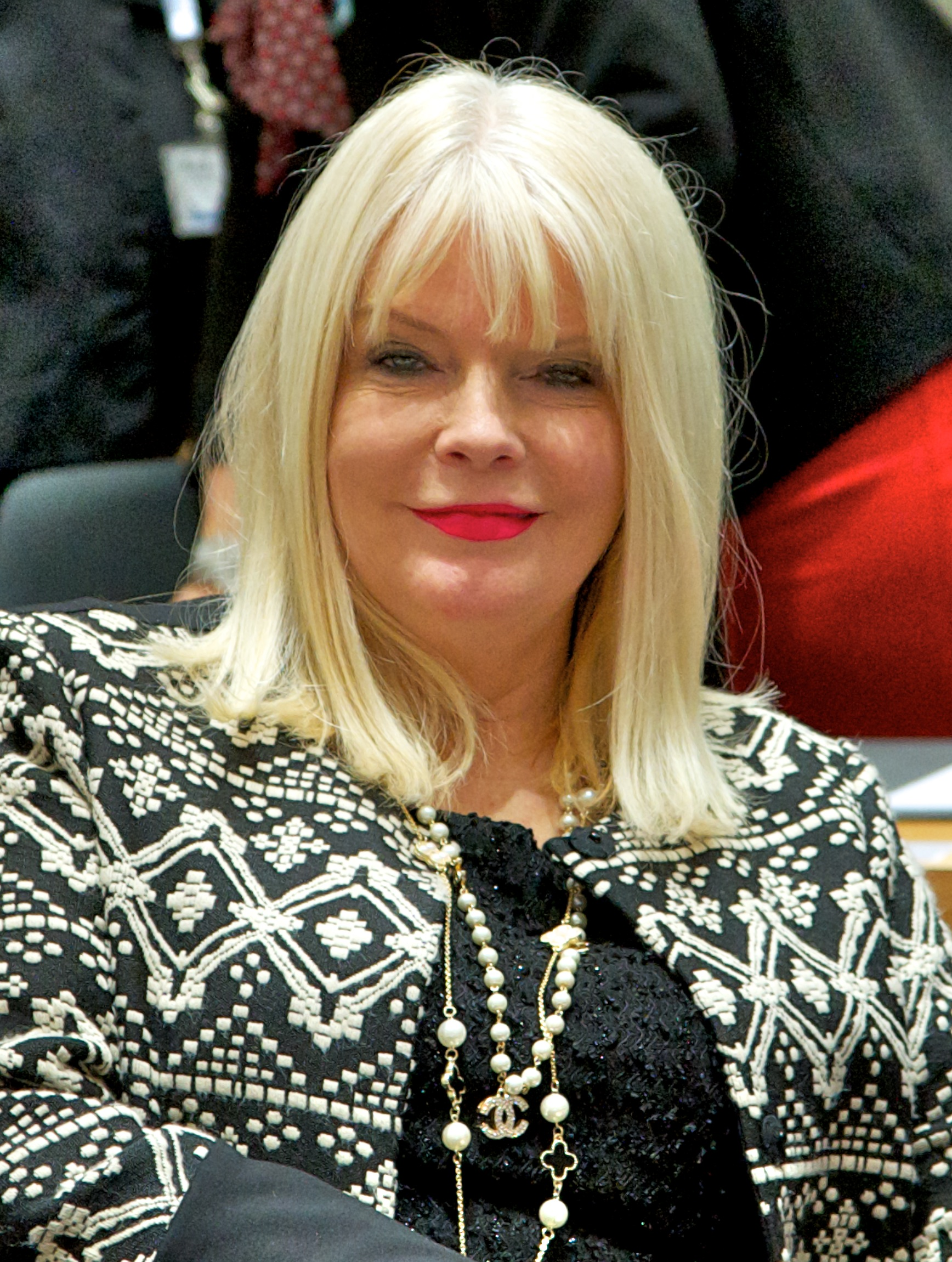
- Mitchell O'Connor in 2017

Minister of State
- 2017–2020: Education and Skills

Minister for Jobs, Enterprise and Innovation
- In office 6 May 2016 – 14 June 2017
- Taoiseach: Enda Kenny
- Preceded by: Richard Bruton
- Succeeded by: Frances Fitzgerald

Teachta Dála
- In office February 2011 – February 2020
- Constituency: Dún Laoghaire

Personal details
- Born: Mary O'Connor; 10 June 1959 (age 67) Milltown, County Galway, Ireland
- Party: Fine Gael
- Other political affiliations: Progressive Democrats (2004–2007)
- Spouse: Joe Mitchell (m. 1984; div. 2004)
- Children: 2
- Education: Carysfort College; NUI, Maynooth
- Website: marymitchelloconnor.ie

Mary Mitchell O'Connor (born 10 June 1959) is an Irish former Fine Gael politician who served as a Minister of State from 2017 to 2020 and Minister for Jobs, Enterprise and Innovation from 2016 to 2017. She served as a Teachta Dála (TD) for the Dún Laoghaire constituency from 2011 to 2020.

== Early and personal life ==
Born Mary O'Connor in Milltown, County Galway. She graduated from Carysfort College and NUI, Maynooth, and worked as a teacher. She was appointed principal of Scoil Cholmcille, Skryne, County Meath. In 1999, she became school principal at The Harold School, Glasthule, a position she held until her election to the Dáil.

She lives in Cabinteely, Dublin. She is divorced and has two sons from her marriage.

== Dún Laoghaire–Rathdown County Council: 2004–2011 ==
In 2004, as a Progressive Democrats candidate, she was elected to Dún Laoghaire–Rathdown County Council. As a councillor, she campaigned against the reintroduction of university fees, against the budget-related increase in pupil-teacher ratios. In 2006, when the Maritime Museum closed, she called on the council to financially support it.

In December 2007, she resigned from the Progressive Democrats and joined Fine Gael. Welcoming her to the party, Enda Kenny said that it was "the first move by a Progressive Democrats public representative to join an alternative party since the general election". Mitchell O'Connor said that she "made a decision on how best to represent the people that elected me". In 2008–2009, she was Chairperson of Dún Laoghaire Area Committee for Transport, Economic Development and Planning.

In June 2009, she was re-elected to Dún Laoghaire-Rathdown County Council. She was the Chairperson of Dún Laoghaire Area Committee for Environment, Housing, Culture, Community Development and Amenities.

In August 2010, she called for a reform of Dáil Éireann, so that women can work efficiently there. She campaigned for the eviction of men who are perpetrators of domestic violence.

== Dáil Éireann: 2011–2020 ==
In December 2010, she was selected as a Fine Gael candidate for the Dún Laoghaire constituency.

Mitchell O'Connor was elected as a TD for the Dún Laoghaire constituency at the 2011 general election. The newly elected Fine Gael TD surprised staff at Leinster House on 2 March 2011, by driving her campaign car across the pedestrian plinth in the Dáil car park and down the steps.

On 8 June 2015, Mitchell O'Connor was selected by Dún Laoghaire Fine Gael as their candidate to contest the next general election at a selection convention. She defeated councillors Barry Ward and Maria Bailey, daughter of John Bailey, although Bailey was later added to the ticket, and both were elected. After a delay due to talks on government formation, Mitchell O'Connor was appointed Minister for Jobs, Enterprise and Innovation in May 2016. Faced with the challenges to Ireland posed by the 2016 British vote to leave the European Union, she set up a Brexit unit and boosted staffing in the Industrial Development Authority and Enterprise Ireland.

After Leo Varadkar was appointed Taoiseach in June 2017, she was not re-appointed to cabinet, but was instead appointed by the government as Minister of State at the Department of Education and Skills with responsibility for Higher Education. This was a "super junior" role which allowEd her attend cabinet meetings, without a vote. In November 2018, Mitchell O'Connor announced female only academic posts to increase the proportion of senior female academics in universities and institutes of technology in Ireland. There had never been a female university president in 400 years of higher education. She opened applications to the senior academic leadership initiative in June 2019.

In the 2020 general election, O'Connor stood for re-election but lost her seat. The Irish Times reported her defeat as "the big surprise" of the Dún Laoghaire election.

== Campaigns and policies ==
In July 2011, Mitchell O'Connor organized almost 50 TDs and Senators to wear pink in Leinster House to raise awareness of breast cancer. Mitchell O'Connor is pro-choice and supported repealing the Eighth Amendment.

Political offices
Preceded by Richard Bruton	Minister for Jobs, Enterprise and Innovation; 2016–2017	Succeeded by Frances Fitzgerald

Dáil	Election	Deputy (Party)	Deputy (Party)	Deputy (Party)	Deputy (Party)	Deputy (Party)
21st	1977	David Andrews (FF)	Liam Cosgrave (FG)	Barry Desmond (Lab)	Martin O'Donoghue (FF)	4 seats 1977–1981
22nd	1981	David Andrews (FF)	Liam T. Cosgrave (FG)	Barry Desmond (Lab)	Martin O'Donoghue (FF)	Seán Barrett (FG)
23rd	1982 (Feb)	David Andrews (FF)	Liam T. Cosgrave (FG)	Barry Desmond (Lab)	Martin O'Donoghue (FF)	Seán Barrett (FG)
24th	1982 (Nov)	David Andrews (FF)	Liam T. Cosgrave (FG)	Barry Desmond (Lab)	Monica Barnes (FG)	Seán Barrett (FG)
25th	1987	David Andrews (FF)	Geraldine Kennedy (PDs)	Barry Desmond (Lab)	Monica Barnes (FG)	Seán Barrett (FG)
26th	1989	David Andrews (FF)	Brian Hillery (FF)	Eamon Gilmore (WP)	Monica Barnes (FG)	Seán Barrett (FG)
27th	1992	David Andrews (FF)	Helen Keogh (PDs)	Eamon Gilmore (DL)	Niamh Bhreathnach (Lab)	Seán Barrett (FG)
28th	1997	David Andrews (FF)	Monica Barnes (FG)	Eamon Gilmore (Lab)	Mary Hanafin (FF)	Seán Barrett (FG)
29th	2002	Barry Andrews (FF)	Fiona O'Malley (PDs)	Eamon Gilmore (Lab)	Mary Hanafin (FF)	Ciarán Cuffe (GP)
30th	2007	Barry Andrews (FF)	Seán Barrett (Note: Served as Ceann Comhairle in the 31st Dáil from 2011 to 2016 and was returned automatically at the 2016 general election.) (FG)	Eamon Gilmore (Lab)	Mary Hanafin (FF)	Ciarán Cuffe (GP)
31st	2011	Mary Mitchell O'Connor (FG)	Seán Barrett (FG)	Eamon Gilmore (Lab)	Richard Boyd Barrett (PBP)	4 seats from 2011
32nd	2016	Mary Mitchell O'Connor (FG)	Seán Barrett (FG)	Maria Bailey (FG)	Richard Boyd Barrett (AAA–PBP)	4 seats from 2011
33rd	2020	Jennifer Carroll MacNeill (FG)	Ossian Smyth (GP)	Cormac Devlin (FF)	Richard Boyd Barrett (S–PBP)	4 seats from 2011
34th	2024	Jennifer Carroll MacNeill (FG)	Barry Ward (FG)	Cormac Devlin (FF)	Richard Boyd Barrett (PBP–S)	4 seats from 2011
