= Michael Fitzgerald (psychiatrist) =

Irish psychiatrist (born 1946)

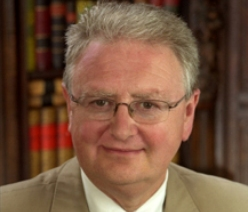
- Fitzgerald in 2006
- Born: 7 October 1946 (age 80); Lucan, Dublin, Ireland
- Spouse: Frances Fitzgerald (m. 1990)
- Children: 3

Academic work
- Discipline: Psychiatrist
- Institutions: Trinity College Dublin
- Website: http://professormichaelfitzgerald.eu

Michael Fitzgerald (born 7 October 1946) is an Irish professor of child and adolescent psychiatry, specialising in autism spectrum disorder (ASD).

== Career ==
His research is in the area of epidemiology of child and adolescent psychiatry. He has been involved in research collaboration in 18 countries and in initiating master's degree programs at Irish universities. He has lectured including in London, at the Royal Society, British Academy, and the British Library and also in New York City, Buenos Aires, Tbilisi, Melbourne and many European countries as well as in China, Malaysia, Korea, and Hawaii. As of June 2005, he said he had diagnosed over 900 individuals with Asperger syndrome.

=== Autism research ===
In 2004's Autism and Creativity: Is There a Link Between Autism in Men and Exceptional Ability?, Fitzgerald claims that Lewis Carroll, Éamon de Valera, Keith Joseph, Ramanujan, Ludwig Wittgenstein and W. B. Yeats may have been autistic.

In 2005's The Genesis of Artistic Creativity: Asperger's Syndrome and the Arts, he claims that historical figures such as Hans Christian Andersen and George Orwell might have been autistic.

== Selected publications ==
- Fitzgerald, Michael (2004). Autism and Creativity: Is there a link between autism in men and exceptional ability?. New York: Brunner Routledge. ISBN 978-1583912133.
- Fitzgerald, Michael (2005). The Genesis of Artistic Creativity: Asperger's Syndrome and the Arts. London and Philadelphia: Jessica Kingsley Publishers. ISBN 1-84310-3346.
- Fitzgerald, Michael (2009). Attention Deficit Hyperactivity Disorder, Creativity, Novelty Seeking and Risk. New York: Nova Science Publishers, Inc. ISBN 978-1604568554.
- Fitzgerald, Michael (2010). Young, Violent & Dangerous to Know. New York: Nova Science Publishers, Inc. ISBN 978-1608769520.
- Fitzgerald, Michael (2014). The Link between Asperger Syndrome and Scientific, Artistic, and Political Creativity: Eleven Case Studies. New York: Edwin Mellen Press. ISBN 978-0-7734-0907-1.
- Walker, Antoinette; Fitzgerald, Michael (2014). Unstoppable Brilliance: Irish Geniuses and Asperger's Syndrome. Dublin: Liberties Press. ISBN 978-1905483280.
- Fitzgerald, Michael (2015). The Mind of the Artist: Attention Deficit Hyperactivity Disorder, Autism, Asperger Syndrome & Depression. New York: Nova Science Publishers, Inc. ISBN 978-1-63463-573-8.
