= James Reilly (Irish politician) =

Irish former politician (born 1955)

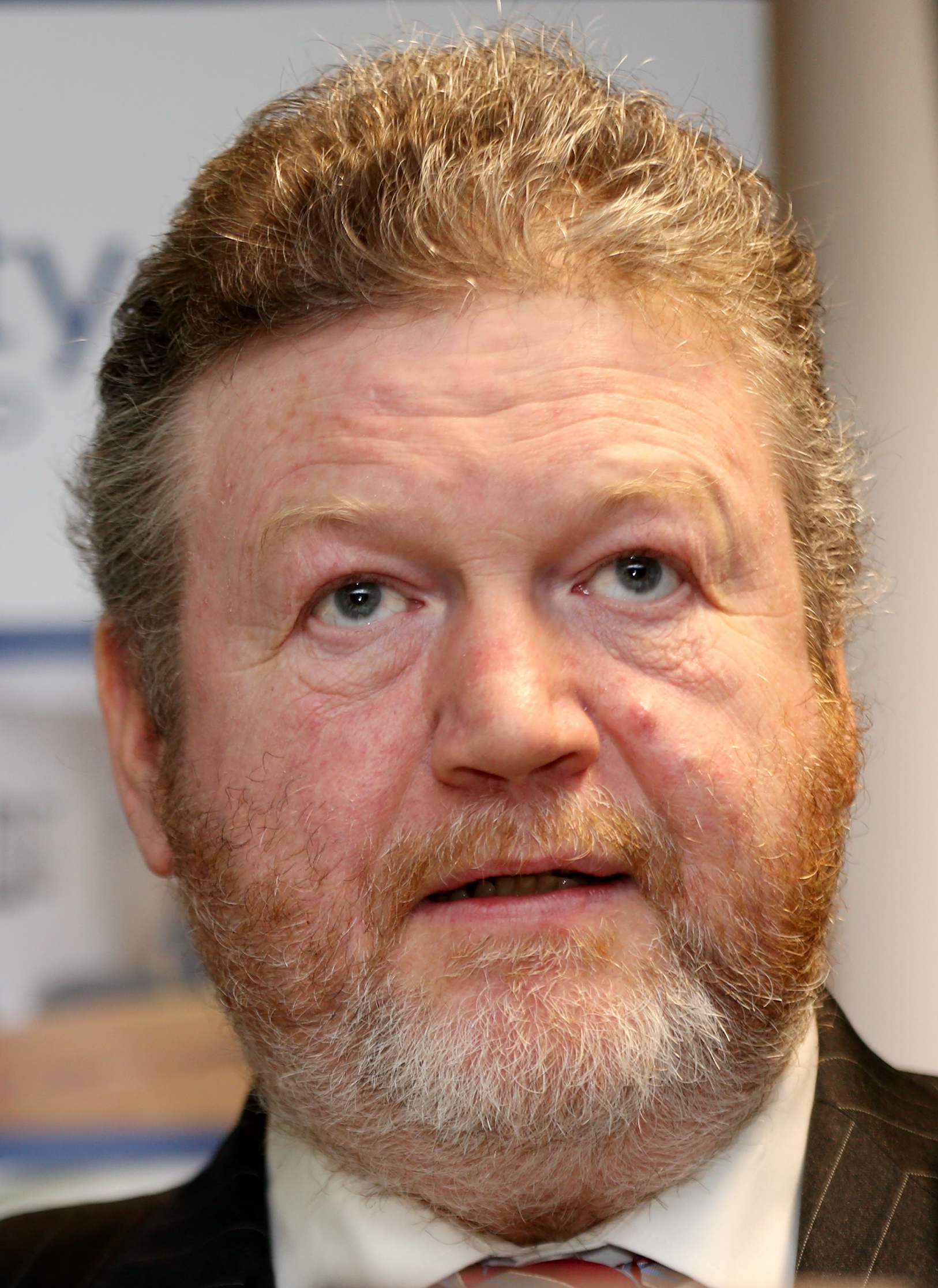
- Reilly in 2014

Senator
- In office 8 June 2016 – 29 June 2020
- Constituency: Nominated by the Taoiseach

Deputy leader of the Fine Gael
- In office 1 July 2010 – 16 May 2017
- Leader: Enda Kenny
- Preceded by: Richard Bruton
- Succeeded by: Simon Coveney

Minister for Children and Youth Affairs
- In office 11 July 2014 – 6 May 2016
- Taoiseach: Enda Kenny
- Preceded by: Charles Flanagan
- Succeeded by: Katherine Zappone

Minister for Health
- In office 9 March 2011 – 11 July 2014
- Taoiseach: Enda Kenny
- Preceded by: Mary Coughlan
- Succeeded by: Leo Varadkar

Teachta Dála
- In office May 2007 – February 2016
- Constituency: Dublin North

Personal details
- Born: 16 August 1955 (age 70) Lusk, County Dublin, Ireland
- Party: Fine Gael
- Spouse: Dorothy Reilly
- Children: 5
- Education: Royal College of Surgeons

James Reilly (born 16 August 1955) is an Irish former Fine Gael politician, businessman and medical doctor who served as a Senator from May 2016 to March 2020. He previously served as Acting Minister for Children and Youth Affairs from February to May 2016, Minister for Health from March 2011 to July 2014 and deputy leader of Fine Gael from 2010 to 2017. He was a Teachta Dála (TD) for the Dublin North constituency from 2007 to 2016. He subsequently announced his retirement from politics after he lost his bid for election for his old seat at the 2020 general election.

== Personal life ==
Reilly graduated with a medical degree from the Royal College of Surgeons in Ireland in 1979 and is a qualified General Practitioner. Reilly was president of the Irish Medical Organisation prior to his election. He was appointed as party spokesperson on Health in 2007 and promoted to deputy leader in a reshuffle on 1 July 2010.

He has worked as a GP in the North County Dublin area for the past 25 years, with surgeries formerly in Lusk and Donabate. Reilly currently has a surgery in Lusk.

== Political career ==
=== Minister for Health: 2011–2014 ===
For his first official trip as Health Minister, Reilly embarked on an expedition to China. His second official trip was for a meeting on non-communicable diseases in New York City from 17 to 20 September 2011.

He conceded for the first time on 17 January 2012 that budget cuts he was implementing would affect frontline health services.

His predecessor, Mary Coughlan, referred to the number of patients on trolleys as a "national emergency". Shortly before becoming Minister for Health the number of patients on trolleys reached a new record high of 569. On taking office, James Reilly vowed that "never again" would we see 569 patients on trolleys. The number of patients waiting on trolleys dipped for a time following his appointment as Minister for Health, but grew again before he left office.

Reilly instructed his department to start collating an outpatient waiting list for the first time, which, when it was first published in March 2013 showed over 100,000 patients waiting over a year. Thousands of them were waiting over four years. By December 2013, this waiting list had been reduced by 95 percent. The number of patients waiting over 8 months for an inpatient or daycase procedure has now been reduced by 99%.

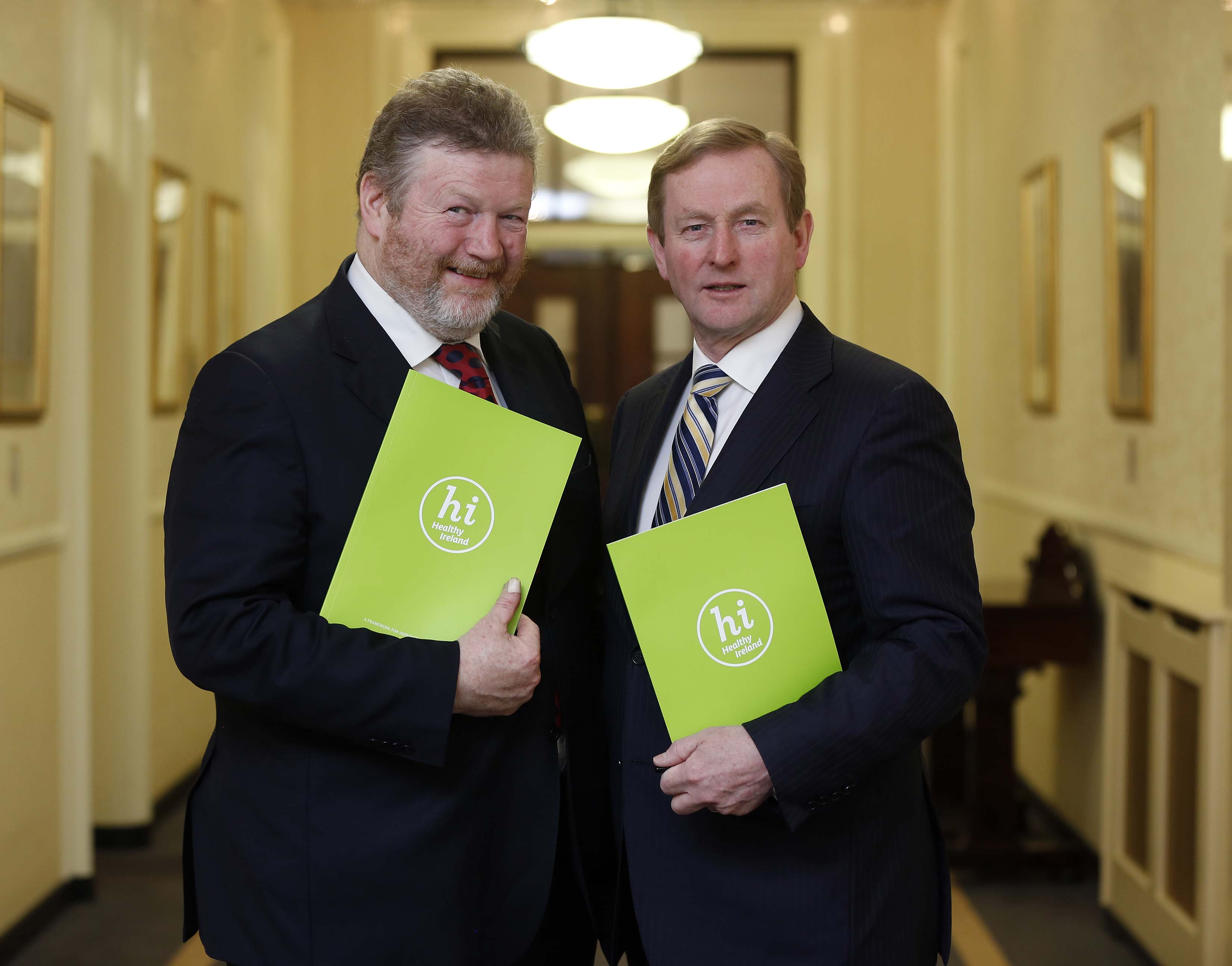
Minister Reilly with Taoiseach Enda Kenny in March 2013

In July 2012, Reilly was named on a debt defaulters' list as owing a debt of €1.9 million together with four others on foot of a judgment which had been registered in the High Court. The dispute was eventually settled with the nursing home at the centre of the dispute sold.

Fianna Fáil and Sinn Féin tabled a motion of no confidence in Reilly on 3 September 2012 after more cuts in the health service. He says the search for savings would focus on tackling "inefficiencies and waste", such as excessive sick leave and overtime. The Labour junior minister Róisín Shortall addressed the Dáil during this motion and did not indicate her support for him or mention his name once, though she did not vote against the motion. Reilly won the vote of no confidence by 99 to 49. On 26 September 2012, Shortall resigned as Minister of State for Primary Care and her party whip, citing lack of support and the lack of an explanation from Reilly as to what criteria were used to select an extra 15 sites for primary care centres, including the placement of two such centres in Reilly's own constituency.

Just two weeks after the motion of no confidence, Reilly unilaterally cut Irish consultants salary. Compared to salaries from 2008, the cut represents over a 40% drop, the largest cut in the public sector. Controversially, this salary cut applied to not only new consultant contracts but also to existing consultants who moved to take up a similar position in a different hospital. Since this pay cut there has been difficulty in recruiting consultants with several posts receiving no applicants. While under questions from the Oireachtas, Minister Reilly downplayed the recruitment problems and stated "there is not the great crisis chaos that the Irish Hospital Consultants Association would like to paint". Two days following this the Minister stated "it was never my intention that somebody who has spent 10 years working as a cardiologist...would be expected to return here and commence work at the starting point on the salary scale, that, clearly, does not make sense".

=== Minister for Children and Youth Affairs: 2014–2016 ===
Reilly was moved to the position of Minister for Children and Youth Affairs in a cabinet reshuffle in July 2014. He retained responsibility for Public Health and anti-smoking policy.

In this role he faced controversy over the Catholic church's constitutional right to give preference in admission at church controlled schools to baptized Catholic children. Virtually all of Ireland's state-funded primary schools (97%) are under church control. Irish law allows schools under church control to consider religion the main factor in admissions. Oversubscribed schools often choose to admit Catholics over non-Catholics, a situation that has created difficulty for non-Catholic families. The United Nations Committee on the Rights of the Child in Geneva asked Reilly to explain the continuation of preferential access to state-funded schools on the basis of religion. He said that the laws probably needed to change, but noted it may take a referendum because the Irish constitution gives protections to religious institutions. The issue is most problematic in the Dublin area. A petition initiated by a Dublin attorney, Paddy Monahan, received almost 20,000 signatures in favor of overturning the preference given to Catholic children. An advocacy group, Education Equality, planned a legal challenge.

Reilly lost his seat at the 2016 general election. He retained his position as Minister for Children and Youth Affairs until talks on government formation had concluded and his successor, Katherine Zappone, was appointed. He was the Fine Gael Seanad spokesperson on Jobs, Enterprise and Innovation in the 25th Seanad.

=== Abortion ===
At a meeting of Fine Gael ministers in November 2015, James Reilly reportedly 'faced down' then-Taoiseach Enda Kenny, demanding a referendum on Ireland's abortion laws. He reportedly told the Taoiseach repeatedly: "I said it, I believe it and I'll say it again." He took a swipe again at the Taoiseach when he told a group of young voters to "never stand back because others try to shut you down".

Kenny's Fine Gael-led minority government took office after the 2016 election with a programme which promised a randomly selected Citizens' Assembly to report on possible changes to the Eighth Amendment, which would be considered by an Oireachtas committee, to whose report the government would respond officially in debates in both houses of the Oireachtas. Leo Varadkar replaced Enda Kenny as Taoiseach on 14 June 2017 and promised to hold a referendum on abortion in 2018.

=== Smoking ===
Reilly has called the tobacco industry “evil”, claimed that they “target our children” and declared “war” on them. Both his father and brother died from smoking related illnesses. He received cabinet approval to aim to make Ireland a tobacco free country – defined as a smoking rate below 5% - by 2025. Ireland became the second country in the world to commit to introducing plain tobacco packaging. He has taken a defiant attitude to threats of legal action from the tobacco industry. During the Irish Presidency of the European Union, Reilly prioritised the Tobacco Products Directive. He secured the agreement of the European Council within just six months. Health Commissioner Tonio Borg praised his ability in securing this agreement. When the Tobacco Directive's future became doubtful because of tobacco industry lobbying in the European Parliament, Reilly arranged for letters supporting the directive to be sent to MEPs from himself, the Taoiseach, 16 European Health ministers and the World Health Organisation. In an unusual move in Irish politics, Reilly accepted a Bill proposed by independent Senators which aims to ban smoking in cars where children are present.

=== Retirement ===
He unsuccessfully contested the Dublin Fingal by-election in November 2019, but was eliminated before the final count, and was not elected. He stood again for Fine Gael in Dublin Fingal at the 2020 general election and was defeated again, winning only 5.2% of the first-preference votes. Shortly after his third defeat, Reilly announced his retirement from politics.

Political offices
Preceded by Mary Coughlan	Minister for Health; 2011–2014	Succeeded by Leo Varadkar
Preceded by Charles Flanagan	Minister for Children and Youth Affairs; 2014–2016	Succeeded by Katherine Zappone
Party political offices
Preceded by Richard Bruton	Deputy leader of Fine Gael; 2010–2017	Succeeded by Simon Coveney

Dáil	Election	Deputy (Party)	Deputy (Party)	Deputy (Party)	Deputy (Party)	Deputy (Party)	Deputy (Party)	Deputy (Party)	Deputy (Party)
4th	1923	Alfie Byrne (Ind.)	Francis Cahill (CnaG)	Margaret Collins-O'Driscoll (CnaG)	Seán McGarry (CnaG)	William Hewat (BP)	Richard Mulcahy (CnaG)	Seán T. O'Kelly (Rep)	Ernie O'Malley (Rep)
4th	1925 by-election	Alfie Byrne (Ind.)	Patrick Leonard (CnaG)	Margaret Collins-O'Driscoll (CnaG)	Oscar Traynor (Rep)	William Hewat (BP)	Richard Mulcahy (CnaG)	Seán T. O'Kelly (Rep)	Ernie O'Malley (Rep)
5th	1927 (Jun)	Alfie Byrne (Ind.)	John Byrne (CnaG)	Margaret Collins-O'Driscoll (CnaG)	Oscar Traynor (SF)	Denis Cullen (Lab)	Richard Mulcahy (CnaG)	Seán T. O'Kelly (FF)	Kathleen Clarke (FF)
6th	1927 (Sep)	Alfie Byrne (Ind.)	John Byrne (CnaG)	Margaret Collins-O'Driscoll (CnaG)	Patrick Leonard (CnaG)	James Larkin (IWL)	Richard Mulcahy (CnaG)	Seán T. O'Kelly (FF)	Eamonn Cooney (FF)
6th	1928 by-election	Alfie Byrne (Ind.)	John Byrne (CnaG)	Margaret Collins-O'Driscoll (CnaG)	Patrick Leonard (CnaG)	Vincent Rice (CnaG)	Richard Mulcahy (CnaG)	Seán T. O'Kelly (FF)	Eamonn Cooney (FF)
6th	1929 by-election	Thomas F. O'Higgins (CnaG)	John Byrne (CnaG)	Margaret Collins-O'Driscoll (CnaG)	Patrick Leonard (CnaG)	Vincent Rice (CnaG)	Richard Mulcahy (CnaG)	Seán T. O'Kelly (FF)	Eamonn Cooney (FF)
7th	1932	Alfie Byrne (Ind.)	John Byrne (CnaG)	Margaret Collins-O'Driscoll (CnaG)	Oscar Traynor (FF)	Cormac Breathnach (FF)	Richard Mulcahy (CnaG)	Seán T. O'Kelly (FF)	Eamonn Cooney (FF)
8th	1933	Alfie Byrne (Ind.)	Patrick Belton (CnaG)	Vincent Rice (CnaG)	Oscar Traynor (FF)	Cormac Breathnach (FF)	Richard Mulcahy (CnaG)	Seán T. O'Kelly (FF)	Eamonn Cooney (FF)
9th	1937	Constituency abolished. See Dublin North-East and Dublin North-West							

Dáil	Election	Deputy (Party)	Deputy (Party)	Deputy (Party)	Deputy (Party)
22nd	1981	Ray Burke (FF)	John Boland (FG)	Nora Owen (FG)	3 seats 1981–1992
23rd	1982 (Feb)	Ray Burke (FF)	John Boland (FG)	Nora Owen (FG)	3 seats 1981–1992
24th	1982 (Nov)	Ray Burke (FF)	John Boland (FG)	Nora Owen (FG)	3 seats 1981–1992
25th	1987	Ray Burke (FF)	John Boland (FG)	G. V. Wright (FF)	3 seats 1981–1992
26th	1989	Ray Burke (FF)	Nora Owen (FG)	Seán Ryan (Lab)	3 seats 1981–1992
27th	1992	Ray Burke (FF)	Nora Owen (FG)	Seán Ryan (Lab)	Trevor Sargent (GP)
28th	1997	Ray Burke (FF)	Nora Owen (FG)	G. V. Wright (FF)	Trevor Sargent (GP)
28th	1998 by-election	Seán Ryan (Lab)	Nora Owen (FG)	G. V. Wright (FF)	Trevor Sargent (GP)
29th	2002	Seán Ryan (Lab)	Jim Glennon (FF)	G. V. Wright (FF)	Trevor Sargent (GP)
30th	2007	James Reilly (FG)	Michael Kennedy (FF)	Darragh O'Brien (FF)	Trevor Sargent (GP)
31st	2011	James Reilly (FG)	Alan Farrell (FG)	Brendan Ryan (Lab)	Clare Daly (SP)
32nd	2016	Constituency abolished. See Dublin Fingal			
