= Frances Fitzgerald (politician) =

Irish politician (born 1950)

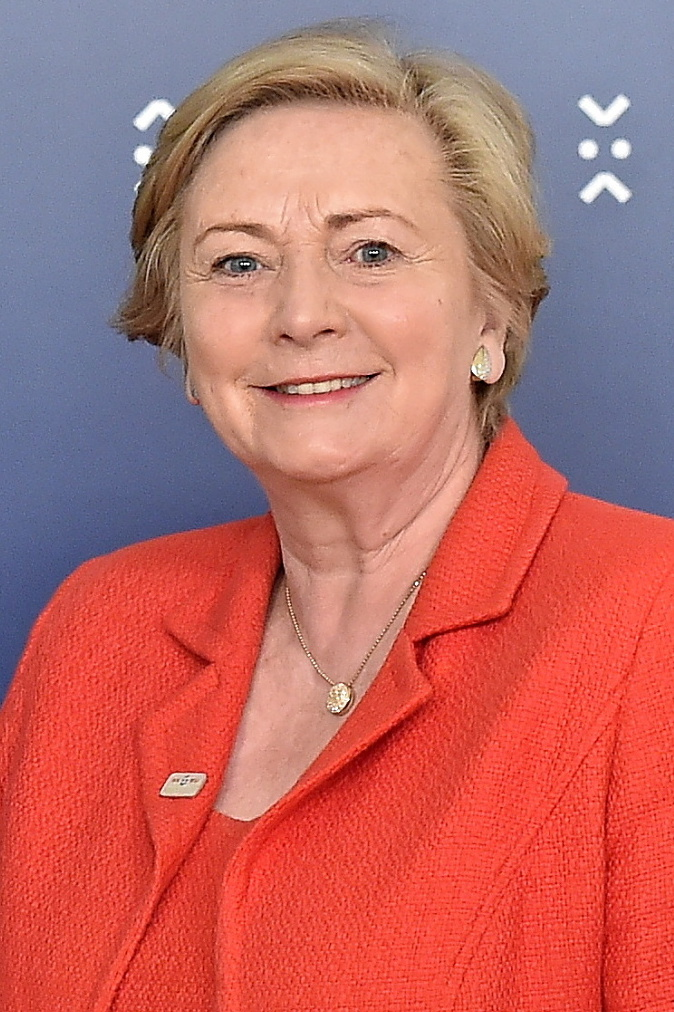
- Fitzgerald in 2016

Tánaiste
- In office 6 May 2016 – 28 November 2017
- Taoiseach: Enda Kenny; Leo Varadkar
- Preceded by: Joan Burton
- Succeeded by: Simon Coveney

Minister for Business, Enterprise and Innovation
- In office 14 June 2017 – 28 November 2017
- Taoiseach: Leo Varadkar
- Preceded by: Mary Mitchell O'Connor
- Succeeded by: Heather Humphreys

Minister for Justice and Equality
- In office 8 May 2014 – 14 June 2017
- Taoiseach: Enda Kenny
- Preceded by: Alan Shatter
- Succeeded by: Charles Flanagan

Minister for Children and Youth Affairs
- In office 9 March 2011 – 7 May 2014
- Taoiseach: Enda Kenny
- Preceded by: New office
- Succeeded by: Charles Flanagan

Leader of Fine Gael in the Seanad
- In office 13 September 2007 – 25 February 2011
- Leader: Enda Kenny
- Preceded by: Michael Finucane
- Succeeded by: Maurice Cummins

Member of the European Parliament
- In office 2 July 2019 – 17 July 2024
- Constituency: Dublin

Teachta Dála
- In office February 2011 – July 2019
- Constituency: Dublin Mid-West
- In office November 1992 – June 2002
- Constituency: Dublin South-East

Senator
- In office 13 September 2007 – 25 February 2011
- Constituency: Labour Panel

Personal details
- Born: Frances Ryan; 1 August 1950 (age 76) Croom, County Limerick, Ireland
- Party: Fine Gael
- Spouse: Michael Fitzgerald (m. 1990)
- Children: 3
- Education: University College Dublin; London School of Economics
- Website: Official website

Frances Fitzgerald (née Ryan; born 1 August 1950) is a former Irish Fine Gael politician who served as Tánaiste from 2016 to 2017, Minister for Business, Enterprise and Innovation from June 2017 to November 2017, Minister for Justice and Equality from 2014 to 2016, Minister for Children and Youth Affairs from 2011 to 2014, and Leader of Fine Gael in the Seanad from 2007 to 2011. She served as a Member of the European Parliament (MEP) for the Dublin constituency from 2019 to 2024 and a Teachta Dála (TD) from 1992 to 2002 and 2011 to 2019. She was also a Senator for the Labour Panel from 2007 to 2011.

She was the second Fine Gael politician to ever hold the office of Tánaiste, after Peter Barry in 1987.

== Early and personal life ==
Born in Croom, County Limerick, she was educated at the Holy Family Secondary School Newbridge, the Dominican College Sion Hill, University College Dublin and the London School of Economics, where she studied a Masters in Social Administration and Social Work. She is a former social worker.

She is married to Professor of Psychiatry Michael Fitzgerald, with whom she has three sons.

== Political career ==
Fitzgerald was first elected to Dáil Éireann as a Fine Gael TD for the Dublin South-East constituency, at the 1992 general election. She retained her seat at the 1997 general election. She served as opposition spokesperson for Defence from 1997 until 2000. She lost her seat at the 2002 general election. She then stood for election to the 22nd Seanad, for the Administrative Panel, but was unsuccessful.

At the 1999 local elections, she was elected as a member of Dublin City Council for the Rathmines local electoral area, she sought to contest the 2004 local elections for the Rathmines ward but was not selected at the convention, losing out to Edie Wynne and Brian Gillen. She was not subsequently added to the ticket.

Before being elected a TD, she had been a high-profile Chair of the Council for the Status of Women from 1988 to 1992.

She was the Fine Gael candidate at the 2007 general election for the Dublin Mid-West constituency, but was not elected. She was elected to the Seanad in July 2007. On 12 September 2007, she was appointed leader of the Fine Gael group in Seanad Éireann and was also Fine Gael Seanad Spokesperson on Health and Children and a member of the Fine Gael Front Bench.

=== Minister for Children and Youth Affairs (2011–2014) ===
She was elected as a Fine Gael TD for the Dublin Mid-West constituency at the 2011 and 2016 general elections. On 9 March 2011, she was appointed as Minister for Children and Youth Affairs. In the role, she spoke out forcefully against the Catholic Church's role in covering up child abuse. She piloted the referendum on children's rights in 2012. As a result, Article 42a was inserted into the Constitution. She enacted the Children First legislation, to raise awareness of child abuse and neglect and to improve child protection.

=== Minister for Justice and Equality (2014–2017) ===
On 8 May 2014, Fitzgerald succeeded Alan Shatter as Minister for Justice and Equality.

Fitzgerald has spoken out in support of young families and believes the government should take a more proactive role in helping parents and children. "I feel so strongly about the State taking a more proactive role around childcare, paternity leave and parental leave," she noted. "I do want to see us getting to the place where the State is more supportive when it comes to childcare. We have been slow enough on that."

In early 2016, when gangland activity became an issue in Dublin, Fitzgerald committed that there would be a permanent armed response unit in Dublin.

On 6 May 2016, Fitzgerald was reappointed as Minister for Justice and Equality. She was also promoted to the position of Tánaiste by Taoiseach Enda Kenny.

After the 2017 Fine Gael leadership election, brought about by Enda Kenny's resignation as party leader, Fitzgerald "seriously considered" putting her name down as a candidate for leader but ultimately decided against it.

After Leo Varadkar was elected leader of Fine Gael, and by extension Taoiseach-designate, he was asked whether he would make his rival Simon Coveney Tánaiste. He confirmed Fitzgerald would remain as Tánaiste, saying "we have a Tánaiste, it's Frances Fitzgerald and I think she's doing an excellent job". On his appointment as Taoiseach, Varadkar retained Fitzgerald as Tánaiste, but moved her from Justice and Equality to Business, Enterprise and Innovation. Charles Flanagan succeeded her as Minister of Justice and Equality.

=== Resignation ===
In November 2017, Fitzgerald was accused of interference in the case of a whistleblower, who had claimed widespread malpractice and corruption in the Garda Síochána. She denied the allegation. Leader of the Opposition Micheál Martin threatened a vote of no confidence, jeopardising the confidence and supply between Fine Gael and Fianna Fáil. Whilst retaining support from many within her party, several Fine Gael deputies called on her to resign. On 28 November 2017, Fitzgerald relented, offering her resignation to the Taoiseach, which he accepted.

Fitzgerald was later cleared of blame by the Collins Report in March 2018. In October 2018, the third interim report of the Disclosures Tribunal found that she had "selflessly" resigned in the national interest.

=== European Parliament ===
On 4 March 2019, Fine Gael announced that Fitzgerald would be one of their two candidates for the Dublin constituency in the 2019 European Parliament election. Former SDLP leader Mark Durkan, who joined Fine Gael to contest the election, was also announced as the second candidate. She was elected as an MEP on the 14th count, with 16.23% of first preference votes.

On 6 November 2023, Fitzgerald announced that she would not contest the 2024 European Parliament election.

In March 2024 Fitzgerald was the joint winner, alongside Swedish MEP Evin Incir, of the "European Values Champion of the Mandate" award at The Parliament Magazine's annual MEP Awards.

Political offices
New office	Minister for Children and Youth Affairs; 2011–2014	Succeeded by Charles Flanagan
Preceded by Alan Shatter	Minister for Justice and Equality; 2014–2017	Succeeded by Charles Flanagan
Preceded by Joan Burton	Tánaiste; 2016–2017	Succeeded by Simon Coveney
Preceded by Mary Mitchell O'Connor as Minister for Jobs, Enterprise and Innovation	Minister for Business, Enterprise and Innovation; 2017	Succeeded by Leo Varadkar (acting)

Dáil	Election	Deputy (Party)	Deputy (Party)	Deputy (Party)	Deputy (Party)
13th	1948	John A. Costello (FG)	Seán MacEntee (FF)	Noël Browne (CnaP)	3 seats 1948–1981
14th	1951	John A. Costello (FG)	Seán MacEntee (FF)	Noël Browne (Ind.)	3 seats 1948–1981
15th	1954	John A. Costello (FG)	Seán MacEntee (FF)	John O'Donovan (FG)	3 seats 1948–1981
16th	1957	John A. Costello (FG)	Seán MacEntee (FF)	Noël Browne (Ind.)	3 seats 1948–1981
17th	1961	John A. Costello (FG)	Seán MacEntee (FF)	Noël Browne (NPD)	3 seats 1948–1981
18th	1965	John A. Costello (FG)	Seán MacEntee (FF)	Seán Moore (FF)	3 seats 1948–1981
19th	1969	Garret FitzGerald (FG)	Noël Browne (Lab)	Seán Moore (FF)	3 seats 1948–1981
20th	1973	Garret FitzGerald (FG)	Fergus O'Brien (FG)	Seán Moore (FF)	3 seats 1948–1981
21st	1977	Garret FitzGerald (FG)	Ruairi Quinn (Lab)	Seán Moore (FF)	3 seats 1948–1981
22nd	1981	Garret FitzGerald (FG)	Gerard Brady (FF)	Seán Moore (FF)	Richie Ryan (FG)
23rd	1982 (Feb)	Garret FitzGerald (FG)	Gerard Brady (FF)	Ruairi Quinn (Lab)	Alexis FitzGerald Jnr (FG)
24th	1982 (Nov)	Garret FitzGerald (FG)	Gerard Brady (FF)	Ruairi Quinn (Lab)	Joe Doyle (FG)
25th	1987	Garret FitzGerald (FG)	Gerard Brady (FF)	Ruairi Quinn (Lab)	Michael McDowell (PDs)
26th	1989	Garret FitzGerald (FG)	Gerard Brady (FF)	Ruairi Quinn (Lab)	Joe Doyle (FG)
27th	1992	Frances Fitzgerald (FG)	Eoin Ryan Jnr (FF)	Ruairi Quinn (Lab)	Michael McDowell (PDs)
28th	1997	Frances Fitzgerald (FG)	Eoin Ryan Jnr (FF)	Ruairi Quinn (Lab)	John Gormley (GP)
29th	2002	Michael McDowell (PDs)	Eoin Ryan Jnr (FF)	Ruairi Quinn (Lab)	John Gormley (GP)
30th	2007	Lucinda Creighton (FG)	Chris Andrews (FF)	Ruairi Quinn (Lab)	John Gormley (GP)
31st	2011	Lucinda Creighton (FG)	Eoghan Murphy (FG)	Ruairi Quinn (Lab)	Kevin Humphreys (Lab)
32nd	2016	Constituency abolished. See Dublin Bay South.			

Dáil	Election	Deputy (Party)	Deputy (Party)	Deputy (Party)	Deputy (Party)	Deputy (Party)
29th	2002	Paul Gogarty (GP)	3 seats 2002–2007	Mary Harney (PDs)	John Curran (FF)	4 seats 2002–2024
30th	2007	Paul Gogarty (GP)	Joanna Tuffy (Lab)	Mary Harney (PDs)	John Curran (FF)	4 seats 2002–2024
31st	2011	Robert Dowds (Lab)	Joanna Tuffy (Lab)	Frances Fitzgerald (FG)	Derek Keating (FG)	4 seats 2002–2024
32nd	2016	Gino Kenny (AAA–PBP)	Eoin Ó Broin (SF)	Frances Fitzgerald (FG)	John Curran (FF)	4 seats 2002–2024
32nd	2019 by-election	Gino Kenny (AAA–PBP)	Eoin Ó Broin (SF)	Mark Ward (SF)	John Curran (FF)	4 seats 2002–2024
33rd	2020	Gino Kenny (S–PBP)	Eoin Ó Broin (SF)	Mark Ward (SF)	Emer Higgins (FG)	4 seats 2002–2024
34th	2024	Paul Gogarty (Ind.)	Eoin Ó Broin (SF)	Mark Ward (SF)	Emer Higgins (FG)	Shane Moynihan (FF)
