= Simon Coveney =

Irish former politician (born 1972)

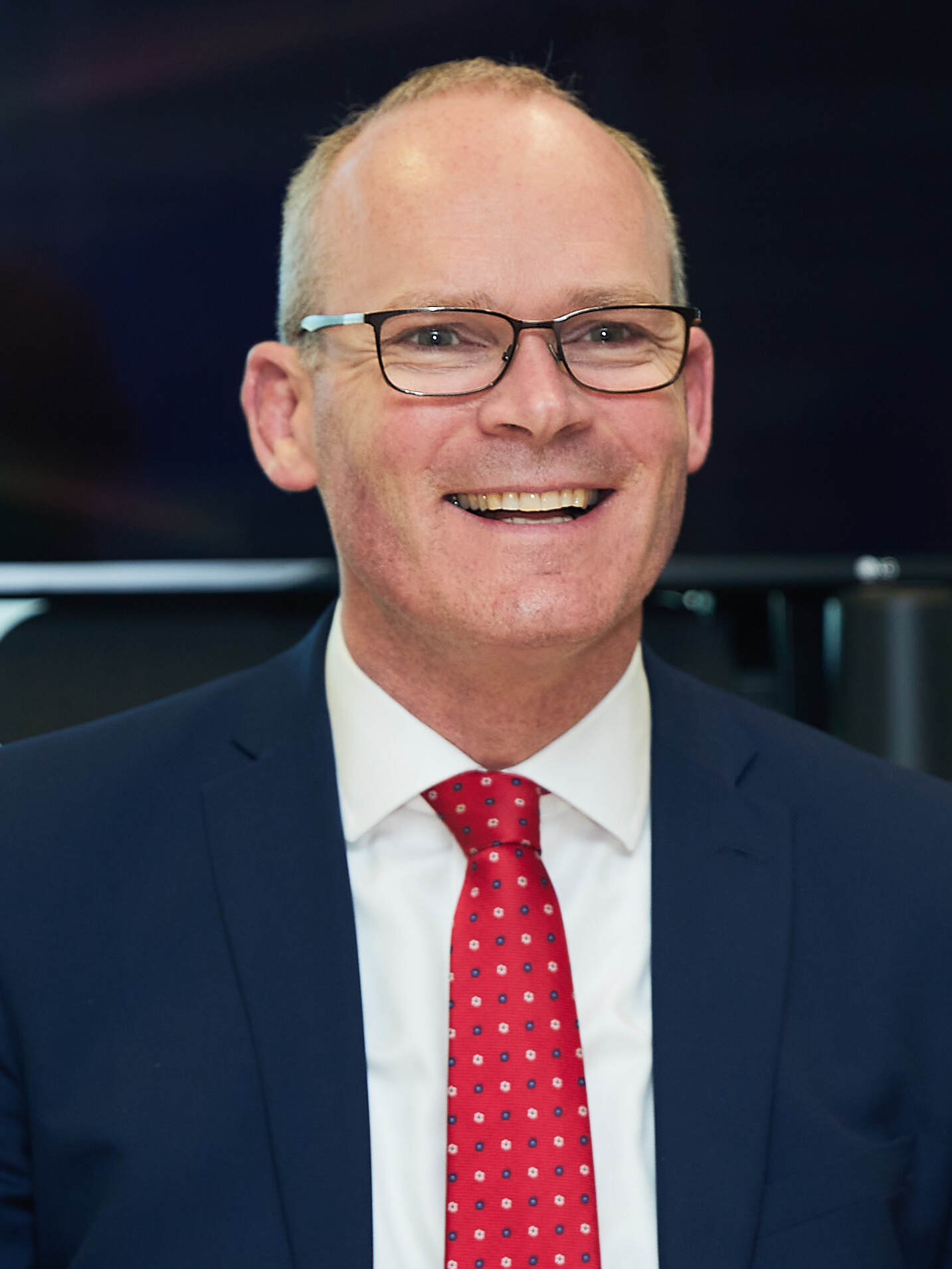
- Coveney in 2022

Tánaiste
- In office 30 November 2017 – 27 June 2020
- Taoiseach: Leo Varadkar
- Preceded by: Frances Fitzgerald
- Succeeded by: Leo Varadkar

Deputy leader of Fine Gael
- In office 13 June 2017 – 5 April 2024
- Leader: Leo Varadkar; Simon Harris
- Preceded by: James Reilly
- Succeeded by: Heather Humphreys
Ministerial positions
Minister for Enterprise, Trade and Employment
In office 17 December 2022 – 9 April 2024
Taoiseach	Leo Varadkar
Preceded by	Leo Varadkar
Succeeded by	Peter Burke
Minister for Defence
In office 27 June 2020 – 17 December 2022
Taoiseach	Micheál Martin
Preceded by	Leo Varadkar
Succeeded by	Micheál Martin
In office 11 July 2014 – 6 May 2016
Taoiseach	Enda Kenny
Preceded by	Enda Kenny
Succeeded by	Enda Kenny
Minister for Foreign Affairs
In office 14 June 2017 – 17 December 2022
Taoiseach	Leo Varadkar; Micheál Martin
Preceded by	Charles Flanagan
Succeeded by	Micheál Martin
Minister for Housing, Planning, Community and Local Government
In office 6 May 2016 – 14 June 2017
Taoiseach	Enda Kenny
Preceded by	Alan Kelly
Succeeded by	Eoghan Murphy
Minister for Agriculture, Food and the Marine
In office 9 March 2011 – 6 May 2016
Taoiseach	Enda Kenny
Preceded by	Brendan Smith
Succeeded by	Michael Creed

Teachta Dála
- In office October 1998 – November 2024
- Constituency: Cork South-Central

Member of the European Parliament
- In office 20 July 2004 – 24 June 2007
- Constituency: South

Personal details
- Born: 16 June 1972 (age 54) Cork, Ireland
- Party: Fine Gael
- Spouse: Ruth Furney (m. 2008)
- Children: 3
- Parent: Hugh Coveney (father)
- Education: University College Cork; Gurteen College; Royal Agricultural University
- Website: simoncoveney.ie

Simon Coveney (born 16 June 1972) is an Irish former Fine Gael politician who served as Minister for Enterprise, Trade and Employment from 2022 to 2024. He served as deputy leader of Fine Gael from 2017 to 2024. He was in the cabinet from 2011 to 2024, holding a range of ministerial portfolios, including as Tánaiste from 2017 to 2020.

He served as a Teachta Dála (TD) for the Cork South-Central constituency from 1998 to 2024, having been elected in a by-election following the death of his father Hugh Coveney. He also served as a Member of the European Parliament (MEP) for the South constituency from 2004 to 2007.

== Early life ==
Coveney was born in Cork in 1972 to Hugh Coveney and Pauline Coveney. He has five brothers and one sister. His father was a chartered quantity surveyor and later a TD, and also a member of one of the famous merchant families in the city. Coveney was educated locally in Cork, before later attending Clongowes Wood College, County Kildare. He was expelled from the college in Transition Year but ultimately was invited back to complete his full six years there. He repeated his Leaving Certificate in Bruce College in Cork. Coveney subsequently attended University College Cork and Gurteen Agricultural College, before completing a BSc in Agriculture and Land Management from Royal Agricultural College, Gloucestershire. In 1997–1998, he led the Sail Chernobyl Project, which involved sailing a boat 30,000 miles around the world and raising €650,000 for charity. He spent several years working as an agriculture adviser and farm manager.

== Political career ==
=== Early years in the Dáil: 1998–2004 ===
Coveney was elected to the 28th Dáil as a Fine Gael candidate for Cork South-Central in a by-election, caused by the death of his father in 1998. Although he was a strong supporter of party leader John Bruton, he remained on the backbenches for a number of years. At the 1999 local elections, he was elected to Cork County Council for the Carrigaline area.

In 2001, discipline in the parliamentary party broke down and Coveney came out against Bruton in a leadership heave. His loss of support was a surprise and encouraged others to vote against Bruton. The subsequent leadership contest was won by Michael Noonan and a new front bench was put in place.

After an initial period on the backbenches, Coveney was promoted to the front bench by Michael Noonan, as deputy chief whip.

Coveney was re-elected at the 2002 general election. Fine Gael lost twenty-three seats at the election including some of its leading party figures. Noonan was replaced as party leader by Enda Kenny, who promoted Coveney to the position of spokesperson on Communications, Marine and Natural Resources, in his new front bench.

=== Member of the European Parliament: 2004–2007 ===
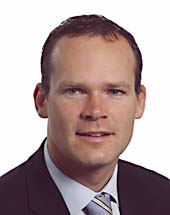
Coveney as an MEP

Coveney was elected to the European Parliament for the South constituency at the 2004 European Parliament election. During his three years as an MEP, Coveney held the position of human rights co-ordinator for the European People's Party Group, and twice authored the Parliament's Annual Report on Human Rights in the world. He spearheaded the Stop the Traffic campaign at the European Parliament. He was a member of the Foreign Affairs Committee and the Delegation for Relations with the United States and a substitute on the Human Rights Subcommittee, Fisheries Committee, Internal Market and Consumer Protection Committee and the Delegation for Relations with Iran.

=== 30th Dáil: 2007–2011 ===
Coveney contested the 2007 general election. He was successful in being returned to the Dáil, and as a result, was required to step down as an MEP. He was replaced in the European Parliament by Colm Burke. Fine Gael won back many of the seats that the party had lost five years earlier; however, they remained in opposition. Coveney returned to the party's front bench as Spokesperson on Communications, Energy and Natural Resources.

In June 2010, Coveney and a number of other front bench members stated that they had no confidence in their party leader, Enda Kenny. Kenny won a motion of confidence in his leadership. Coveney was re-appointed to the front bench as Spokesperson on Transport.

=== Minister for Agriculture, Food and the Marine: 2011–2016 ===
Following the 2011 general election, Kenny led a Fine Gael–Labour Party coalition government. On 9 March 2011, Coveney was appointed as Minister for Agriculture, Food and the Marine. He attended his first meeting of EU Agriculture Ministers, in Brussels on 17 March 2011.

Coveney provoked controversy when, in September 2011, he flew to Algeria, on the government jet at a cost of more than €26,000 to the Irish taxpayer when there were flights available for €16,331. While there, Coveney cut a ribbon at the opening of a supermarket in Oran.

In May 2014, Coveney attended a meeting of the Bilderberg Group, in Copenhagen.

=== Minister for Defence: 2014–2016 ===
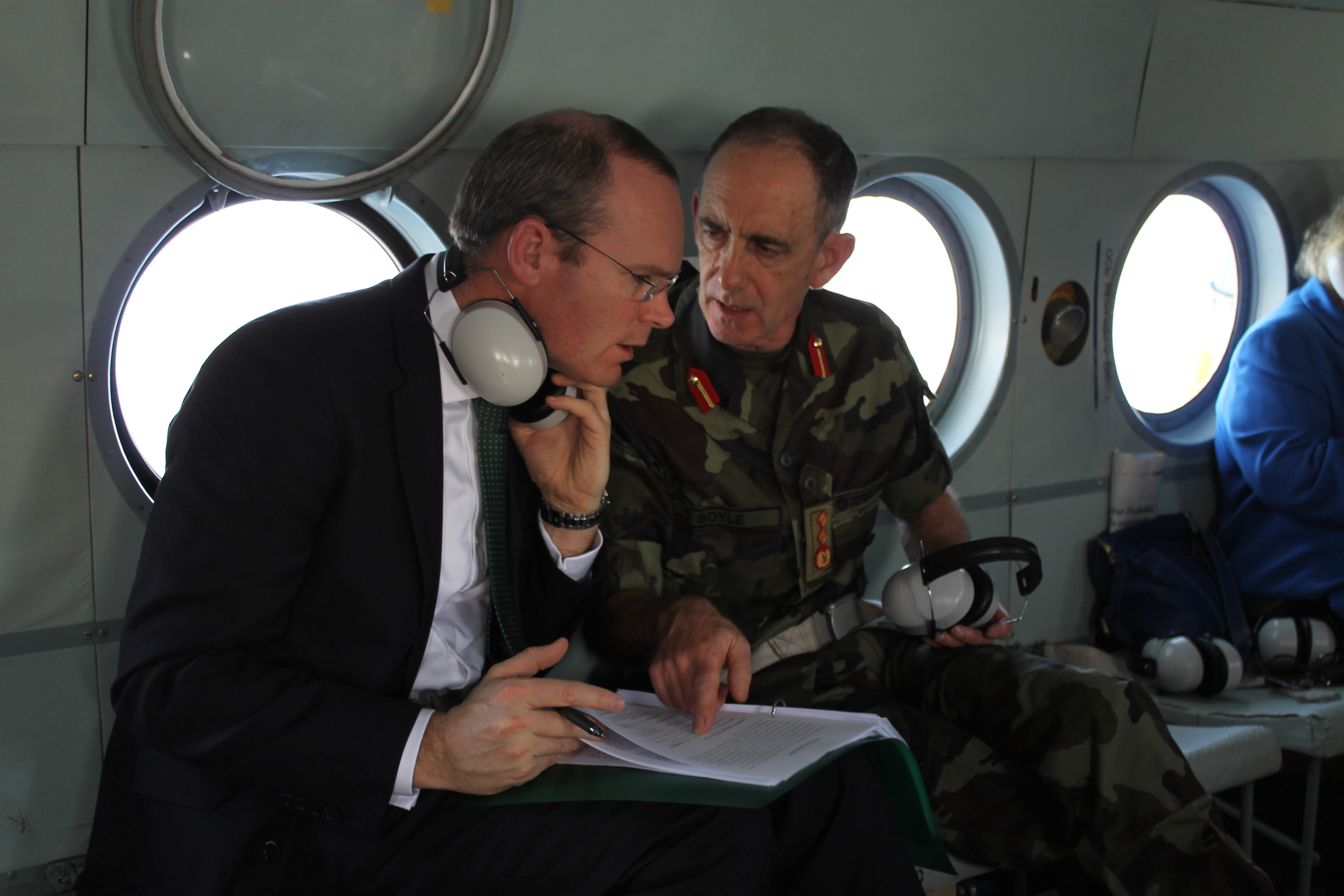
Fmr. Defence Forces Chief of Staff Lt Gen Conor O'Boyle briefing then Minister for Defence Simon Coveney

On 11 July 2014, in a cabinet reshuffle following the resignation of Eamon Gilmore as Tánaiste, Coveney was given an additional appointment as Minister for Defence. In August 2015, he launched a White Paper on Defence.

On 17 June 2015, Coveney questioned the judgment of an experienced Air Corps pilot who refused to fly him to Cork, because of predicted fog. In email correspondence between Department of Defence officials, the Air Corps is described as being "very unhappy" about the incident and indicating that they had never received such a call in 25 years".

In January 2017 it emerged that a number of Air Corps whistleblowers had attempted to contact Coveney while he was defence minister over their concerns about the adverse health impacts of chemicals used to service the force's aircraft. The whistleblowers had complained about being unable to speak to Coveney about the issue, however Coveney claimed he was "not aware of there being any problem with hearing from, or talking to, or understanding the concerns that whistleblowers may have".

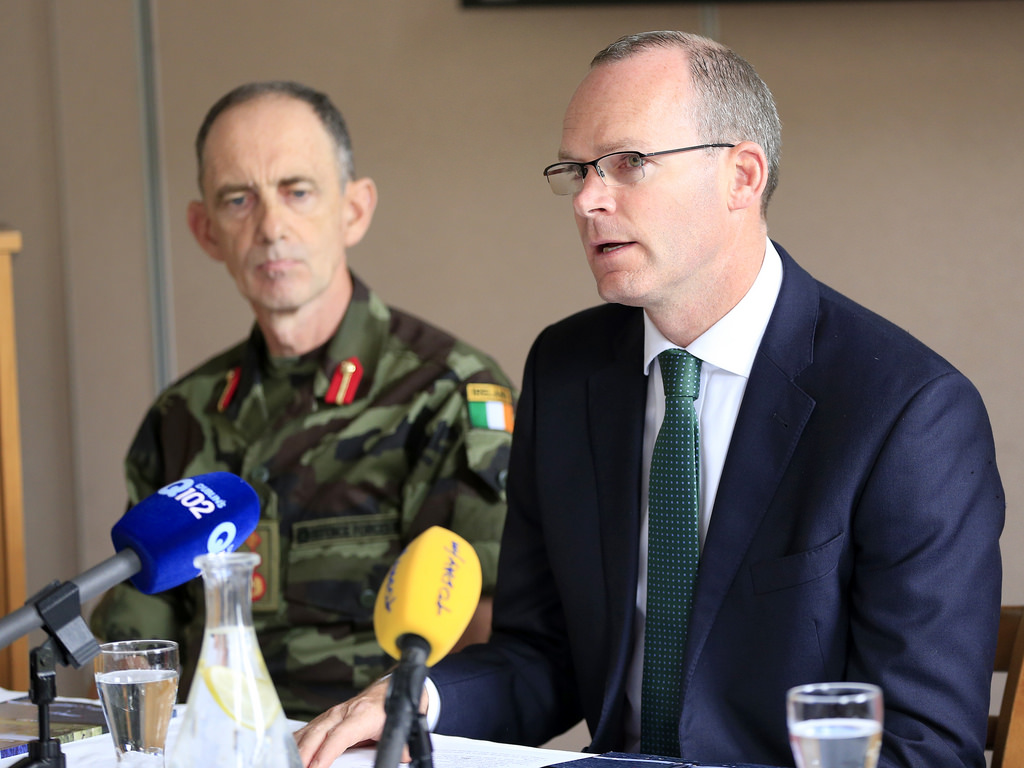
Minister for Defence Coveney at a press conference in September 2014

The Irish Examiner subsequently published a series of text messages between one of the whistleblowers and then-Chief Whip Regina Doherty sent in January 2016. Doherty forwarded a text message onto one of the whistleblowers that she said came from Coveney, in which he said he would call this whistleblower the next day. The call never took place.

Speaking in the Dáil on the revelations, Fianna Fáil leader Micheál Martin described the Government handling of the whistleblowers' complaints as "a scandal".

=== Minister for Housing, Planning, Community and Local Government: 2016–2017 ===
Following the 2016 general election, Fine Gael returned to government. On 6 May 2016, Coveney was appointed as the Minister for Housing, Planning, Community and Local Government, with Taoiseach Enda Kenny taking over the Defence portfolio and Michael Creed becoming the new Minister for Agriculture.

=== Fine Gael leadership election: 2017 ===
Following the resignation of Enda Kenny as party leader, Coveney contested the leadership election. On 2 June 2017, Coveney lost to Leo Varadkar, although he had gaining the support of 65% of party members (party members only had 25% of the vote in Fine Gael's electoral college). On 13 June 2017, Varadkar appointed Coveney the deputy leader of the party.

=== Minister for Foreign Affairs and Trade: 2017–2022 ===
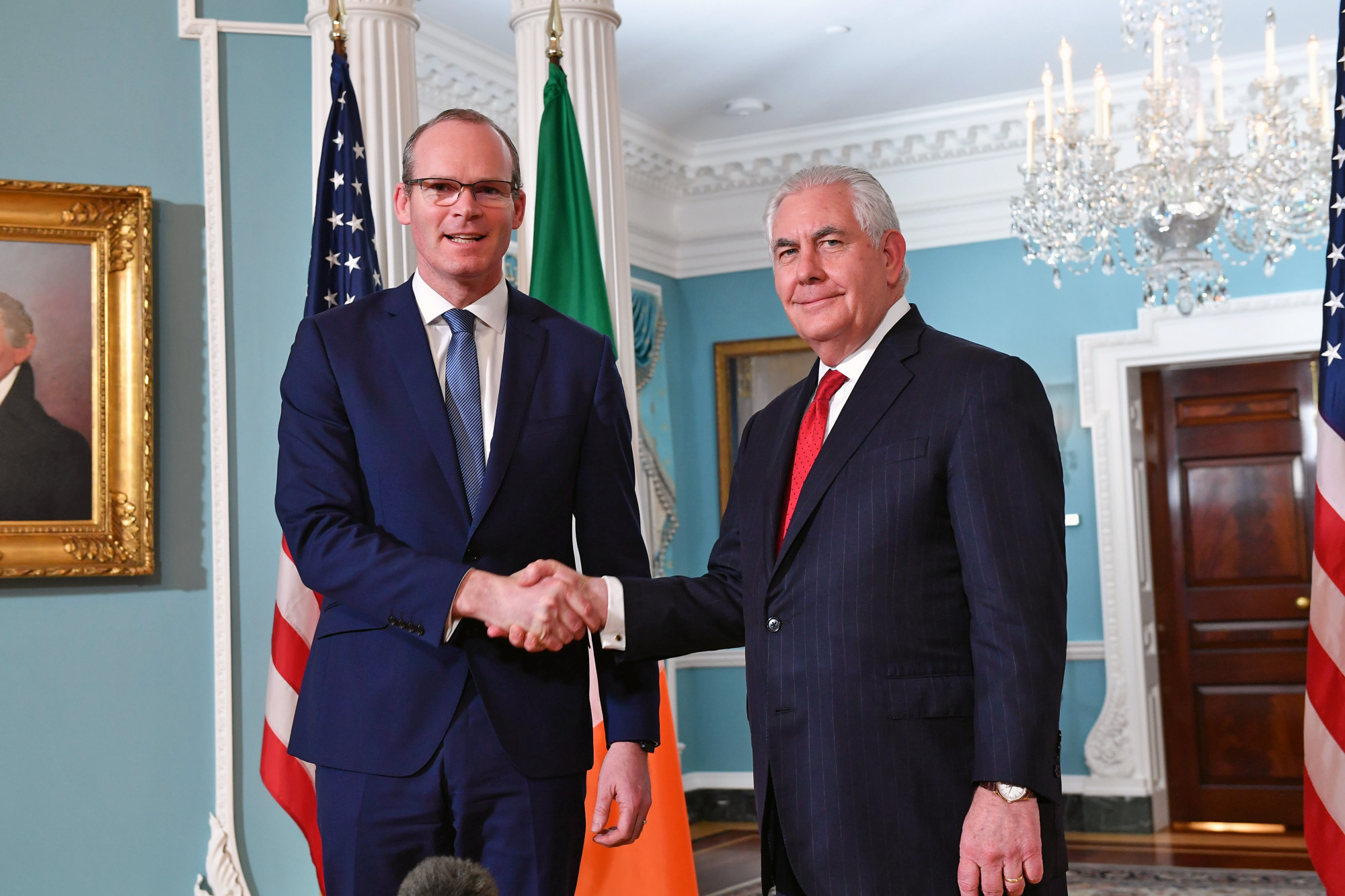
Coveney with US Secretary of State Rex Tillerson in 2018

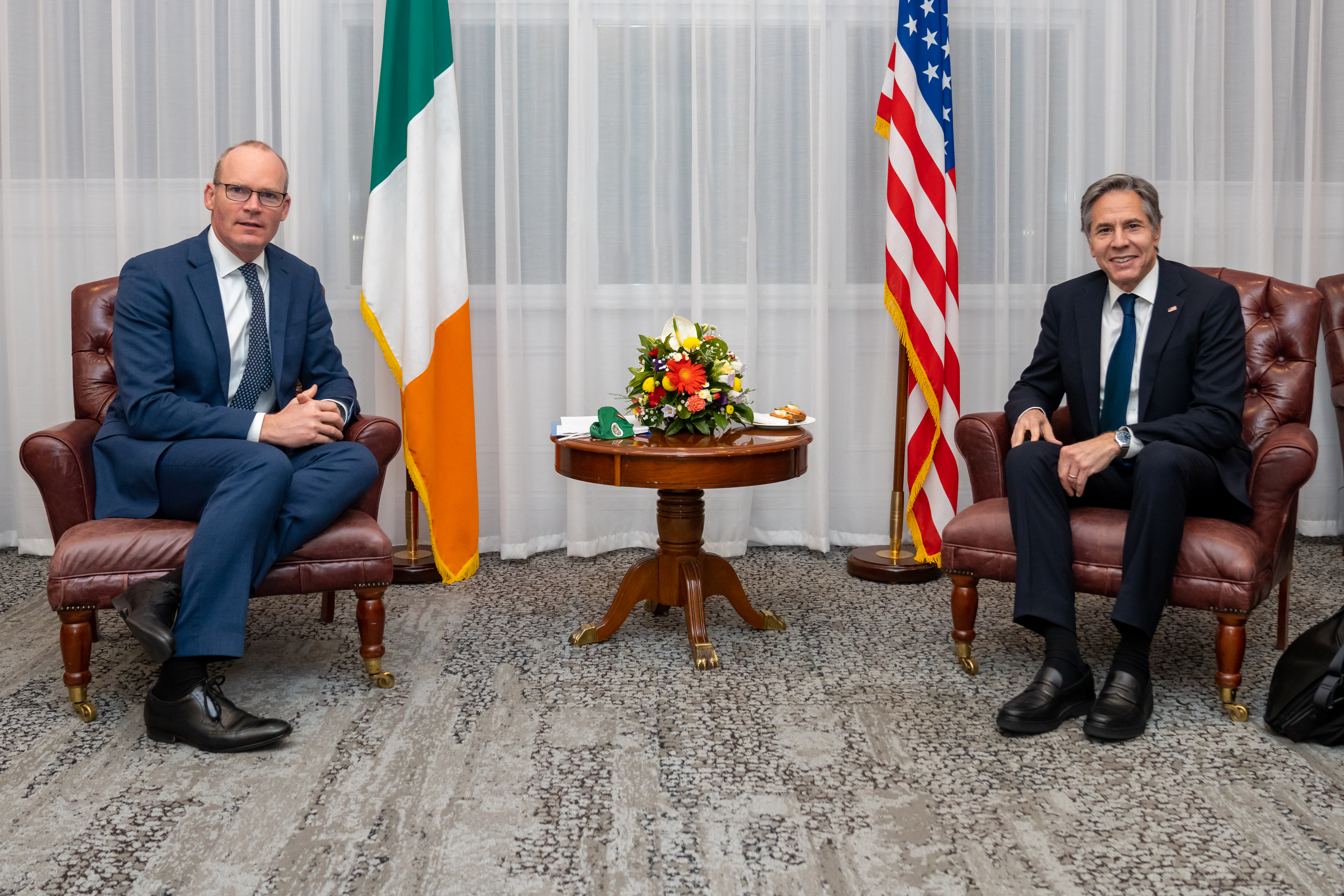
Coveney with US Secretary of State Antony Blinken in 2021

Varadkar succeeded Kenny as Taoiseach and named Coveney as Minister for Foreign Affairs and Trade, with special responsibilities for Brexit. Coveney succeeded Charles Flanagan, who became Minister for Justice and Equality. It was understood Coveney heavily lobbied Varadkar for the role as he wanted a large role on Brexit. From 2018, he has also co-chaired the European People's Party (EPP) Justice and Home Affairs Ministers Meeting, alongside Esteban González Pons.

On 30 November 2017, following the resignation from cabinet of Frances Fitzgerald, Varadkar named Coveney as the new Tánaiste.

According to Lawrence Franklin of the Gatestone Institute, within the Irish government, Coveney opposed the Control of Economic Activity (Occupied Territories) Bill to ban goods produced in Israeli settlements. He has expressed concern that the bill might contravene EU trade law.

In July 2020, following the formation of a coalition government of Fine Gael, Fianna Fáil and the Green Party (led initially by Micheál Martin as Taoiseach), Coveney was re-appointed as Minister for Foreign Affairs. The Trade part of the portfolio was transferred to another government department.

On 25 March 2022, Coveney was giving a speech in Belfast when he forced to leave the stage, following the discovery of a "suspect device" in a hjacked van in the carpark. Coveney had been speaking following a meeting with the John and Pat Hume Foundation.

Coveney and Ireland's ambassador to Ukraine Thérèse Healy visited Ukraine on 13 April 2022 where Coveney met his counterparts, Ukraine foreign minister Dmytro Kuleba and defence minister Oleksii Reznikov, in Kyiv and visited the site of the Bucha massacre the following day. Coveney travelled via Poland and was the first foreign minister on the UN Security Council to visit Ukraine since the Russian invasion began in February. He was also accompanied by a political adviser and a protection team.

On 20 May 2022, Coveney took over from Luigi Di Maio as chairman of the Council of Europe's Committee of Ministers. He served in this role until November 2022.

==== Brexit negotiations ====
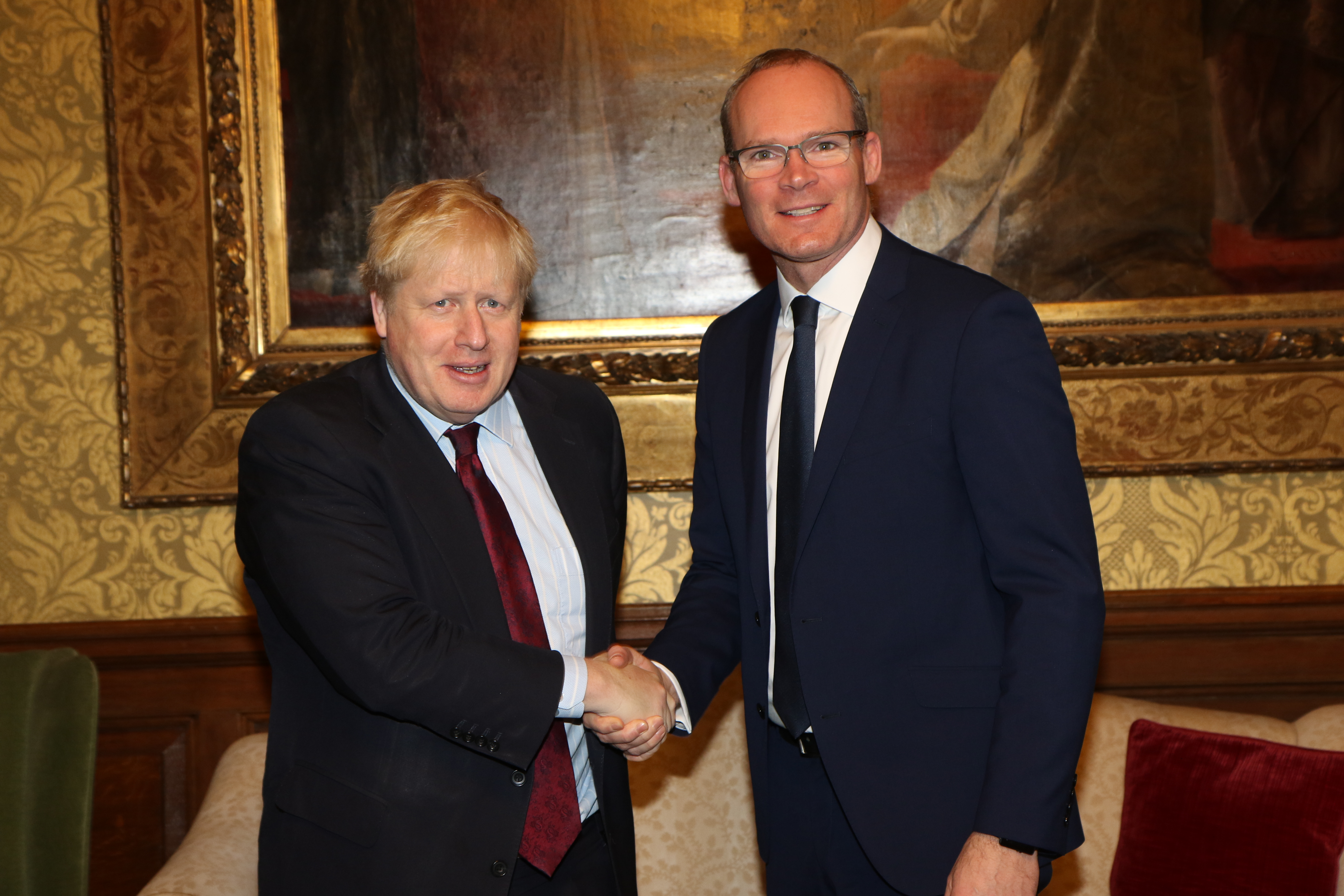
Coveney meets with Boris Johnson in London in 2018

On 27 January 2019, Coveney in an interview with Andrew Marr, said the Irish backstop in the Brexit withdrawal agreement will not be changed. He said the backstop was already a pragmatic compromise between the United Kingdom and the European Union to avoid infrastructure on the Irish border, that there was no sensible legally-sound alternative to the backstop, and that the European Parliament would not ratify a Brexit withdrawal agreement without the backstop in it.

==== COVID-19 pandemic ====
As Minister for Foreign Affairs, Coveney headed up the response to the COVID-19 pandemic on behalf of the government of Ireland. On 10 March 2020, he upgraded travel advice recommending that Irish citizens do not travel to Italy. He added that people should think carefully about unnecessary public gatherings and urged the public to play their part and help themselves by following advice and doing practical things like sneezing and washing hands properly.

==== Katherine Zappone controversy ====
In July 2021, Coveney found himself embroiled in a political scandal relating to the appointment of former Independent TD Katherine Zappone, who had served in cabinet with Coveney, as a special envoy to the UN. During a cabinet meeting of the coalition government, Coveney proposed Zappone for the role without having previously discussed the matter with Taoiseach Micheál Martin. Martin expressed concerns about the appointment but ultimately allowed it. Subsequently, it emerged that Coveney had not advertised or offered the role to anyone but Zappone, and that in the run-up to the appointment, Zappone had hosted an event at the Merrion Hotel in breach of COVID-19 regulations at which members of the political establishment were present, including Tánaiste Leo Varadkar. In response, many opposition parties accused the appointment as being a product of cronyism. As a result of the controversy, Zappone later declined to take up the role. In September, Coveney admitted that he had deleted texts from his phone in relation to the Zappone affair. Coveney gave a number of reasons for deleting the texts, including that he had deleted them for more storage space, and for security reasons as his phone had previously been "hacked". Coveney's explanations were criticised by many members of the Dáil, including by members of government coalition members Fianna Fáil. Senator Catherine Ardagh of Fianna Fáil stated it "beggars belief that important text messages related to work matters would be deleted" while Fianna Fáil TD James Lawless said "Modern phones have ample storage without having to frequently delete. I would also question to what extent is there an obligation on those subject to Freedom of Information to retain such information".

On 15 September, upon the return of the Dáil from a summer recess, a motion of no confidence was brought forward by Sinn Féin against Coveney as a direct result of the Zappone appointment and his subsequent handling of the affair in the aftermath of the details becoming public. Coveney survived the motion 92 votes to 59, with the support of the government parties, while Independent TDs generally sided with the government on the vote as well.

=== Minister for Enterprise, Trade and Employment: 2022–2024 ===
On 17 December 2022, Varadkar succeeded Martin as Taoiseach, with Martin becoming Minister for Foreign Affairs, and Coveney was appointed Minister for Enterprise, Trade and Employment. On 2 April 2024, shortly after the election of Simon Harris as Fine Gael leader, Coveney announced that he would not seek to be appointed to the next cabinet.

On 10 July 2024, Coveney announced that he would not contest the next general election.

==== Appointment of Paul Hyde to state board ====
In August 2023, online news website The Ditch reported that Coveney exceeded the legal timeframe for making an appointment to the Marine Institute before appointing Paul Hyde to the role in May 2012. Coveney and Hyde had previously co-owned a yacht. Hyde was sentenced in June 2023 to two months' imprisonment for submitting false declarations of interest to An Bord Pleanála while serving as its deputy chairperson.

== Personal life ==
Coveney married his long-time girlfriend Ruth Furney, an IDA Ireland employee, in July 2008. They have three daughters and live in Carrigaline in Cork.

== Honors and Awards ==
Officer of the Order of Legion of Honour

== See also ==
- Families in the Oireachtas

Political offices
Preceded by Brendan Smith	Minister for Agriculture, Food and the Marine; 2011–2016	Succeeded by Michael Creed
Preceded by Enda Kenny	Minister for Defence; 2014–2016	Succeeded by Enda Kenny
Preceded by Alan Kelly as Minister for the Environment, Community and Local Government	Minister for Housing, Planning, Community and Local Government; 2016–2017	Succeeded by Eoghan Murphy as Minister for Housing, Planning and Local Government
Preceded by Frances Fitzgerald	Tánaiste; 2017–2020	Succeeded by Leo Varadkar
Preceded by Charles Flanagan	Minister for Foreign Affairs; 2017–2022	Succeeded by Micheál Martin
Preceded by Leo Varadkar	Minister for Defence; 2020–2022	Succeeded by Micheál Martin
Preceded by Leo Varadkar	Minister for Enterprise, Trade and Employment; 2022–2024	Succeeded by Peter Burke
Party political offices
Preceded by James Reilly	Deputy leader of Fine Gael; 2017–2024	Succeeded by Heather Humphreys

Dáil	Election	Deputy (Party)	Deputy (Party)	Deputy (Party)	Deputy (Party)	Deputy (Party)
22nd	1981	Eileen Desmond (Lab)	Gene Fitzgerald (FF)	Pearse Wyse (FF)	Hugh Coveney (FG)	Peter Barry (FG)
23rd	1982 (Feb)	Eileen Desmond (Lab)	Gene Fitzgerald (FF)	Pearse Wyse (FF)	Jim Corr (FG)	Peter Barry (FG)
24th	1982 (Nov)	Eileen Desmond (Lab)	Gene Fitzgerald (FF)	Pearse Wyse (FF)	Hugh Coveney (FG)	Peter Barry (FG)
25th	1987	Toddy O'Sullivan (Lab)	John Dennehy (FF)	Batt O'Keeffe (FF)	Pearse Wyse (PDs)	Peter Barry (FG)
26th	1989	Toddy O'Sullivan (Lab)	John Dennehy (FF)	Micheál Martin (FF)	Pearse Wyse (PDs)	Peter Barry (FG)
27th	1992	Toddy O'Sullivan (Lab)	Batt O'Keeffe (FF)	Micheál Martin (FF)	Pat Cox (PDs)	Peter Barry (FG)
27th	1994 by-election	Toddy O'Sullivan (Lab)	Batt O'Keeffe (FF)	Micheál Martin (FF)	Hugh Coveney (FG)	Peter Barry (FG)
28th	1997	John Dennehy (FF)	Batt O'Keeffe (FF)	Micheál Martin (FF)	Hugh Coveney (FG)	Deirdre Clune (FG)
28th	1998 by-election	John Dennehy (FF)	Batt O'Keeffe (FF)	Micheál Martin (FF)	Simon Coveney (FG)	Deirdre Clune (FG)
29th	2002	John Dennehy (FF)	Batt O'Keeffe (FF)	Micheál Martin (FF)	Simon Coveney (FG)	Dan Boyle (GP)
30th	2007	Ciarán Lynch (Lab)	Michael McGrath (FF)	Micheál Martin (FF)	Simon Coveney (FG)	Deirdre Clune (FG)
31st	2011	Ciarán Lynch (Lab)	Michael McGrath (FF)	Micheál Martin (FF)	Simon Coveney (FG)	Jerry Buttimer (FG)
32nd	2016	Donnchadh Ó Laoghaire (SF)	Michael McGrath (FF)	Micheál Martin (FF)	Simon Coveney (FG)	4 seats 2016–2024
33rd	2020	Donnchadh Ó Laoghaire (SF)	Michael McGrath (FF)	Micheál Martin (FF)	Simon Coveney (FG)	4 seats 2016–2024
34th	2024	Donnchadh Ó Laoghaire (SF)	Séamus McGrath (FF)	Micheál Martin (FF)	Jerry Buttimer (FG)	Pádraig Rice (SD)
