= 2017 Fine Gael leadership election =

Irish political party leadership contest

- 29 May – 2 June 2017
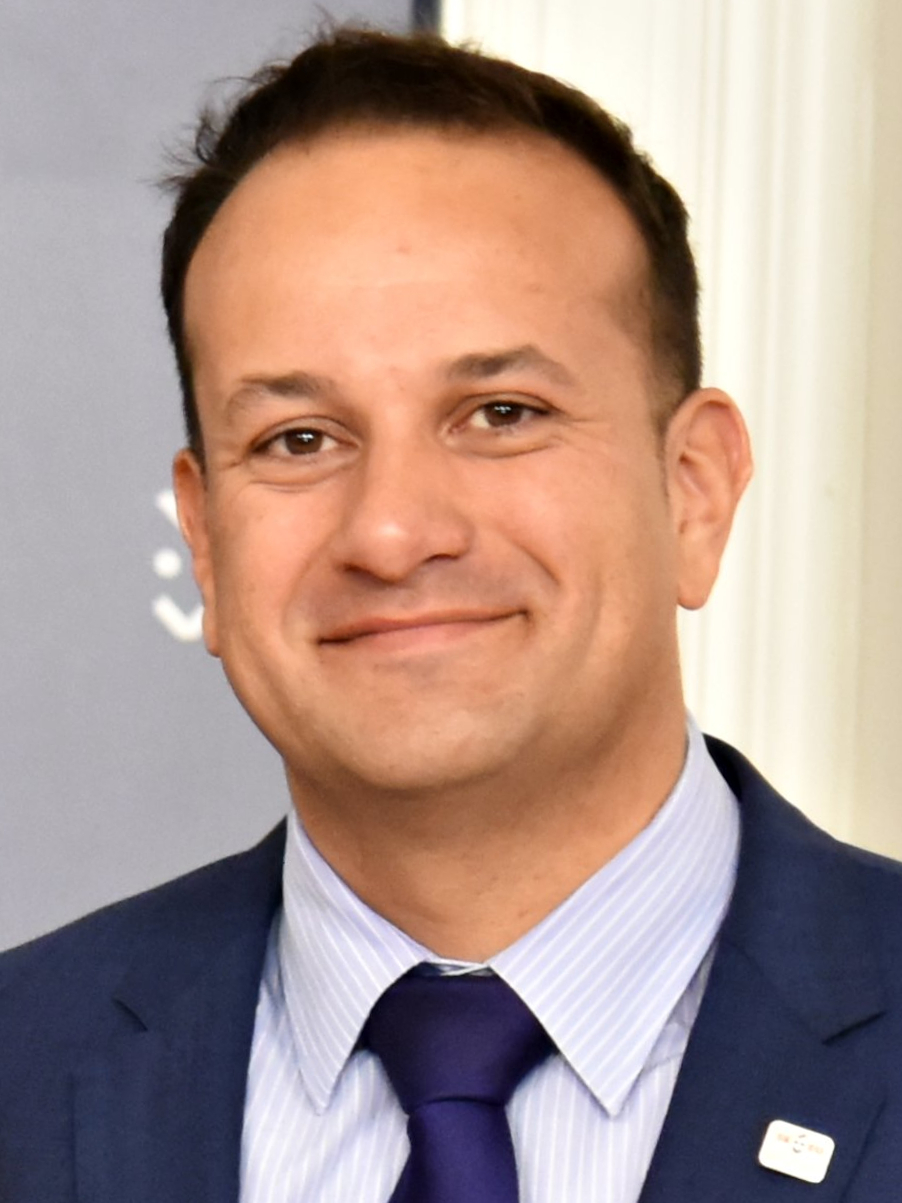

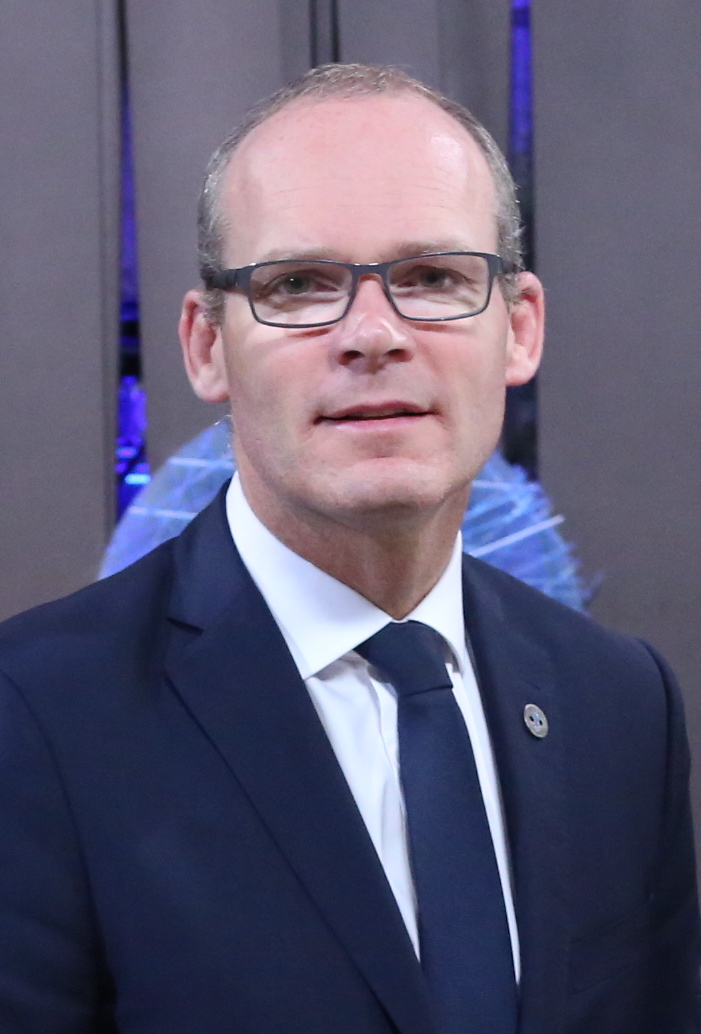
Candidate	Leo Varadkar	Simon Coveney
Electoral College	59.6%	40.4%
Party Membership	3,772 (8.7%)	7,051 (16.3%)
Local Representatives	123 (5.5%)	100 (4.5%)
Parliamentary Party	51 (45.4%)	22 (19.6%)
Leader before election
Enda Kenny
Elected Leader
Leo Varadkar

The 2017 Fine Gael leadership election was triggered in May 2017, when Enda Kenny resigned as leader of Fine Gael. Voting began by members of Fine Gael and Young Fine Gael on 29 May 2017. On 2 June Leo Varadkar was announced as the victor, beating rival Simon Coveney. With Fine Gael being the governing party at the time, this election effectively selected a new Taoiseach for Ireland.

The electoral system was an electoral college of the members of the Fine Gael party, Fine Gael councillors and Fine Gael parliamentary party members. The result was announced on 2 June 2017 when, at a special meeting, the parliamentary party cast their votes. Varadkar became Fine Gael leader immediately upon the announcement of the result, but did not immediately assume the office of Taoiseach. On 13 June at a Fine Gael parliamentary party meeting, he announced that the runner up Simon Coveney would be appointed the deputy leader of the party.

Varadkar was appointed by the President to the office of Taoiseach following his nomination by a vote in Dáil Éireann on 14 June. He became Ireland's youngest Taoiseach, as well as the first who is openly gay. Varadkar is mixed-race and is the first person of Indian-origin to serve in the role of Taoiseach.

== Background ==
Enda Kenny has been Fine Gael leader since 2002, being first Leader of the Opposition, and then Taoiseach following the 2011 general election. The 2016 general election saw Fine Gael lose seats, and its Labour Party coalition partners substantially diminished. Despite these losses, Kenny was unexpectedly able to form a new minority coalition government. Kenny was weakened by criticisms of his handling Garda whistleblower scandal, and—according to an analysis by RTÉ.ie—was an electoral liability to his party at a time when an election could be imminent leading to calls for him to step down.

On 17 May 2017, Kenny announced his intention to step down as party leader, effective at midnight. He requested that the party conclude the election of his successor by 2 June and said that he would step down as Taoiseach shortly thereafter.

== Candidates ==
- Simon Coveney, TD for Cork South-Central, Minister for Housing, Planning, Community and Local Government
- Leo Varadkar, TD for Dublin West, Minister for Social Protection

=== Declined to be candidates ===
- Richard Bruton, TD for Dublin Bay North, Minister for Education and Skills
- Paschal Donohoe, TD for Dublin Central, Minister for Public Expenditure and Reform
- Simon Harris, TD for Wicklow, Minister for Health
- Frances Fitzgerald, TD for Dublin Mid-West, Tánaiste and Minister for Justice and Equality

== Electoral process ==
Rule 49 of Fine Gael's Constitution and Rules state that a leadership contest is decided by an electoral college. These rules were brought in to effect in 2002 after Enda Kenny assumed the leadership, and came about as a result of a motion put forward by Leo Varadkar. This means that this was the first Fine Gael election where the electoral college was in effect. The electoral votes are allocated:

- 65% to the Fine Gael parliamentary party (TDs, Senators and MEPs);
- 25% to ordinary Fine Gael members, including Young Fine Gael;
- 10% to Fine Gael local representatives (city and county councillors and members of Údarás na Gaeltachta).

At the time of the vote the parliamentary party consisted of 73 members (50 TDs, 19 Senators and 4 MEPs). There were about 21,000 party members and Fine Gael had 235 local representatives: 232 councillors and 3 Údarás na Gaeltachta members.

Candidates required signatures of 10% of the parliamentary party, i.e. eight signatures.

Party members had to be affiliated for at least two years to be eligible to vote.

== Endorsements ==
Leo Varadkar received the endorsement of:

- 33 TDs including: Pat Breen; Richard Bruton; Colm Brophy; Peter Burke; Catherine Byrne; Ciarán Cannon; Joe Carey; Jim Daly; Michael D'Arcy; John Deasy; Pat Deering; Regina Doherty; Paschal Donohoe; Andrew Doyle; Charles Flanagan; Alan Farrell; Frances Fitzgerald; Brendan Griffin; Heather Humphreys; Paul Kehoe; Sean Kyne; Josepha Madigan; Helen McEntee; Joe McHugh; Tony McLoughlin; Eoghan Murphy; Tom Neville; Fergus O'Dowd; Mary Mitchell O'Connor; Patrick O'Donovan; John Paul Phelan; Michael Ring; Noel Rock; and the candidate himself
- 11 Senators including: Paddy Burke; Ray Butler; Maria Byrne; Martin Conway; Frank Feighan; Maura Hopkins; Michelle Mulherin; Catherine Noone; Kieran O'Donnell; Joe O'Reilly; Neale Richmond.
- 1 MEP: Brian Hayes.
- 108 Councillors.

Simon Coveney received the endorsement of:

- 10 TDs including: Maira Bailey; Seán Barrett; Marcella Corcoran Kennedy; Damien English; Peter Fitzpatrick; Simon Harris; Dara Murphy; Hildegarde Naughton; Kate O'Connell; David Stanton; and the candidate himself.
- 8 Senators including: Colm Burke; Jerry Buttimer; Paudie Coffey; Paul Coghlan; Tim Lombard; John O'Mahony; Gabrielle McFadden; James Reilly.
- 2 MEPs including: Deirdre Clune; Mairead McGuinness.
- 65 Councillors.

Undeclared parliamentary members prior to the election included:

- 5 TDs including: Michael Creed; Bernard Durkan; Martin Heydon; Enda Kenny; Michael Noonan.
- 1 MEP: Seán Kelly.
- 59 Councillors.

Because of Varadkar's commanding lead in support among parliamentarians he was considered the strong favourite to win.

== Timetable ==
The following are the key dates in the leadership election:

- 17 May: resignation of Enda Kenny, TD as leader;
- 18 May: meeting of national executive to outline timetable and process;
- 20 May: closing of nominations for leader at 5pm;
- 25 May: first hustings: Red Cow Hotel, Dublin;
- 26 May: second hustings: Barrow Centre, IT Carlow;
- 27 May: third hustings: Shearwater Hotel, Ballinasloe, County Galway;
- 28 May: final hustings: Clayton Hotel, Silver Springs, Cork;
- 29 May to 1 June: voting by members and councilors at 26 polling stations;
- 2 June: voting by parliamentary party; all votes to be verified and counted at a National Counting Centre in Dublin; result to be announced by the National Returning Officer, Gerry O'Connell.

== Result ==
The Parliamentary Party accounts for 65% of the vote, ordinary Fine Gael members account for 25%, with the remaining 10% of votes allocated to Fine Gael local representatives.

Although Coveney won the members' vote by a 2:1 margin, Varadkar's strong support with the Parliamentary Party secured him a commanding victory in the electoral college.

Candidate	Parliamentary Party		Members		Local public representatives		Total	
Candidate	Votes	%	Votes	%	Votes	%	Votes (unweighted)	Result (weighted)
Leo Varadkar	51	69.86%	3,772	34.85%	123	55.16%	3,946	59.64%
Simon Coveney	22	30.14%	7,051	65.15%	100	44.84%	7,173	40.36%
Total	73	100%	10,823	100%	223	100%	11,119	100%

== See also ==
- July–September 2022 Conservative Party leadership election
