= 1999 South Dublin County Council election =

Part of the 1999 Irish local elections

← 1991	10 June 1999	2004 →

All 26 seats to South Dublin County Council
	First party	Second party	Third party
Party	Fianna Fáil	Labour	Fine Gael
Seats won	8	7	3
Seat change	+1	+3	-3
	Fourth party	Fifth party	Sixth party
Party	Progressive Democrats	Sinn Féin	Green
Seats won	2	2	1
Seat change	-2	+2	0
	Seventh party	Eighth party
Party	Independent	Workers' Party
Seats won	3	0
Seat change	+2	-3
- Map showing the area of South Dublin County Council
Council control after election
TBD

An election to South Dublin County Council took place on 10 June 1999 as part of that year's Irish local elections. 26 councillors were elected from five local electoral areas for a five-year term of office on the system of proportional representation by means of the single transferable vote (PR-STV).

== Results by party ==
Party	Seats	±	First Pref. votes	FPv%	±%
Fianna Fáil	8	+1	16,170	29.76	
Labour	7	+3	8,635	15.89	
Fine Gael	3	-3	8,667	15.95	
Progressive Democrats	2	-2	4,678	8.61	
Sinn Féin	2	+2	4,226	7.78	
Green	1	0	3,135	5.77	
Independent	3	+2	6,631	12.20	
Workers' Party	0	-3	806	1.48	
Totals	26	0	54,339	100.00	—

== Results by local electoral area ==
=== Clondalkin ===
Clondalkin - 5 seats
Party	Candidate	FPv%	Count							
Party	Candidate	FPv%	1	2	3	4	5	6	7	8
Fine Gael	Senator Therese Ridge*	17.74	1,401							
Fianna Fáil	John Curran	14.86	1,174	1,183	1,188	1,194	1,211	1,225	1,359	
Progressive Democrats	Colm Tyndall*	14.85	1,173	1,195	1,198	1,214	1,254	1,275	1,350	
Independent	Colm McGrath*	12.80	1,011	1,023	1,032	1,056	1,098	1,126	1,191	1,362
Labour	Robert Dowds	9.67	764	778	795	817	881	937	967	1,070
Sinn Féin	John McCann	7.87	622	627	642	664	696	790	801	919
Fianna Fáil	Liam Lawlor TD	6.94	611	617	618	628	635	669	721	
Fianna Fáil	Sheila O'Brien	4.77	377	382	387	394	397	401		
Workers' Party	Mick Finnegan	3.38	267	269	277	288	320			
Green	Ger Doherty	3.08	243	248	260	277				
Independent	James O'Connor	1.68	133	135	167					
Independent	Peter Greene	1.56	123	125						
Electorate: 28,256 Valid: 7,899 (27.96%) Spoilt: 99 Quota: 1,317 Turnout: 7,998 (28.31%)

=== Lucan ===
Lucan - 4 seats
Party	Candidate	FPv%	Count						
Party	Candidate	FPv%	1	2	3	4	5	6	7
Green	Paul Gogarty	14.73	1,238	1,287	1,425	1,485	1,722		
Labour	Joanna Tuffy	14.59	1,226	1,284	1,411	1,485	1,917		
Independent	Guss O'Connell*	14.36	1,207	1,224	1,285	1,328	1,412	1,473	1,483
Independent	Derek Keating	13.24	1,113	1,138	1,216	1,264	1,427	1,531	1,563
Fine Gael	Peter Brady*	12.49	1,050	1,098	1,161	1,261			
Fianna Fáil	Deirdre Doherty-Ryan	11.45	962	1,000	1,019	1,472	1,652	1,723	
Fianna Fáil	Finbarr Hanrahan*	9.25	777	805	829				
Workers' Party	Anne Finnegan	6.41	539	557					
Progressive Democrats	Rose Dunne	3.47	292						
Electorate: 26,303 Valid: 8,404 (31.95%) Spoilt: 83 Quota: 1,681 Turnout: 8,487 (32.27%)

=== Tallaght Central ===
Tallaght Central - 5 seats
Party	Candidate	FPv%	Count									
Party	Candidate	FPv%	1	2	3	4	5	6	7	8	9	10
Fianna Fáil	Charlie O'Connor*	16.84	1,521									
Sinn Féin	Mark Daly	14.34	1,295	1,308	1,360	1,404	1,440	1,501	1,504	1,506		
Fine Gael	Brian Hayes TD*	13.01	1,175	1,179	1,230	1,464	1,549					
Socialist Party	Mick Murphy	8.34	753	765	803	813	826	876	877	879	928	
Labour	Eamonn Maloney	7.92	715	722	743	781	798	891	891	892	1,079	1,245
Labour	Don Tipping*	8.37	666	674	703	737	793	906	925	927	1,129	1,406
Labour	Denis Mackin	6.58	594	598	618	625	643	667	671	671		
Fianna Fáil	Margaret Farrell*	5.97	539	550	576	596	833	909	925	933	1,027	1,166
Fianna Fáil	Pat Somers	5.28	477	481	488	502						
Progressive Democrats	Joe Neville*	5.22	471	479	505	534	535					
Fine Gael	Karen Warren	4.65	420	426	451							
Green	Mary Bowers	3.37	304	324								
Independent	Ray Kelly	1.12	101									
Electorate: 29,354 Valid: 9,031 (30.77%) Spoilt: 109 Quota: 1,506 Turnout: 9,140 (31.14%)

=== Tallaght Oldbawn ===
Tallaght Oldbawn - 5 seats
Party	Candidate	FPv%	Count								
Party	Candidate	FPv%	1	2	3	4	5	6	7	8	9
Fianna Fáil	John Hannon*	18.72	1,638								
Sinn Féin	Seán Crowe	17.69	1,548								
Labour	Mick Billane*	13.27	1,161	1,165	1,184	1,213	1,251	1,297	1,343	1,389	1,488
Labour	Pat Rabbitte	9.91	867	890	904	929	947	1,001	1,111	1,205	1,499
Progressive Democrats	Catherine Quinn*	9.60	840	853	856	877	893	911	959	1,028	1,139
Fianna Fáil	Jim Daly	9.24	809	866	877	893	957	1,059	1,088	1,138	1,213
Fine Gael	Paul Ringland	5.51	482	497	501	509	516	527	578	786	
Fine Gael	Ian Mitchell	5.14	450	459	463	474	501	516	536		
Green	Patrick Quinn	3.55	311	326	336	364	380	396			
Fianna Fáil	Frank Godfrey	2.91	255	269	280	307	351				
Fianna Fáil	Joe McCormac	2.40	210	237	241	245					
Independent	Marie Hennessy	2.07	181	183	192						
Electorate: 27,486 Valid: 8,752 (31.84%) Spoilt: 120 Quota: 1,459 Turnout: 8,872 (32.28%)

=== Terenure-Rathfarnam ===
Terenure-Rathfarnam - 7 seats
Party	Candidate	FPv%	Count											
Party	Candidate	FPv%	1	2	3	4	5	6	7	8	9	10	11	12
Fianna Fáil	Senator Ann Ormonde*	12.16	2,463	2,469	2,496	2,581								
Fine Gael	Stanley Laing*	11.55	2,340	2,348	2,486	2,508	2,512	2,534						
Fianna Fáil	John Lahart	9.77	1,978	1,985	1,988	2,011	2,024	2,048	2,160	2,209	2,314	2,339	2,423	2,615
Progressive Democrats	Cáit Keane*	9.39	1,902	1,915	1,939	1,960	1,967	1,998	2,053	2,113	2,152	2,166	2,191	2,441
Fianna Fáil	Máire Ardagh	8.45	1,711	1,714	1,719	1,727	1,731	1,752	2,094	2,117	2,206	2,213	2,228	2,290
Independent	Sheila Donnelly	8.04	1,629	1,715	1,731	1,740	1,741	1,760	1,770	1,812	1,870	2,781		
Labour	Éamonn Walsh*	7.32	1,483	1,485	1,496	1,629	1,632	1,756	1,844	2,191	2,364	2,377	2,402	2,650
Green	Andrew Shorten*	5.13	1,039	1,050	1,070	1,136	1,140	1,267	1,285	1,362	1,579	1,607	1,659	1,816
Independent	Niall Murray	4.74	960	977	985	996	998	1,013	1,016	1,025	1,061			
Fine Gael	Jane Lehane	4.23	857	860	1,062	1,093	1,097	1,107	1,118	1,192	1,214	1,236	1,284	
Sinn Féin	Una Sloan	3.76	761	761	762	770	772	890	910	938				
Fianna Fáil	Maria Bohan	3.30	668	669	670	673	675	698						
Socialist Party	Lisa Maher	3.15	638	641	643	653	654							
Labour	Paddy Cosgrave	2.96	600	607	611	723	725	770	778					
Labour	Tom Rowan	2.76	559	561	582									
Fine Gael	Honor O'Connor	2.43	492	493										
Independent	Gerard Dolan	0.85	173											
Electorate: 51,423 Valid: 20,253 (39.39%) Spoilt: 240 Quota: 2,532 Turnout: 20,493 (39.85%)
