= 2014 South Dublin County Council election =

Part of the 2014 Irish local elections

← 2009	23 May 2014	2019 →

All 40 seats on South Dublin County Council 21 seats needed for a majority
	First party	Second party	Third party
Party	Sinn Féin	Fine Gael	Fianna Fáil
Seats won	9	7	5
Seat change	▲6	▼1	▲1
	Fourth party	Fifth party	Sixth party
Party	Labour	People Before Profit	Anti-Austerity Alliance
Seats won	4	3	3
Seat change	▼5	▲2	▲3
	Seventh party	Eighth party
Party	Green	Independent
Seats won	1	8
Seat change	▲1	▲7
- Area of South Dublin County Council

An election to all 40 seats on South Dublin County Council took place on 23 May 2014 as part of the 2014 Irish local elections, an increase from 26 seats at the 2009 election. South Dublin was divided into six local electoral areas (LEAs) to elect councillors for a five-year term of office on the electoral system of proportional representation by means of the single transferable vote (PR-STV).

== Increase in seats ==
Under the Local Government Act 2001, South Dublin County Council had been allocated 26 seats. In November 2012, Phil Hogan, the Minister for the Environment, Community and Local Government, appointed a Local Electoral Area Boundary Committee to review the allocation of seats across local authorities. In the case of South Dublin County Council, it recommended an increase to 40 seats. This was implemented by the Local Government Reform Act 2014.

== Overview of results ==
Sinn Féin emerged as the largest party after the local elections with 9 seats and 6 gains in total. The party won 2 seats in each of Clondalkin and the 2 Tallaght LEAs. Fine Gael retained second place but lost 1 seat overall to emerge with 7 seats. While the party won 2 seats in each of Clondalkin, Lucan and Rathfarnham she won no seat in either Tallaght LEA. Fianna Fáil gained 1 seat to win 5 seats overall, in the Lucan LEA, the first time they won a seat there since 2004, but were left without representation in Tallaght South. Labour lost 5 seats, to emerge with 4 overall, and was left without representation in Lucan and Rathfarnham. Both People Before Profit and the Anti-Austerity Alliance secured 3 seats each. The Green Party also gained 1 seat in Rathfarnham. Independents were also among the biggest winners on the council with 8 seats and 7 gains in total.

== Results by party ==
Party	Seats	±	1st pref	FPv%
Sinn Féin	9	+6	18,411	23.96
Fine Gael	7	-1	13,853	18.03
Fianna Fáil	5	+1	10,274	13.37
Labour	4	-5	7,847	10.21
People Before Profit	3	+2	3,630	4.72
Anti-Austerity Alliance	3	+3	3,537	4.60
Green	1	+1	1,667	2.17
Workers' Party	0	0	940	1.22
Direct Democracy	0	0	280	0.36
Communist	0	0	143	0.19
Independent	8	+7	16,246	21.15
Total	40	+14	76,828	100.00

== Results by local electoral area ==
*: Outgoing councillor.

=== Clondalkin ===
Clondalkin: 8 seats
Party	Candidate	FPv%	Count							
Party	Candidate	FPv%	1	2	3	4	5	6	7	8
Sinn Féin	Eoin Ó Broin	21.19	2,992							
Sinn Féin	Jonathan Graham	16.33	2,306							
Fianna Fáil	Trevor Gilligan	13.71	1,935							
People Before Profit	Gino Kenny	12.01	1,696							
Independent	Francis Timmons	4.83	682	1,122	1,282	1,356	1,387	1,477	1,886	
Labour	Breeda Bonner	7.70	1,087	1,203	1,270	1,353	1,361	1,533	1,562	1,590
Fine Gael	Kenny Egan	7.19	1,015	1,157	1,200	1,282	1,291	1,338	1,392	1,407
Fine Gael	Emer Higgins	8.45	1,193	1,241	1,262	1,327	1,330	1,356	1,366	1,388
Workers' Party	Lorraine Hennessy	3.07	433	693	853	880	910	1,029	1,143	1,309
Independent	Matthew McDonagh	2.82	398	637	866	867	903	987		
Labour	Ken Kinsella	1.68	237	276	291	315	319			
Communist	Paul Doran	1.01	143	282	324	334	340			
Electorate: 35,616 Valid: 14,117 (39.64%) Spoilt: 263 Quota: 1,569 Turnout: 14,380 (40.38%)

=== Lucan ===
Lucan: 8 seats
Party	Candidate	FPv%	Count													
Party	Candidate	FPv%	1	2	3	4	5	6	7	8	9	10	11	12	13	14
Sinn Féin	Danny O'Brien	12.57	1,762													
Fine Gael	William Lavelle	12.49	1,751													
Independent	Guss O'Connell	10.50	1,471	1,496	1,503	1,506	1,513	1,522	1,561							
Independent	Paul Gogarty	8.71	1,221	1,241	1,261	1,272	1,279	1,309	1,320	1,369	1,414	1,488	1,565			
People Before Profit	Ruth Nolan	5.02	704	755	760	763	769	791	798	827	841	999	1,031	1,123	1,285	1,488
Fine Gael	Vicki Casserly	6.13	859	863	923	924	938	948	1,041	1,083	1,101	1,142	1,203	1,242	1,304	1,351
Fianna Fáil	Ed O'Brien	5.06	709	716	725	727	735	743	749	757	1,076	1,101	1,144	1,162	1,250	1,306
Independent	Liona O'Toole	5.51	772	786	798	800	804	810	818	836	852	892	918	995	1,137	1,263
Labour	Caitriona Jones	3.60	505	509	527	530	576	581	595	637	649	669	951	994	1,048	1,112
Independent	Tony Stafford	4.72	661	672	672	673	676	681	698	705	720	735	745	943	993	
Independent	Jim Doyle	3.55	497	506	511	534	536	598	602	627	651	738	767	819		
Independent	Alan Hayes	4.16	583	592	595	596	598	605	618	635	645	665	676			
Labour	Eamon Tuffy	3.62	507	512	531	531	548	560	580	597	617	654				
Workers' Party	Mick Finnegan	3.62	507	530	533	535	537	567	569	585	594					
Fianna Fáil	Caitríona McClean	3.66	513	517	523	524	525	531	537	550						
Independent	Patrick Akpoveta	1.96	275	281	284	289	326	336	337							
Fine Gael	Gerry Kennedy	1.66	233	234	254	254	256	260								
Independent	Michael Farrelly	1.71	239	243	244	252	253									
Independent	Hussain Zahid	1.29	181	184	186	187										
Independent	Ciaran Byrne	0.46	65	69	69											
Electorate: 33,243 Valid: 14,015 (41.93%) Spoilt: 168 Quota: 1,558 Turnout: 14,183 (42.43%)

=== Rathfarnham ===
Rathfarnham: 6 seats
Party	Candidate	FPv%	Count					
Party	Candidate	FPv%	1	2	3	4	5	6
Fianna Fáil	John Lahart	15.95	1,972					
Fine Gael	Anne-Marie Dermody	13.22	1,634	1,649	1,715	1,788		
Sinn Féin	Sarah Holland	13.06	1,614	1,621	1,644	1,740	1,768	
Independent	Deirdre O'Donovan	12.27	1,517	1,533	1,592	1,731	1,840	
Fine Gael	Paula Donovan	8.14	1,006	1,015	1,043	1,102	1,547	1,637
Green	Francis Noel Duffy	7.64	944	959	992	1,130	1,198	1,477
People Before Profit	John Flanagan	6.52	806	809	830	886	907	
Labour	Paddy Cosgrave	6.50	804	817	1,129	1,180	1,268	1,370
Fine Gael	Alan Gallagher	6.26	774	787	818	862		
Fianna Fáil	Emma Murphy	5.54	685	793	807			
Labour	Aideen Carberry	4.91	607	613				
Electorate: 30,375 Valid: 12,363 (40.70%) Spoilt: 127 Quota: 1,767 Turnout: 12,490 (41.12%)

=== Tallaght Central ===
Tallaght Central: 6 seats
Party	Candidate	FPv%	Count									
Party	Candidate	FPv%	1	2	3	4	5	6	7	8	9	10
Sinn Féin	Máire Devine	24.45	2,874									
Fianna Fáil	Charlie O'Connor	13.74	1,615	1,744								
Sinn Féin	Brendan Ferron	7.70	905	1,642	1,663	1,678	1,705					
Anti-Austerity Alliance	Mick Murphy	12.11	1,424	1,506	1,515	1,533	1,586	1,620	1,625	1,651	1,808	
Anti-Austerity Alliance	Kieran Mahon	5.30	623	654	656	661	701	719	720	748	1,189	1,512
Labour	Mick Duff	8.35	982	1,022	1,026	1,168	1,191	1,224	1,225	1,353	1,381	1,495
Fine Gael	Karen Warren	5.38	632	642	647	687	697	754	754	1,065	1,078	1,153
Independent	Declan Burke	4.46	524	556	557	581	715	764	772	824	872	
Anti-Austerity Alliance	Eddie Ericksson	4.98	585	663	665	675	694	712	713	744		
Fine Gael	Gay Kelly	5.14	604	615	619	632	650	693	693			
Fianna Fáil	Valerie Gaynor	2.95	347	361	369	382	385					
Independent	Ray Kelly	2.88	339	354	359	362						
Labour	Kemi Adenekan	2.56	301	316	319							
Electorate: 26,285 Valid: 11,755 (44.72%) Spoilt: 186 Quota: 1,680 Turnout: 11,941 (45.43%)

=== Tallaght South ===
Tallaght South: 6 seats
Party	Candidate	FPv%	Count						
Party	Candidate	FPv%	1	2	3	4	5	6	7
Sinn Féin	Cathal King	31.21	2,449						
Sinn Féin	Louise Dunne	20.05	1,573						
Labour	Martina Genockey	9.43	740	861	905	1,003	1,096	1,420	
Anti-Austerity Alliance	Brian Leech	6.16	483	804	886	911	956	994	1,008
People Before Profit	Nicky Coules	5.40	424	704	804	828	884	918	958
Independent	Dermot Richardson	4.72	370	537	581	707	781	870	927
Anti-Austerity Alliance	Phil Foster	5.38	422	643	740	767	810	850	871
Fine Gael	David Yeates	7.15	561	596	608	656	772		
Fianna Fáil	Emmett Hegarty	6.76	530	597	633	654			
Labour	Eugene Ryan	2.56	201	254	265				
Independent	Frank O'Gorman	1.19	93	156	182				
Electorate: 25,653 Valid: 7,846 (30.59%) Spoilt: 167 Quota: 1,121 Turnout: 8,013 (31.24%)

=== Templeogue–Terenure ===
Templeogue–Terenure: 6 seats
Party	Candidate	FPv%	Count									
Party	Candidate	FPv%	1	2	3	4	5	6	7	8	9	10
Independent	Dermot Looney	16.89	2,826									
Independent	Ronan McMahon	13.74	2,299	2,386	2,427							
Sinn Féin	Fintan Warfield	11.57	1,936	2,016	2,025	2,094	2,121	2,167	2,227	2,292	2,623	
Labour	Pamela Kearns	8.52	1,426	1,454	1,472	1,484	1,679	1,796	2,002	2,076	2,248	2,282
Fine Gael	Colm Brophy	9.28	1,552	1,562	1,567	1,572	1,689	1,895	1,981	2,027	2,115	2,134
Fianna Fáil	Paul Foley	6.90	1,155	1,168	1,180	1,189	1,202	1,232	1,283	1,834	1,951	1,988
Fine Gael	Brian Lawlor	8.22	1,375	1,380	1,383	1,384	1,438	1,542	1,599	1,636	1,855	1,882
Independent	Shane Conneely	6.47	1,082	1,115	1,158	1,257	1,315	1,338	1,485	1,537		
Fianna Fáil	Eamonn Walsh	4.86	813	844	848	862	868	907	992			
Green	Suzanne McEneaney	4.32	723	750	759	782	812	859				
Fine Gael	Siobhán Butler	3.97	664	731	735	745	764					
Labour	Chris Bond	2.69	450	467	467	480						
Direct Democracy	Neville Bradley	1.67	280	300	309							
Independent	Paddy Henegan	0.90	151	168								
Electorate: 33,746 Valid: 16,732 (49.58%) Spoilt: 217 Quota: 2,391 Turnout: 16,949 (50.23%)

== Changes ==
=== Co-options ===
Party	Outgoing	LEA	Reason	Date	Co-optee
Sinn Féin	Eoin O'Broin	Clondalkin	Elected to the 32nd Dáil at the 2016 general election.	14 March 2016	Mark Ward
Fianna Fáil	John Lahart	Rathfarnham	Elected to the 32nd Dáil at the 2016 general election.	14 March 2016	Emma Murphy
Fine Gael	Colm Brophy	Templeogue-Terenure	Elected to the 32nd Dáil at the 2016 general election.	14 March 2016	Brian Lawlor
People Before Profit	Gino Kenny	Clondalkin	Elected to the 32nd Dáil at the 2016 general election.	20 April 2016	Madeleine Johansson
Sinn Féin	Máire Devine	Tallaght Central	Elected to 25th Seanad at the 2016 Seanad election.	25 April 2016	Cora McCann
Sinn Féin	Fintan Warfield	Templeogue-Terenure	Elected to 25th Seanad at the 2016 Seanad election.	May 2016	Enda Fanning
Fine Gael	Anne-Marie Dermody	Rathfarnham	Resigned to prioritise work as a solicitor.	14 November 2017	Conor McMahon
People Before Profit	Nicky Coules	Tallaght South	Health Issues.	14 November 2017	Emma Hendrick
Sinn Féin	Enda Fanning	Templeogue-Terenure	Resignation.	10 October 2017	Robert Russell

=== Changes in affiliation ===
Name	LEA	Elected as	New affiliation	Date
Ronan McMahon	Templeogue-Terenure	Independent	Renua	13 March 2015
Dermot Richardson	Tallaght South	Independent	Sinn Féin	20 April 2016
Dermot Looney	Templeogue-Terenure	Independent	Social Democrats	8 June 2017
Johnathan Graham	Clondalkin	Sinn Féin	Independent	24 January 2018
Martina Genockey	Tallaght South	Labour	Independent	28 September 2018
Mick Duff	Tallaght Central	Labour	Independent	5 October 2018
Johnathan Graham	Clondalkin	Independent	Fianna Fáil	22 March 2019
Deirdre O'Donovan	Rathfarnham	Independent	Fianna Fáil	22 March 2019
