= 1991 Dublin County Council election in South Dublin =

Part of the 1991 Irish local elections

1991 South Dublin County Council election
- 27 June 1991

26 seats on the council of the electoral county of South Dublin within Dublin County Council
	First party	Second party	Third party
Party	Fianna Fáil	Fine Gael	Labour
Seats won	7	6	4
Seat change	-6	-2	+2
	Fourth party	Fifth party	Sixth party
Party	Progressive Democrats	Workers' Party	Green
Seats won	4	3	1
Seat change	+4	+1	+1
	Seventh party
Party	Independent
Seats won	1
Seat change	0
- Map showing the area of South Dublin County Council
Council control after election
TBD

An election to the council of the electoral county of South Dublin within Dublin County to Dublin County Council took place on 27 June 1991 as part of that year's Irish local elections. 26 councillors were elected for a five-year term of office from five local electoral areas on the system of proportional representation by means of the single transferable vote. It was one of three electoral counties within Dublin County at this election, the others being Fingal and Dún Laoghaire–Rathdown. The term was extended twice, first to 1998, then to 1999.

The electoral county had been established in 1985 as Dublin–Belgard and was renamed South Dublin for these local elections.

From 1 January 1994, on the coming into effect of the Local Government (Dublin) Act 1993, County Dublin was disestablished as an administrative county, and in its place the electoral counties became three new counties. The councillors listed below became the councillors for South Dublin County Council from that date.

== Results by party ==
Party	Seats	±	First Pref. votes	FPv%	±%
Fianna Fáil	7	-6	16,179	29.1	
Fine Gael	6	-2	10,176	18.3	
Labour	4	+2	9,796	17.6	
Progressive Democrats	4	+4	5,080	9.1	
Workers' Party	3	+1	4,842	8.7	
Green	1	+1	3,294	5.9	
Independent	1	0	4,294	7.7	
Totals	26	0	53,634	100.0	—

== Results by local electoral area ==
=== Clondalkin ===
Clondalkin - 3 seats
Party	Candidate	FPv%	Count						
Party	Candidate	FPv%	1	2	3	4	5	6	7
Fine Gael	Therese Ridge*	18.3%	1,378	1,431	1,459	1,497	1,563	1,733	1,883
Progressive Democrats	Colm Tyndall	17.7%	1,332	1,355	1,375	1,447	1,544	1,647	1,863
Fianna Fáil	Colm McGrath*	14.6%	1,104	1,112	1,136	1,257	1,280	1,316	2,027
Fianna Fáil	Catherine Sherwin	13.1%	986	1,004	1,028	1,182	1,229	1,259	
Workers' Party	Donna Conlon	8.9%	671	729	809	813	943	1,292	1,356
Labour	Robert Dowds	8.3%	626	679	711	721	794		
Fianna Fáil	Pat Smyth	5.7%	431	436	441				
Green	Conor Delaney	5.3%	400	436	496	518			
Sinn Féin	Vincent Coffey	4.2%	315	340					
Independent	Maurice Duffy	2.4%	178						
Independent	Maire O'Connor	1.6%	123						
Electorate: 20,425 Valid: 7,544 (36.9%) Spoilt: 63 Quota: 1,887 Turnout: 7,607 (37.2%)

=== Greenhills ===
Greenhills - 4 seats
Party	Candidate	FPv%	Count								
Party	Candidate	FPv%	1	2	3	4	5	6	7	8	9
Labour	Mervyn Taylor TD*	24.1%	1,576								
Workers' Party	Don Tipping*	13.9%	912	966	995	1,020	1,107	1,138	1,306	1,357	
Fine Gael	Michael Keating	11%	720	745	754	875	919	946	1,066	1,126	1,170
Independent	Bob Byrne	9.3%	611	628	645	651	713	736			
Fianna Fáil	Geraldine O'Connor	8.8%	577	584	586	607	626	767	819		
Fianna Fáil	Margaret Farrell	8.1%	525	537	549	555	580	828	943	1,412	
Labour	Denis Mackin	8%	522	634	648	667	737	755	881	1,040	1,089
Fianna Fáil	Michael Hanrahan	7.2%	468	479	505	511	523				
Green	Alison Larkin	4.6%	298	308	345	363					
Fine Gael	Michael O'Brien	3.4%	224	228	228						
Sinn Féin	Dessie Early	2.4%	157	162							
Electorate: 16,819 Valid: 6,540 (38.9%) Spoilt: 50 Quota: 1,319 Turnout: 6,590 (39.2%)

=== Lucan ===
Lucan - 4 seats
Party	Candidate	FPv%	Count										
Party	Candidate	FPv%	1	2	3	4	5	6	7	8	9	10	11
Independent	Guss O'Connell	14.2%	1,406	1,477	1,532	1,649	1,894	2,032					
Fine Gael	Peter Brady	13.5%	1,336	1,346	1,472	1,549	1,587	1,612	1,619	1,775	1,812	1,987	
Fianna Fáil	Finbarr Hanrahan*	11.3%	1,119	1,126	1,145	1,182	1,215	1,440	1,459	1,514	1,607	2,362	
Fianna Fáil	Liam Lawlor TD*	9.1%	905	910	919	934	950	1,110	1,123	1,173	1,246		
Labour	Eamon Tuffy	8.3%	826	829	834	927	1,000	1,026	1,030	1,211	1,263	1,315	1,430
Sinn Féin	John McCann	7.9%	783	789	797	808	815	828	830	919			
Labour	John O'Halloran	7.8%	775	781	795	815	884	898	901	1,058	1,379	1,467	1,553
Workers' Party	Anne Finnegan	6.7%	665	671	677	748	777	799	803				
Fianna Fáil	Deirdre Doherty-Ryan	5.9%	580	591	609	630	675						
Labour	Michael Brennan	5%	497	534	563	598							
Green	Bridin O'Connor	5%	492	512	531								
Fine Gael	Tom Kavanagh	3.1%	311	316									
Independent	Michael Kirwan	2%	200										
Electorate: 20,266 Valid: 9,895 (48.8%) Spoilt: 75 Quota: 1,980 Turnout: 9,970 (49.2%)

=== Rathfarnam ===
Rathfarnam - 4 seats
Party	Candidate	FPv%	Count						
Party	Candidate	FPv%	1	2	3	4	5	6	7
Fianna Fáil	Ann Ormonde*	19%	1,582	1,584	1,601	1,872			
Fine Gael	Alan Shatter TD*	14.3%	1,191	1,202	1,241	1,286	1,303	1,538	1,671
Green	Máire Mullarney	14%	1,163	1,176	1,289	1,313	1,327	1,511	1,877
Fine Gael	Mary Muldoon*	13.96%	1,161	1,166	1,194	1,206	1,213	1,355	1,622
Fianna Fáil	Damien Fee	10.4%	862	884	897	989	1,142	1,223	1,325
Independent	Vincent Kenny	9.1%	760	767	832	842	849	944	
Progressive Democrats	Ronnie McBrien	8.6%	719	721	760	778	788		
Fianna Fáil	Stephen Riney*	5.8%	479	479	485				
Labour	Billy Byrne	2.7%	227	339					
Labour	Graham Corcoran	1.9%	154						
Electorate: 20,175 Valid: 8,318 (41.2%) Spoilt: 35 Quota: 1,664 Turnout: 8,353 (41.4%)

=== Tallaght-Oldbawn ===
Tallaght-Oldbawn - 3 seats
Party	Candidate	FPv%	Count									
Party	Candidate	FPv%	1	2	3	4	5	6	7	8	9	10
Fianna Fáil	John Hannon*	22.3%	1,572	1,579	1,590	1,663	1,684	1,915				
Workers' Party	Pat Rabbitte TD*	13.5%	947	967	980	994	1,066	1,102	1,125	1,255	1,472	1,736
Progressive Democrats	Breda Cass*	12.7%	892	900	916	920	969	998	1,021	1,062	1,131	1,501
Fine Gael	Senator Larry McMahon*	11.2%	789	799	889	912	942	964	988	1,009	1,083	
Labour	Eamonn Maloney	9.5%	667	677	689	703	741	748	756	801		
Labour	Ned Gibbons	9.4%	663	667	673	676	706	762	775	885	1,271	1,415
Sinn Féin	Seán Crowe	5.7%	399	436	438	441	461	480	496			
Fianna Fáil	Jim Barry*	5.5%	389	394	395	430	434					
Green	Malachy Murphy	3.7%	259	271	279	280						
Fianna Fáil	Frank Dwan	2.5%	178	179	179							
Fine Gael	Paul Ringland	2.2%	158	159								
Republican Sinn Féin	Peter Cunningham	1.8%	125									
Electorate: 14,687 Valid: 6,388 (43.5%) Spoilt: 89 Quota: 1,598 Turnout: 6,477 (44.1%)

=== Tallaght-Rathcoole ===
Tallaght-Rathcoole - 3 seats
Party	Candidate	FPv%	Count								
Party	Candidate	FPv%	1	2	3	4	5	6	7	8	9
Workers' Party	Mick Billane	20.3%	1217	1,228	1,264	1,306	1,368	1,488	1,554		
Fianna Fáil	Charlie O'Connor	15.4%	922	987	996	1,019	1,144	1,182	1,216	1,220	1,656
Progressive Democrats	Catherine Quinn	13.1%	785	786	796	889	934	982	1,199	1,208	1,421
Fianna Fáil	Jim Daly*	12.3%	741	757	759	764	783	832	904	914	
Labour	Maria Ingle	11.6%	694	700	712	741	815	886	936	954	1,028
Sinn Féin	Tony Flannery	6.4%	386	390	397	409	429				
Fine Gael	Pat Corcoran	6.4%	384	388	451	463	484	519			
Independent	John O'Mahony	6%	359	363	374	389					
Progressive Democrats	Martin Smith	3.7%	224	226	248						
Fine Gael	Jim Lovett	2.9%	177	178							
Fianna Fáil	Mary Morton	1.9%	114								
Electorate: 15,744 Valid: 6,003 (38.1%) Spoilt: 80 Quota: 1,501 Turnout: 6,083 (38.6%)

=== Terenure ===
Terenure - 5 seats
Party	Candidate	FPv%	Count							
Party	Candidate	FPv%	1	2	3	4	5	6	7	8
Fine Gael	Stanley Laing*	14.4%	1,488	1,503	1,541	1,566	1,585	1,630	1,685	1,768
Labour	Éamonn Walsh	12.4%	1,278	1,382	1,384	1,527	1,625	1,656	1,678	1,845
Labour	Senator Pat Upton	11.3%	1,169	1,309	1,352	1,424	1,454	1,492	1,520	1,780
Progressive Democrats	Cáit Keane	10.9%	1,128	1,159	1,173	1,218	1,267	1,317	1,376	1,542
Fianna Fáil	Sean Ardagh*	10.4%	1,070	1,075	1,268	1,311	1,540	2,082		
Fine Gael	Martin Lynch*	9.5%	981	992	1,014	1,037	1,051	1,081	1,096	1,163
Green	Jim Murphy	6.6%	682	751	761	851	880	904	940	
Fianna Fáil	Michael J. Stokes	5.4%	555	564	641	675	848			
Fianna Fáil	Molly Tighe	5.3%	550	559	615	671				
Independent	Seamus Ashe*	5.1%	532	561	566					
Fianna Fáil	Gerry Mullally	4.5%	470	472						
Workers' Party	Deirdre O'Connell	4.2%	430							
Electorate: 24,148 Valid: 10,333 (42.8%) Spoilt: 85 Quota: 1,723 Turnout: 10,418 (43.1%)
