= 2024 South Dublin County Council election =

Part of the 2024 Irish local elections

- 7 June 2024

All 40 seats on South Dublin County Council 21 seats needed for a majority
	First party	Second party	Third party
Party	Fine Gael	Fianna Fáil	Sinn Féin
Last election	7	8	6
Seats won	9	5	5
Seat change	▲2	▼3	▼1
	Fourth party	Fifth party	Sixth party
Party	People Before Profit	Labour	Social Democrats
Last election	1	2	1
Seats won	4	3	2
Seat change	▲3	▲1	▲1
	Seventh party	Eighth party	Ninth party
Party	Independent Ireland	Irish Freedom	Independent
Last election	N/A	N/A	9
Seats won	1	1	10
Seat change	Steady	Steady	▲1

An election to all 40 seats on South Dublin County Council was held on 7 June 2024 as part of the 2024 Irish local elections. South Dublin is divided into 7 local electoral areas (LEAs) to elect councillors for a five-year term of office on the electoral system of proportional representation by means of the single transferable vote (PR-STV). There was a 41.4% voter turnout.

== Retiring incumbents ==
The following councillors did not seek re-election:

Constituency	Departing Councillor	Party
Clondalkin	Kenny Egan	Fine Gael
Lucan	Ed O'Brien	Fianna Fáil
Palmerstown-Fonthill	Guss O'Connell	Independent
Tallaght Central	Charlie O'Connor	Fianna Fáil

== Results by party ==
Party	Candidates	Seats	±	1st pref	FPv%	±%
Fine Gael	13	9	▲2	14,851	14.10	▼3.39
Fianna Fáil	11	5	▼3	11,468	10.89	▼8.13
Sinn Féin	21	5	▼1	10,892	10.34	▼1.26
People Before Profit	7	4	▲3	4,623	4.39	▲0.59
Labour	5	3	▲1	6,618	6.29	▼2.12
Social Democrats	5	2	▲1	3,587	3.40	▼1.54
Independent Ireland	1	1	New	972	0.92	New
Irish Freedom	1	1	New	964	0.91	New
Green	7	0	▼4	2,955	2.81	▼6.82
National Party	4	0	New	1,387	1.32	New
Aontú	2	0	Steady	1,124	1.06	▲0.22
Solidarity	2	0	▼1	1,066	1.01	▼3.87
The Irish People	3	0	New	1,007	0.96	New
Ireland First	1	0	New	556	0.53	New
Workers' Party	1	0	Steady	364	0.35	▲0.06
Party for Animal Welfare	1	0	New	74	0.07	New
Independent	26	10	▲1	21,963	20.86	▲4.06
Total	111	40	Steady	84,471	100.00	

== Results by LEA ==
*: Outgoing councillor elected in 2019.
†: Outgoing councillor coopted subsequent to the 2019 election.

=== Clondalkin ===
Clondalkin: 7 seats
Party	Candidate	FPv%	Count														
Party	Candidate	FPv%	1	2	3	4	5	6	7	8	9	10	11	12	13	14	15
Independent	Francis Timmons	15.5	1,988														
People Before Profit	Darragh Adelaide	8.9	1,140	1,178	1,180	1,182	1,191	1,209	1,229	1,277	1,293	1,317	1,350	1,409	1,490	1,547	1,718
Fianna Fáil	Trevor Gilligan	7.8	1,003	1,064	1,066	1,066	1,076	1,092	1,093	1,114	1,121	1,131	1,153	1,172	1,185	1,212	1,365
Fine Gael	Shirley O'Hara	7.7	987	1,006	1,007	1,011	1,016	1,029	1,031	1,048	1,049	1,055	1,057	1,063	1,064	1,215	1,483
Independent Ireland	Linda de Courcy	7.6	972	997	998	999	1,000	1,008	1,009	1,019	1,154	1,162	1,353	1,370	1,386	1,423	1,461
Sinn Féin	William Carey	7.5	965	987	988	992	1,000	1,008	1,048	1,060	1,073	1,244	1,269	1,777			
Fianna Fáil	Ciaran Power	7.3	931	949	949	951	956	962	963	973	977	981	988	996	999	1,115	1,133
Social Democrats	Eoin Ó Broin	7.0	901	960	961	962	968	1,014	1,028	1,091	1,103	1,130	1,149	1,183	1,212	1,499	1,594
Fine Gael	Sarah Adedeji	5.5	698	720	720	724	744	770	780	813	813	816	820	832	840	868	
Social Democrats	Lynn Tierney	5.2	664	685	687	696	705	725	727	744	756	765	781	801	826		
Sinn Féin	Joseph Nugent	3.4	431	448	450	451	455	459	543	550	565	756	777				
Sinn Féin	Mark Hampson	3.1	403	411	411	412	412	416	481	484	489						
Independent	Trevor Conlon	2.9	376	402	403	404	408	413	414	416	491	497					
The Irish People	Lauralee Robinson	2.8	362	381	381	382	387	388	390	392							
Sinn Féin	Rosemary Masinga	1.9	249	255	257	257	261	262									
Labour	Josh Ellul	1.8	225	234	234	284	287	308	315								
Green	Laura Donaghy	1.5	197	203	203	206	209										
Independent	Kahir Ullah	1.1	144	151	158	160											
Independent	Viktor Kozyrev	1.1	135	136	136												
Independent	Mahim Rizvi	0.2	30	33													
Electorate: 32,221 Valid: 12,801 Spoilt: 279 Quota: 1,601 Turnout: 13,080 (40.59%)

=== Firhouse–Bohernabreena ===
Firhouse–Bohernabreena: 5 seats
Party	Candidate	FPv%	Count							
Party	Candidate	FPv%	1	2	3	4	5	6	7	8
Independent	Alan Edge	23.4	2,578							
Fine Gael	Brian Lawlor	20.8	2,293							
Fianna Fáil	Emma Murphy	16.9	1,864							
Fine Gael	Sarah Barnes	9.1	1,000	1,186	1,509	1,523	1,531	1,541	1,589	1,870
Sinn Féin	Róisín Mannion	5.4	590	649	669	694	744	1,239	1,310	1,391
Social Democrats	Helen Meaney	5.3	583	701	730	750	911	935	997	1,314
Green	Lyn Hagin Meade	5.3	578	703	758	765	812	829	843	
National Party	Yan Mac Oireachtaigh	4.6	507	554	560	640	667	687		
Sinn Féin	Sarah Holland	4.3	477	526	535	551	631			
People Before Profit	Philomena Foster	3.2	353	423	432	452				
Independent	Nicholas Reddin	1.6	180	270	278					
Electorate: 27,225 Valid: 11,003 Spoilt: 111 Quota: 1,834 Turnout: 11,114 (40.82%)

=== Lucan ===
Lucan: 5 seats
Party	Candidate	FPv%	Count											
Party	Candidate	FPv%	1	2	3	4	5	6	7	8	9	10	11	12
Independent	Paul Gogarty	23.1	2,671											
Fine Gael	Vicki Casserly	13.6	1,574	1,708	1,721	1,736	1,758	1,884	1,892	1,958				
Independent	Liona O'Toole	10.7	1,231	1,457	1,463	1,473	1,494	1,540	1,672	1,749	1,755	1,781	1,879	2,017
Fine Gael	Caroline Brady	10.4	1,199	1,266	1,279	1,280	1,304	1,378	1,385	1,423	1,436	1,469	1,491	1,698
Labour	Joanna Tuffy	7.7	890	990	996	1,008	1,016	1,067	1,077	1,174	1,182	1,205	1,281	1,445
Sinn Féin	Derren Ó Brádaigh	5.7	659	698	702	936	944	960	988	1,036	1,038	1,061	1,279	1,344
Green	Jithin Ram	5.1	592	618	626	630	764	774	775	803	804	856	911	
Independent	Kamal Shah	4.5	521	524	527	530	542	550	552	554	554			
Social Democrats	Stephen Nolan	3.3	383	422	424	434	442	457	469					
People Before Profit	Mark Kerins	3.3	378	410	416	439	441	446	492	563	565	584		
The Irish People	Robert Coyle	3.2	368	388	390	397	400	410						
Fianna Fáil	Frank Conway	3.1	360	385	388	393	395							
Independent	Joseph Roy Kunchalakatt	2.8	323	336	343	346								
Sinn Féin	Lorraine Dwyer	2.7	312	330	333									
Independent	Eben Agbana	0.8	92	95										
Electorate: 25,638 Valid: 11,553 Spoilt: 120 Quota: 1,926 Turnout: 11,673 (45.53%)

=== Palmerstown–Fonthill ===
Palmerstown–Fonthill: 5 seats
Party	Candidate	FPv%	Count														
Party	Candidate	FPv%	1	2	3	4	5	6	7	8	9	10	11	12	13	14	15
Fianna Fáil	Shane Moynihan	13.9	1,348	1,361	1,382	1,390	1,418	1,470	1,477	1,494	1,510	1,785					
Independent	Alan Hayes	13.8	1,335	1,339	1,363	1,408	1,425	1,442	1,447	1,552	1,558	1,594	1,615	1,707			
Irish Freedom	Glen Moore	9.9	964	967	975	989	992	993	997	1,016	1,024	1,028	1,028	1,244	1,264	1,355	1,464
Sinn Féin	Niamh Fennell	8.7	848	853	861	872	898	911	965	1,001	1,151	1,173	1,184	1,245	1,247	1,995	
People Before Profit	Madeleine Johansson	7.9	762	784	800	807	849	864	881	957	985	1,023	1,038	1,114	1,125	1,222	1,351
Independent	Paul Gogarty	7.2	700	707	749	825	859	873	879	931	943	992	1,040	1,139	1,164	1,189	1,299
Sinn Féin	Daniel Loftus	7.1	684	691	696	698	705	711	780	811	1,014	1,029	1,032	1,095	1,097		
Aontú	Colm Quinn	6.9	669	671	677	687	692	697	702	726	747	763	793				
Fine Gael	Emma Griffin	4.0	387	398	404	413	438	534	535	554	557						
Workers' Party	David Gardiner	3.8	364	372	387	399	421	429	432								
Sinn Féin	Ruth Nolan	3.2	314	320	321	322	326	331	472	479							
Sinn Féin	Cathal Ó Murchú	3.2	306	308	309	310	312	313									
Fine Gael	Sikandar Jahanzab	2.6	248	265	270	273	294										
Green	Karla Doran	2.3	219	231	235	249											
Independent	Gavin Callaghan	2.1	205	205	235												
Independent	Shane Fitzgerald	2.1	201	204													
Labour	Funmi Soyemi Olatunji	1.4	139														
Electorate: 26,182 Valid: 9,693 Spoilt: 213 Quota: 1,616 Turnout: 9,906 (37.84%)

=== Rathfarnham–Templeogue ===
Rathfarnham–Templeogue: 7 seats
Party	Candidate	FPv%	Count										
Party	Candidate	FPv%	1	2	3	4	5	6	7	8	9	10	11
Labour	Pamela Kearns	17.4	3,341										
Independent	Ronan McMahon	14.9	2,873										
Labour	Ciarán Ahern	10.5	2,023	2,245	2,282	2,292	2,296	2,306	2,318	2,373	2,437		
Fianna Fáil	Yvonne Collins	8.8	1,691	1,773	1,816	1,817	1,820	1,824	1,841	1,847	1,917	2,068	2,146
Fine Gael	Lynn McCrave	8.4	1,620	1,702	1,745	1,748	1,749	1,752	1,761	1,773	2,162	2,350	2,394
Fine Gael	David McManus	6.7	1,292	1,341	1,390	1,395	1,397	1,399	1,419	1,427	1,720	1,858	1,882
Fianna Fáil	Lilian Guéret	5.6	1,073	1,215	1,281	1,290	1,293	1,300	1,308	1,327	1,402	1,517	1,597
Social Democrats	Justin Sinnott	5.5	1,056	1,132	1,155	1,172	1,188	1,202	1,234	1,490	1,515	1,932	2,426
Green	Mark Lynch	5.4	1,036	1,097	1,123	1,125	1,127	1,131	1,137	1,198	1,235		
Fine Gael	Conor McMahon	4.4	839	945	1,018	1,027	1,031	1,033	1,050	1,052			
Sinn Féin	Anne Dillon	4.1	780	817	826	828	837	1,124	1,166	1,315	1,326	1,395	
People Before Profit	Conor Kelly	3.0	572	600	610	625	643	654	689				
National Party	Yan Mac Oireachtaigh	1.9	358	365	381	389	585	586					
Sinn Féin	Enda Fanning	1.8	337	350	356	356	362						
The Irish People	Conor Rafferty	1.4	277	285	305	330							
Independent	Colm O'Keeffe	0.4	73	95	141								
Electorate: 41,440 Valid: 19,241 Spoilt: 197 Quota: 2,406 Turnout: 19,438 (46.91%)

=== Tallaght Central ===
Tallaght Central: 6 seats
Party	Candidate	FPv%	Count															
Party	Candidate	FPv%	1	2	3	4	5	6	7	8	9	10	11	12	13	14	15	16
Independent	Mick Duff	15.3	1,938															
Fianna Fáil	Teresa Costello	15.2	1,926															
Fine Gael	Britto Pereppadan	12.2	1,542	1,561	1,561	1,589	1,661	1,674	1,711	1,730	1,903							
Independent	Paddy Holohan	7.7	967	981	1,007	1,017	1,022	1,040	1,076	1,134	1,154	1,159	1,308	1,439	1,488	1,933		
People Before Profit	Jess Spear	6.8	859	868	870	873	911	923	937	939	955	968	1,008	1,077	1,127	1,150	1,164	1,229
Solidarity	Kieran Mahon	5.3	669	679	682	686	707	716	732	749	777	791	840	878	918	957	998	1,091
Sinn Féin	Shane Duggan	4.8	601	611	612	617	626	663	673	696	712	715	732	747	934	956	973	
Sinn Féin	Niamh Whelan	4.5	567	571	574	580	586	707	725	729	739	746	755	784	1,112	1,130	1,150	1,804
Sinn Féin	Cora McCann	4.4	559	566	567	570	583	627	638	644	658	660	698	732				
Ireland First	Philip Dwyer	4.4	556	562	605	607	609	610	621	712	727	733	778	878	886			
Aontú	Saoirse Ní Chónaráin	3.6	455	460	473	476	497	501	522	543	580	598	634					
Independent	Ken Harrington	3.4	434	440	442	446	458	464	485	549	570	583						
Fianna Fáil	Thyes Kavanagh	3.0	375	389	390	429	440	441	448	453								
Independent	Dave Daly	2.3	297	308	321	326	329	331	361									
Sinn Féin	Robert Russell	2.1	265	266	267	269	278											
Independent	Jimmy Owens	2.0	259	267	272	274	283	285										
Green	Vanessa Mulhall	2.0	250	257	258	262												
National Party	Yan Mac Oireachtaigh	1.0	121	122														
Electorate: 30,256 Valid: 12,640 Spoilt: 246 Quota: 1,806 Turnout: 12,886 (42.59%)

=== Tallaght South ===
Tallaght South: 5 seats
Party	Candidate	FPv%	Count								
Party	Candidate	FPv%	1	2	3	4	5	6	7	8	9
Independent	Paddy Holohan	21.8	1,643								
Fine Gael	Baby Pereppaddan	15.5	1,172	1,180	1,189	1,213	1,269				
Fianna Fáil	Lynda Prendergast	9.2	690	699	702	718	791	795	814	825	
Independent	Dermot Richardson	8.9	674	783	797	800	853	869	929	1,116	1,243
Sinn Féin	Cathal King	8.7	657	700	701	702	713	778	817	848	903
People Before Profit	Kay Keane	7.4	559	592	598	610	639	659	876	908	1,010
Sinn Féin	Louise Dunne	7.3	550	578	583	588	615	855	907	934	1,049
National Party	Yan Mac Oireachtaigh	5.3	401	462	472	472	497	503	527		
Solidarity	Leah Whelan	5.3	397	427	431	440	470	477			
Sinn Féin	Anthony Clinton	4.5	338	357	361	362	373				
Fianna Fáil	Adam Smyth	2.7	207	213	216	218					
Independent	Geraldine Conlon	1.3	95	126	135	138					
Green	Suzanne McEneaney	1.1	83	83	88						
Party for Animal Welfare	Patrice Nugent	1.0	74	83							
Electorate: 24,505 Valid: 7,540 Spoilt: 184 Quota: 1,257 Turnout: 7,724 (31.52%)

== Changes ==
=== Co-options ===
Party	Outgoing	LEA	Reason	Date	Co-optee
Independent	Paddy Holohan	Tallaght Central	Elected for two areas; Tallaght Central and Tallaght South, resigned from Tallaght Central.	September 2024	Dean Donnelly
Fianna Fáil	Shane Moynihan	Palmerstown–Fonthill	Elected to 34th Dáil at the 2024 general election	19 December 2024	Jacqueline Sheehy
Labour	Ciarán Ahern	Rathfarnham–Templeogue	Elected to 34th Dáil at the 2024 general election	19 December 2024	Paddy Cosgrave
Independent	Paul Gogarty	Lucan	Elected to 34th Dáil at the 2024 general election	19 December 2024	Helen Farrell
Fianna Fáil	Teresa Costello	Tallaght Central	Elected to 27th Seanad at the 2025 Seanad election	31 January 2025	Adam Smyth
PBP–Solidarity	Darragh Adelaide	Clondalkin	Resignation	25 February 2026	Gino Kenny
Sinn Féin	Niamh Fennell	Palmerstown–Fonthill	Emigrated to Australia	28 May 2026	Daniel Loftus

=== Changes in affiliation ===
Name	LEA	Elected as	New affiliation	Date
Francis Timmons	Clondalkin	Independent	Labour	25 October 2024
Francis Timmons	Clondalkin	Labour	Independent	13 December 2024
Glen Moore	Palmerstown–Fonthill	Irish Freedom	Independent	28 February 2025
Madeleine Johansson	Palmerstown–Fonthill	PBP–Solidarity	Independent	9 June 2025
