= 1991 Dublin County Council election in Fingal =

Part of the 1991 Irish local elections

1991 Fingal County Council election
- 27 June 1991

24 seats to the council of the electoral county of Fingal within Dublin County Council
	First party	Second party	Third party
Party	Fianna Fáil	Fine Gael	Labour
Seats won	8	6	5
Seat change	-5	-1	+2
	Fourth party	Fifth party	Sixth party
Party	Green	Progressive Democrats	Independent
Seats won	2	1	2
Seat change	+2	+1	+1
- Map showing the area of Fingal County Council
Council control after election
TBD

An election to the electoral county of Fingal within Dublin County to Dublin County Council took place on 27 June 1991 as part of that year's Irish local elections. 24 councillors were elected for a five-year term of office from six local electoral areas (LEAs) on the system of proportional representation by means of the single transferable vote (PR-STV). It was one of three electoral counties within Dublin County at this election, the others being Dún Laoghaire–Rathdown and South Dublin. The term was extended twice, first to 1998, then to 1999.

The electoral county had been established in 1985 as Dublin–Fingal and was renamed Fingal for these local elections.

From 1 January 1994, on the coming into effect of the Local Government (Dublin) Act 1993, County Dublin was disestablished as an administrative county, and in its place the electoral counties became three new counties. The councillors listed below became the councillors for Fingal County Council from that date.

== Results by party ==
Party	Seats	±	First Pref. votes	FPv%	±%
Fianna Fáil	8	-5	15,264	31.7	
Fine Gael	6	-1	9,753	20.2	
Labour	5	+2	8,435	17.5	
Green	2	+2	4,080	8.5	
Progressive Democrats	1	+1	3,430	7.1	
Independent	2	+1	5,012	10.4	
Totals	24	0	48,230	100.0	—

== Results by local electoral area ==
=== Balbriggan ===
Balbriggan - 5 seats
Party	Candidate	FPv%	Count										
Party	Candidate	FPv%	1	2	3	4	5	6	7	8	9	10	11
Labour	Ken Farrell*	17.5%	1,865										
Green	Trevor Sargent	13.2%	1,405	1,413	1,464	1,507	1,532	1,730	1,957				
Fianna Fáil	Sean Gilbride*	10.4%	1,104	1,107	1,114	1,126	1,204	1,267	1,306	1,318	1,463	1,554	1,671
Fianna Fáil	Jim Geraghty*	8.6%	916	922	923	925	1,017	1,072	1,100	1,103	1,190	1,222	1,260
Fine Gael	Cathal Boland*	8.2%	871	878	882	1,015	1,037	1,137	1,168	1,191	1,266	1,457	1,679
Fianna Fáil	Jack Larkin*	6.7%	711	712	727	744	789	796	862	880	1,167	1,309	1,489
Fianna Fáil	John Maxwell	6.2%	665	666	668	674	731	732	747	752			
Labour	Joe Davis	5.7%	608	653	695	722	738	754	855	897	924	1,108	
Progressive Democrats	David Murray	5.5%	585	587	595	638	648	681	766	830	879		
Independent	Liam Dineen	5%	532	535	553	557	563						
Independent	Gertie Sheilds	4.7%	503	506	534	565	572	634					
Fianna Fáil	Wilbur McKittrick	3.5%	374	381	386	387							
Fine Gael	Patricia Gallen	2.9%	313	314	324								
Workers' Party	Anne McCarthy	1.2%	123	125									
Independent	Sean Brady	0.7%	78	78									
Electorate: 19,705 Valid: 10,653 (54.1%) Spoilt: 100 Quota: 1,776 Turnout: 10,753 (54.6%)

=== Castleknock ===
Castleknock - 4 seats
Party	Candidate	FPv%	Count										
Party	Candidate	FPv%	1	2	3	4	5	6	7	8	9	10	11
Independent	Seán Lyons*	18.5%	1,378	1,396	1,412	1,446	1,523						
Fine Gael	Tom Morrissey	15.8%	1,172	1,213	1,217	1,228	1,249	1,259	1,333	1,338	1,814		
Progressive Democrats	Sheila Terry	14.7%	1,093	1,099	1,106	1,121	1,172	1,214	1,401	1,417	1,683		
Fianna Fáil	Ned Ryan*	10.9%	807	812	815	818	823	942	978	981	1,049	1,124	1,181
Fine Gael	Eithne Loftus	10.5%	780	825	829	833	853	878	950	958			
Fianna Fáil	Tom Boland*	10.1%	752	753	761	768	770	954	989	993	1,037	1,112	1,164
Fianna Fáil	Miley Caldwell	5.9%	439	442	446	450	455						
Green	Paul Gogarty	5.3%	391	391	394	448	549	576					
Workers' Party	Patricia Condron	2.6%	196	197	213								
Labour	Joanna Tuffy	2.2%	167	169	239	316							
Labour	Willie Byrne	1.8%	136	137									
Fine Gael	Patrick Malone	1.7%	123										
Electorate: 15,777 Valid: 7,434 (47.1%) Spoilt: 29 Quota: 1,487 Turnout: 7,463 (47.3%)

=== Howth ===
Howth - 4 seats
Party	Candidate	FPv%	Count								
Party	Candidate	FPv%	1	2	3	4	5	6	7	8	9
Fine Gael	Michael Joe Cosgrave*	17.7%	1,342	1,401	1,457	1,502	1,545				
Fine Gael	Joan Maher*	15%	1,141	1,155	1,204	1,255	1,300	1,301	1,541		
Green	David Healy	10.4%	789	797	869	914	938	943	1,155	1,275	1,454
Fianna Fáil	Liam Creaven*	9.3%	704	822	841	877	1,053	1,060	1,166	1,784	
Workers' Party	Niall Behan	9.2%	695	711	908	923	953	955	1,091	1,131	1,190
Fianna Fáil	Dympna Clune	7.2%	550	589	597	625	893	901	964		
Fianna Fáil	Tom Beary	6.8%	519	569	611	617					
Progressive Democrats	Noel Peers	6.7%	511	540	570	864	885	888			
Progressive Democrats	Michael Kenny	6.6%	500	503	522						
Labour	Frank Barry	6.5%	497	502							
Fianna Fáil	Eugene Rudden	4.5%	345								
Electorate: 16,807 Valid: 7,593 (45.2%) Spoilt: 56 Quota: 1,519 Turnout: 7,649 (45.5%)

=== Malahide ===
Malahide - 4 seats
Party	Candidate	FPv%	Count							
Party	Candidate	FPv%	1	2	3	4	5	6	7	8
Fianna Fáil	G.V. Wright*	23.1%	1,929							
Labour	Bernie Malone*	14.4%	1,198	1,217	1,268	1,298	1,363	1,475	1,527	1,702
Fine Gael	Nora Owen*	13.8%	1,148	1,185	1,225	1,243	1,279	1,469	1,533	1,830
Fianna Fáil	Michael Kennedy	11.1%	923	986	1,005	1,049	1,094	1,106	1,525	1,723
Green	Alan Nagle	9.7%	813	827	856	915	957	1,047	1,082	1,222
Fine Gael	Terri Jones	8%	670	672	705	732	826	848	870	
Fianna Fáil	Pat Dunne*	5.7%	472	581	603	622	629	650		
Progressive Democrats	Bill O'Brien	4.7%	394	401	405	415	493			
Progressive Democrats	Mary Webberley	4.2%	347	350	353	374				
Independent	Angela Keaveney	2.9%	241	244	252					
Fine Gael	John Hancox	2.5%	211	213						
Electorate: 16,431 Valid: 8,346 (50.8%) Spoilt: 37 Quota: 1,670 Turnout: 8,385 (51%)

=== Mulhuddart ===
Mulhuddart - 3 seats
Party	Candidate	FPv%	Count							
Party	Candidate	FPv%	1	2	3	4	5	6	7	8
Independent	Joe Higgins	19.6%	1,281	1,294	1,316	1,347	1,464	1,581	1,652	
Fine Gael	Marian Sheehan*	29.2%	906	920	933	1,020	1,025	1,151	1,200	1,289
Fianna Fáil	Marian McGennis*	13.8%	903	955	969	1,031	1,054	1,099	1,536	1,642
Labour	Joan Burton	12.9%	844	856	887	916	934	1,018	1,074	1,499
Workers' Party	Ollie Lunney	10.3%	672	682	706	718	771	837	868	
Fianna Fáil	Jim Fahey*	9.5%	620	651	662	670	685	730		
Independent	Tom Reynolds	6.9%	450	459	491	507	527			
Sinn Féin	Jim Heffernan	4%	264	267	275	282				
Fine Gael	Jim Fleming	3.9%	254	255	268					
Green	Anthony McGuinness	2.6%	168	177						
Fianna Fáil	P.J. Leahy	1.9%	123							
Independent	Frank Clarke	0.54%	35							
Electorate: 13,768 Valid: 6,520 (47.4%) Spoilt: 72 Quota: 1,631 Turnout: 6,592 (47.9%)

=== Swords ===
Swords - 4 seats
Party	Candidate	FPv%	Count								
Party	Candidate	FPv%	1	2	3	4	5	6	7	8	9
Labour	Seán Ryan*	34.7%	2,667								
Fianna Fáil	Cyril Gallagher*	11.3%	872	963	998	1,003	1,046	1,496	1,562		
Fianna Fáil	Margaret O'Connor	10.5%	809	846	854	917	963	1,177	1,285	1,299	1,316
Fianna Fáil	Larry Mulvihil	9.5%	727	821	840	857	887				
Fine Gael	Anne Devitt*	9%	689	783	875	893	988	1,065	1,268	1,316	1,324
Green	Tommy Nolan	6.7%	514	608	640	718	893	937			
Labour	Tom Kelleher*	5.9%	453	1,006	1,034	1,154	1,251	1,287	1,599		
Independent	Elaine Hobson	5.3%	406	466	507	562					
Workers' Party	Tim O'Brien	4%	306	366	380						
Fine Gael	Tom McCormack	1.7%	133	162							
Independent	Noel Crosbie	1.4%	108	126							
Electorate: 17,053 Valid: 7,684 (45%) Spoilt: 54 Quota: 1,537 Turnout: 7,738 (45.4%)
