= County Hall, Tallaght =

Municipal building in South Dublin, Ireland

- Halla an Chontae, Tamhlacht
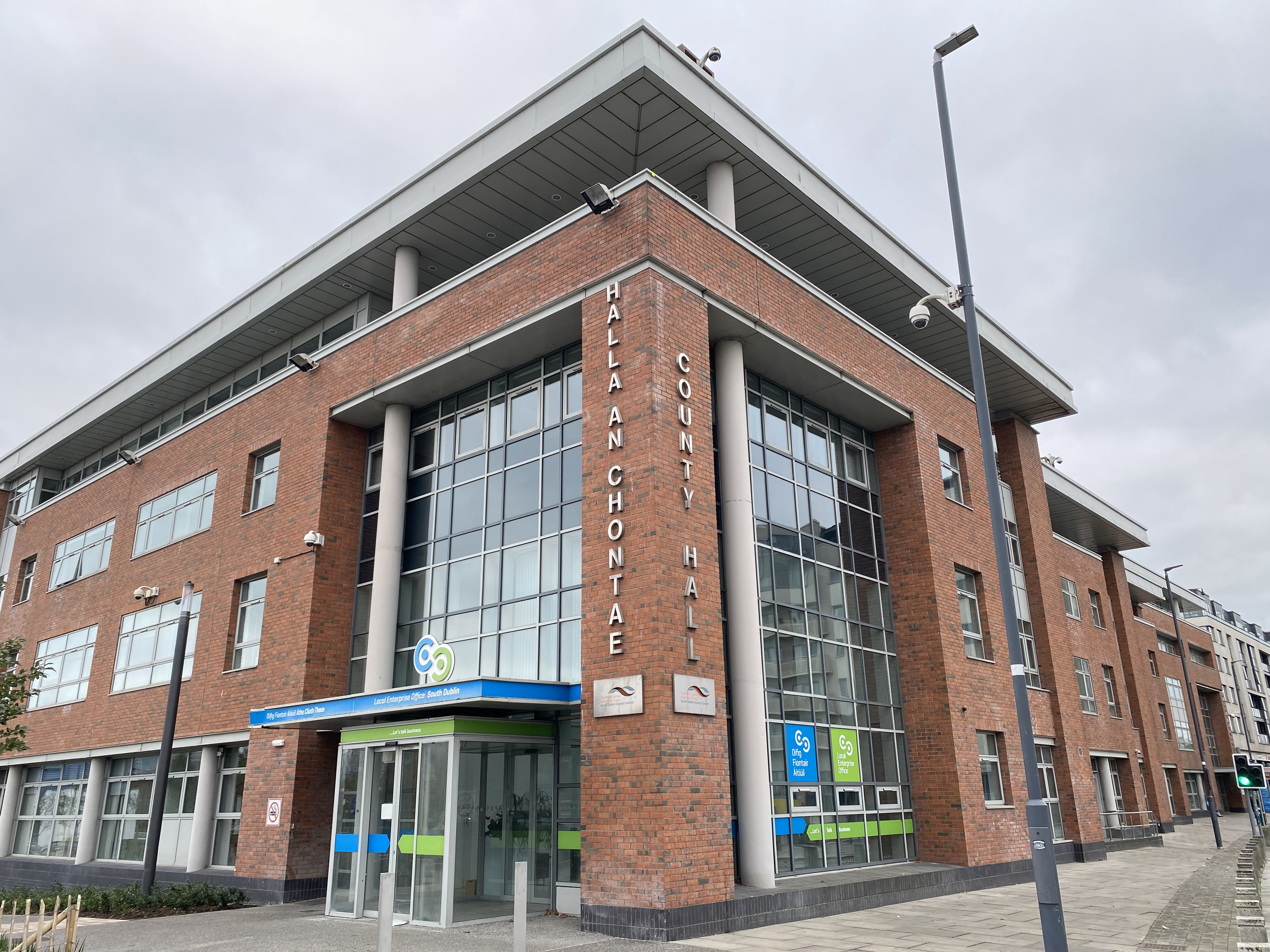
- County Hall

- Location within Ireland

General information
- Location: Tallaght, South Dublin, Ireland
- Coordinates: 53.2889°N 6.3733°W
- Completed: 1994

Design and construction
- Architect: Gilroy McMahon

County Hall (Irish: Halla an Chontae, Tamhlacht) is a municipal building in Tallaght in the county of South Dublin, Ireland.

== History ==
Following the implementation of the Local Government (Dublin) Act 1993, which created South Dublin County Council, the county council initially met in the Regional Technical College, Tallaght. The new building, which was designed by Gilroy McMahon, was purpose-built for the county council and completed in 1994.
