= 1991 Dublin County Council election in Dún Laoghaire–Rathdown =

Part of the 1991 Irish local elections

1991 Dublin County Council election (Dún Laoghaire–Rathdown)
- 27 June 1991

28 seats on the council of the electoral county of Dún Laoghaire–Rathdown within Dublin County Council
	First party	Second party	Third party
Party	Fianna Fáil	Fine Gael	Labour
Seats won	8	7	5
Seat change	−5	−4	+2
	Fourth party	Fifth party	Sixth party
Party	Green	Workers' Party	Progressive Democrats
Seats won	3	3	2
Seat change	+3	+2	+2
- Map showing the area of Dún Laoghaire–Rathdown
Council control after election
TBD

An election to Dublin County Council in the electoral county of Dún Laoghaire–Rathdown within Dublin County took place on 27 June 1991 as part of that year's Irish local elections. 28 councillors were elected from 7 local electoral areas on the system of proportional representation by means of the single transferable vote for a five-year term of office. It was one of three electoral counties within Dublin County at this election, the others being Fingal and South Dublin.

The councillors elected for the electoral areas of Ballybrack, Blackrock and Dún Laoghaire also served as the members of the Corporation of Dún Laoghaire, the council of the Borough of Dún Laoghaire.

From 1 January 1994, on the coming into effect of the Local Government (Dublin) Act 1993, County Dublin was disestablished as an administrative county, and in its place the electoral counties became three new counties. The Borough of Dún Laoghaire was also disestablished as of that date. The councillors listed below became the councillors for Dún Laoghaire–Rathdown County Council from that date.

The term of office was extended twice, first to 1998, then to 1999.

== Results by party ==
Party	Seats	±	First Pref. votes	FPv%	±%
Fianna Fáil	8	−5	17,833	30.3	
Fine Gael	7	−4	14,007	23.8	
Labour	5	+2	7,437	12.6	
Green	3	+3	6,737	11.5	
Workers' Party	3	+2	6,390	10.9	
Progressive Democrats	2	+2	4,823	8.2	
Totals	28	0	58,862	100.0	—

== Results by local electoral area ==
=== Ballybrack ===
Ballybrack: 5 seats
Party	Candidate	FPv%	Count									
Party	Candidate	FPv%	1	2	3	4	5	6	7	8	9	10
Workers' Party	Eamon Gilmore TD*	21.15%	2,104									
Progressive Democrats	Larry Lohan	10.4%	1,035	1,050	1,065	1,096	1,140	1,173	1,240	1,298	1,428	1,531
Labour	Frank Smyth	10.7%	1,063	1,068	1,106	1,148	1,197	1,395	1,428	1,464	1,531	1,613
Fine Gael	Donal Marren*	9.8%	972	999	1,020	1,053	1,076	1,118	1,376	1,422	1,931	
Fianna Fáil	Senator Richard Conroy*	7.9%	784	796	865	1,056	1,077	1,097	1,119	1,600	1,670	
Fine Gael	Colm Brophy	6.9%	684	698	711	721	740	762	926	947		
Green	Maggie Blake	6.4%	640	656	674	693	1,003	1,169	1,226	1,290	1,390	1,477
Fine Gael	Barbara Culleton*	5.8%	579	589	597	613	635	647				
Fianna Fáil	Noirin Butler	5.4%	534	540	611	717	738	756	776			
Green	Vincent Treanor	5%	500	516	530	551						
Fianna Fáil	Owen Hammond*	4.3%	428	444	526							
Fianna Fáil	Noel Long	3.64%	362	379								
Workers' Party	Sylvie Batt	3.35%	333	556	568	587	609					
Electorate: 24,024 Valid: 9,959 (41.5%) Spoilt: 81 Quota: 1,659 Turnout: 10,040 (41.8%)

=== Blackrock ===
Blackrock: 4 seats
Party	Candidate	FPv%	Count								
Party	Candidate	FPv%	1	2	3	4	5	6	7	8	9
Labour	Niamh Bhreathnach	16.1%	1,303	1,317	1,354	1,390	1,538	1,939			
Fianna Fáil	Paddy Madigan*	13.4%	1,089	1,101	1,139	1,336	1,393	1,496	1,524	1,580	1,605
Fine Gael	John H. Dockrell*	10.3%	839	846	869	888	1,024	1,065	1,098	1,789	
Workers' Party	Marian White	10.3%	833	850	884	909	941				
Fine Gael	Aine Elliot*	9.8%	798	806	835	849	969	1,052	1,096		
Fianna Fáil	Anne Brady*	9.7%	784	791	827	1,132	1,187	1,221	1,246	1,370	1,399
Progressive Democrats	Evelynne Davis	8.6%	697	708	736	761					
Fianna Fáil	Michael Cotter	7.9%	641	647	661						
Green	Betty Reeves	6.1%	492	711	786	808	982	1,191	1,370	1,514	1,627
Independent	Marie Walker	4%	324	327							
Green	Michael Dunphy	3.8%	309								
Electorate: 19,450 Valid: 8,109 (41.7%) Spoilt: 51 Quota: 1,623 Turnout: 8,160 (42%)

=== Clonskeagh ===
Clonskeagh: 3 seats
Party	Candidate	FPv%	Count				
Party	Candidate	FPv%	1	2	3	4	5
Fine Gael	Tom Hand*	24.5%	1,443	1,482			
Fianna Fáil	Seamus Brock*	16.2%	956	970	979	1,058	1,580
Green	Richard Greene	14.9%	876	939	1,045	1,405	1,517
Fine Gael	Nuala Fennell TD	13.7%	809	823	937	1,094	1,163
Fianna Fáil	Tim Gilbert	11.8%	694	701	721	755	
Labour	Peter Nolan	9.3%	547	675	705		
Independent	Maurice Dockrell	4.9%	288	298			
Workers' Party	Chris Woods	4.8%	280				
Electorate: 14,294 Valid: 5,893 (41.2%) Spoilt: 42 Quota: 1,474 Turnout: 5,935 (41.5%)

=== Dundrum ===
Dundrum: 4 seats
Party	Candidate	FPv%	Count					
Party	Candidate	FPv%	1	2	3	4	5	6
Fianna Fáil	Tom Kitt TD*	27.9%	2,203					
Fianna Fáil	Tony Fox*	16.1%	1,273	1,537	1,571	1,916		
Fine Gael	Mary Elliott*	15.6%	1,231	1,306	1,340	1,399	1,818	
Labour	Frank Buckley*	13.4%	1,055	1,100	1,371	1,402	1,488	1,543
Green	Jim Ryan	9.7%	768	806	910	969	1,029	1,108
Fine Gael	Austin Corcoran	6.7%	528	561	579	600		
Workers' Party	Pat Brady	5.9%	464	475				
Fianna Fáil	Siobhan Lawlor	4.7%	367	526	534			
Electorate: 17,467 Valid: 7,889 (45.2%) Spoilt: 55 Quota: 1,578 Turnout: 7,944 (45.5%)

=== Dún Laoghaire ===
Dún Laoghaire: 5 seats
Party	Candidate	FPv%	Count								
Party	Candidate	FPv%	1	2	3	4	5	6	7	8	9
Fine Gael	Senator Liam T. Cosgrave*	15.5%	1,759	1,859	1,887	1,903					
Fianna Fáil	Betty Coffey*	13.6%	1,547	1,550	1,568	1,762	1,819	1,958			
Progressive Democrats	Senator Helen Keogh	11.9%	1,346	1,380	1,420	1,431	1,580	1,599	1,602	1,690	1,847
Workers' Party	Colm Breathnach	10.8%	1,227	1,232	1,244	1,253	1,271	1,495	1,512	1,576	1,669
Labour	Jane Dillon-Byrne*	10.1%	1,149	1,170	1,210	1,224	1,302	1,361	1,372	1,453	1,595
Fianna Fáil	Bill Harvey*	7.6%	861	861	870	976	1,019	1,070	1,097	1,120	
Green	Vincent MacDowell	6.2%	700	708	791	801	856	922	926	1,440	1,566
Sinn Féin	Kevin Fitzpatrick	6.1%	688	695	700	712	716				
Green	Jane Sexton	5.4%	611	637	690	703	778	838	841		
Fine Gael	Brendan Henderson*	4.2%	474	637	690	703	778	838	841		
Fianna Fáil	Labhras O Murchú	3.4%	384	385	393						
Independent	Thomas O'Rafferty	2.8%	320	330							
Fine Gael	Donna Pierce	2.4%	275								
Independent	Jim Merriman	0.13	15	395							
Electorate: 27,220 Valid: 11,356 (41.7%) Spoilt: 118 Quota: 1,893 Turnout: 11,474 (42.2%)

=== Glencullen ===
Glencullen: 3 seats
Party	Candidate	FPv%	Count							
Party	Candidate	FPv%	1	2	3	4	5	6	7	8
Fine Gael	Seán Barrett TD	16.8%	1,272	1,295	1,602	1,718	1,987			
Fianna Fáil	Larry Butler	16.4%	1,239	1,379	1,437	1,477	1,600	1,626	2,415	
Workers' Party	Denis O'Callaghan	15.2%	1,149	1,159	1,174	1,389	1,442	1,459	1,560	1,622
Fianna Fáil	Jimmy Murphy*	14.5%	1,094	1,160	1,178	1,194	1,237	1,244		
Green	Alastair McKinstry	10.7%	809	818	853	1,004	1,216	1,263	1,412	1,594
Progressive Democrats	Sean O Siocháin	8.3%	630	633	688	752				
Labour	Deirdre Cox	7.8%	588	591	615					
Fine Gael	Sam Carroll*	6.7%	509	521						
Fianna Fáil	John Brennan	3.5%	267							
Electorate: 18,775 Valid: 7,557 (40.3%) Spoilt: 44 Quota: 1,890 Turnout: 7,601 (40.5%)

=== Stillorgan ===
Stillorgan: 4 seats
Party	Candidate	FPv%	Count							
Party	Candidate	FPv%	1	2	3	4	5	6	7	8
Labour	Eithne Fitzgerald*	22.2%	1,800							
Fine Gael	Olivia Mitchell*	17.1%	1,387	1,441	1,773					
Green	Larry Gordon	12.7%	1,032	1,093	1,117	1,154	1,181	1,289	1,781	
Fianna Fáil	Paddy Hickey*	11.6%	940	951	961	967	1,130	1,164	1,280	1,363
Fianna Fáil	Senator Don Lydon*	11.4%	924	934	958	965	1,170	1,204	1,399	1,475
Progressive Democrats	Anna Murphy	7.2%	582	596	622	671	709	1,134		
Progressive Democrats	Victor Boyhan	6.6%	533	545	574	622	646			
Fianna Fáil	Carmel Ryan	5.7%	462	470	473	477				
Fine Gael	Eugene Cranley	5.5%	448	456						
Electorate: 19,000 Valid: 8,108 (42.7%) Spoilt: 44 Quota: 1,622 Turnout: 8,152 (42.9%)
