= 2004 South Dublin County Council election =

Part of the 2004 Irish local elections

- 11 June 2004

All 26 seats on South Dublin County Council
	First party	Second party	Third party
Party	Labour	Fianna Fáil	Sinn Féin
Seats won	7	6	3
Seat change	-	-2	+1
	Fourth party	Fifth party	Sixth party
Party	Fine Gael	Green	Progressive Democrats
Seats won	3	2	2
Seat change	-	+1	-
	Seventh party	Eighth party
Party	Socialist Party	Independent
Seats won	1	2
Seat change	+1	-1
- Map showing the area of South Dublin County Council
Council control after election
TBD

An election to South Dublin County Council took place on 11 June 2004 as part of that year's Irish local elections. 26 councillors were elected from five local electoral areas using the Single transferable vote system for a five-year term of office.

== Results by party ==
Party	Seats	±	First Pref. votes	FPv%	±%
Labour	7	-	16,826	18.94	
Fianna Fáil	6	-2	22,825	25.70	
Sinn Féin	3	+1	12,235	13.78	
Fine Gael	3	-	10,857	12.22	
Green	2	+1	7,033	7.92	
Progressive Democrats	2	-	6,689	7.53	
Socialist Party	1	+1	2,505	2.82	
Independent	2	-1	8,804	9.91	
Totals	26	-	88,818	100.00	—

== Results by local electoral area ==
=== Clondalkin ===
Clondalkin - 5 seats
Party	Candidate	FPv%	Count								
Party	Candidate	FPv%	1	2	3	4	5	6	7	8	9
Sinn Féin	Shane O'Connor	17.07	2,421								
Labour	Robert Dowds*	14.06	1,994	2,007	2,013	2,053	2,375				
Fine Gael	Therese Ridge*	12.08	1,714	1,723	1,729	1,771	1,847	1,936	2,051	2,247	2,503
Progressive Democrats	Colm Tyndall*	11.47	1,627	1,636	1,640	1,768	1,791	1,912	2,099	2,285	2,627
Socialist Workers	Gino Kenny	7.36	1,044	1,068	1,083	1,092	1,164	1,183	1,203	1,336	1,451
Fianna Fáil	Trevor Gilligan	6.47	918	927	930	988	1,038	1,214	1,574	1,716	1,875
Green	Dorothy Corrigan	6.35	900	912	920	930	975	1,008	1,059		
Independent	Colm McGrath*	6.07	861	905	911	947	968	1,013	1,103	1,238	
Labour	Marie Grogan	4.84	686	691	696	700					
Fianna Fáil	Sheila O'Brien*	4.77	677	680	681	783	801	969			
Fianna Fáil	Neil O'Neill	4.21	597	604	606	728	741				
Fianna Fáil	Ray Verso	4.18	593	593	594						
Independent	Noel Kelly	1.06	151								
Electorate: 30,462 Valid: 14,183 (46.56%) Spoilt: 344 Quota: 2,364 Turnout: 14,527 (47.69%)

=== Lucan ===
Lucan - 4 seats
Party	Candidate	FPv%	Count							
Party	Candidate	FPv%	1	2	3	4	5	6	7	8
Independent	Derek Keating*	21.75	3,680							
Green	Fintan McCarthy*	14.40	2,440	2,547	2,691	2,923	3,036	3,454		
Labour	Eamon Tuffy*	10.48	1,774	1,807	1,873	2,019	2,095	2,338	2,363	3,110
Independent	Guss O'Connell	9.98	1,688	1,720	1,742	1,820	2,192	2,542	2,574	2,879
Sinn Féin	Feilim MacCriosta	9.11	1,542	1,552	1,580	1,640	1,755			
Fine Gael	Peter Brady	8.10	1,370	1,405	1,664	1,923	2,013	2,134	2,142	
Fianna Fáil	Des Kelly	7.42	1,255	1,274	1,399	1,588	2,066	2,175	2,179	2,607
Fianna Fáil	Deirdre Doherty-Ryan*	7.20	1,218	1,227	1,302	1,431				
Progressive Democrats	Jeff Aherne	6.49	1,098	1,127	1,233					
Fianna Fáil	Ed O'Brien	2.84	480	493						
Fine Gael	Joe MacEnri	2.22	376	384						
Electorate: 32,269 Valid: 16,921 (52.44%) Spoilt: 311 Quota: 3,385 Turnout: 17,232 (53.40%)

=== Tallaght Central ===
Tallaght Central - 5 seats
Party	Candidate	FPv%	Count								
Party	Candidate	FPv%	1	2	3	4	5	6	7	8	9
Socialist Party	Mick Murphy	16.10	2,505	2,552	2,654						
Sinn Féin	Mark Daly*	13.74	2,138	1,308	1,360	1,404	1,440	1,501	1,504	1,506	
Fine Gael	Karen Warren	10.44	1,624	1,702	1,808	1,863	1,898	1,933	2,052	2,415	2,423
Labour	Eamonn Maloney*	9.99	1,554	1,572	1,634	1,672	1,691	1,735	1,810	2,220	2,243
Labour	Don Tipping*	8.50	1,322	1,352	1,422	1,454	1,495	1,558	1,628		
Fianna Fáil	Joe Neville	8.37	1,302	1,396	1,421	1,741	1,784	1,828	2,437	2,561	2,567
Labour	Denis Mackin*	7.78	1,210	1,233	1,329	1,385	1,477	1,616	1,691	2,192	2,216
Sinn Féin	Seán O Cadhla	6.47	1,007	1,027	1,066	1,092					
Fianna Fáil	Roderick Smyth*	6.35	988	1,067	1,088	1,191	1,223	1,249			
Fianna Fáil	Margaret Farrell	4.52	703	735	760						
Green	Shauna Hutchinson-Edgar	4.17	648	710							
Progressive Democrats	Paula McCormack	3.57	556								
Electorate: 29,520 Valid: 15,557 (52.70%) Spoilt: 500 Quota: 2,593 Turnout: 16,057 (54.39%)

=== Tallaght South ===
Tallaght South - 5 seats
Party	Candidate	FPv%	Count									
Party	Candidate	FPv%	1	2	3	4	5	6	7	8	9	10
Fianna Fáil	John Hannon*	14.63	2,221	2,226	2,314	2,406	2,494	2,731				
Sinn Féin	Cathal King*	11.74	1,782	1,812	1,901	1,908	1,957	2,026	2,030	3,234		
Fianna Fáil	Jim Daly*	10.59	1,607	1,610	1,642	1,804	1,853	1,924	1,976	2,017	2,093	2,108
Labour	Marie Corr	9.77	1,483	1,500	1,538	1,587	1,793	2,055	2,101	2,204	2,433	2,565
Fianna Fáil	Mick Billane*	9.73	1,477	1,487	1,631	1,663	1,713	1,786	1,822	1,891	2,007	2,018
Sinn Féin	Brendan Ferron	9.68	1,469	1,484	1,520	1,532	1,624	1,716	1,721			
Labour	Caitriona Jones	9.45	1,435	1,454	1,479	1,542	1,814	2,324	2,361	2,489	2,693	
Fine Gael	Paul Ringland*	8.80	1,336	1,345	1,361	1,442	1,548					
Green	Elizabeth Davidson	6.59	1,000	1,041	1,063	1,125						
Progressive Democrats	Rita Hayes	3.91	594	599	609							
Fianna Fáil	Ambrose Sheilds	3.69	560	579								
Independent	Mark Luttrell	1.43	217									
Electorate: 34,251 Valid: 15,181 (44.32%) Spoilt: 538 Quota: 2,531 Turnout: 15,719 (45.89%)

=== Terenure-Rathfarnam ===
Terenure-Rathfarnam - 7 seats
Party	Candidate	FPv%	Count								
Party	Candidate	FPv%	1	2	3	4	5	6	7	8	9
Fianna Fáil	John Lahart*	13.14	3,828								
Progressive Democrats	Cáit Keane*	9.66	2,814	2,965	2,987	3,089	3,204	3,491	3,612	3,845	
Fine Gael	Stanley Laing*	8.55	2,490	2,559	2,568	2,676	3,139	3,263	3,340	3,534	3,588
Independent	Pat Dunne	7.57	2,207	2,250	2,252	2,308	2,323	2,362	2,718		
Fianna Fáil	Máire Ardagh*	7.42	2,161	2,607	2,650	2,694	2,723	3,333	3,490	3,703	
Labour	Alex White	7.24	2,109	2,143	2,149	2,413	2,507	2,617	2,773	2,994	3,011
Green	Tony McDermott	7.02	2,045	2,076	2,086	2,245	2,334	2,582	3,033	3,515	3,572
Fine Gael	Michael McLoughlin	6.68	1,947	1,964	1,977	2,054	2,667	2,747	2,807	2,876	2,889
Sinn Féin	Sorcha Nic Cormaic	6.44	1,876	1,913	1,919	1,989	2,010	2,082			
Labour	Éamonn Walsh*	6.19	1,803	1,853	1,855	2,303	2,375	2,429	2,734	3,455	3,496
Fianna Fáil	Vincent Kenny*	5.44	1,585	1,818	1,869	1,911	1,973				
Labour	Paddy Cosgrave	5.00	1,456	1,476	1,485						
Fianna Fáil	Alan Foran	4.17	1,215								
Electorate: 53,201 Valid: 29,139 (54.77%) Spoilt: 727 Quota: 3,643 Turnout: 29,866 (56.14%)
