= 2009 South Dublin County Council election =

Part of the 2009 Irish local elections

- 5 June 2009

All 26 seats on South Dublin County Council
	First party	Second party	Third party
Party	Labour	Fine Gael	Fianna Fáil
Seats won	9	8	4
Seat change	+2	+5	-2
	Fourth party	Fifth party	Sixth party
Party	Sinn Féin	People Before Profit	Independent
Seats won	3	1	1
Seat change	0	+1	-1
	Seventh party	Eighth party	Ninth party
Party	Green	Socialist Party	Progressive Democrats
Seats won	0	0	0
Seat change	-2	-1	-2
- Map showing the area of South Dublin County Council
Council control after election
TBD

An election to South Dublin County Council took place on 5 June 2009 as part of that year's Irish local elections. 26 councillors were elected from five local electoral areas using the Single transferable vote system for a five-year term of office.

== Results by party ==
Party	Seats	±	First Pref. votes	FPv%	±%
Labour	9	+2	21,813	24.13	
Fine Gael	8	+5	23,698	26.22	
Fianna Fáil	4	-2	15,290	16.92	
Sinn Féin	3	0	9,661	10.69	
People Before Profit	1	+1	5,721	6.33	
Independent	1	-1	7,997	8.85	
Green	0	-2	3,345	3.70	
Socialist Party	0	-1	2,159	2.39	
Progressive Democrats	0	-2	N/A	N/A	
Totals	26	0	90,389	100.00	—

== Results by local electoral area ==
=== Clondalkin ===
Clondalkin - 6 seats
Party	Candidate	FPv%	Count									
Party	Candidate	FPv%	1	2	3	4	5	6	7	8	9	10
Labour	Robert Dowds*	15.66	2,449									
Fine Gael	Tony Delaney*	11.03	1,725	1,754	1,780	1,792	1,916	2,018	2,057	2,258		
Fine Gael	Therese Ridge*	10.07	1,575	1,600	1,623	1,657	1,742	1,813	1,857	2,092	2,188	2,294
Sinn Féin	Matthew McDonagh	9.61	1,502	1,507	1,511	1,546	1,564	1,574	1,767	1,936	2,896	
Fianna Fáil	Jim Daly*	8.02	1,254	1,256	1,267	1,268	1,372	1,531	1,541	1,568	1,595	1,617
Sinn Féin	Shane O'Connor*	7.81	1,221	1,227	1,250	1,278	1,311	1,324	1,402	1,489		
People Before Profit	Gino Kenny	7.27	1,137	1,151	1,179	1,218	1,270	1,292	1,471	1,703	1,838	2,203
Fianna Fáil	Trevor Gilligan*	6.61	1,034	1,046	1,079	1,104	1,174	1,476	1,513	1,587	1,652	1,713
Labour	Margaret McCarthy	5.90	922	1,019	1,055	1,088	1,200	1,224	1,324			
Fianna Fáil	Thyes Kavanagh	4.69	734	740	762	769	792					
Green	Dorothy Corrigan*	4.37	683	690	718	725						
Independent	John McCann	4.21	658	663	692	897	917	932				
Independent	Mark Ward	2.62	410	413	453							
Independent	Jim McHale	1.14	179	182								
Independent	Gbemi Shogunle	0.97	151	152								
Electorate: 36,859 Valid: 15,634 (42.42%) Spoilt: 295 Quota: 2,234 Turnout: 15,929 (43.22%)

=== Lucan ===
Lucan - 5 seats
Party	Candidate	FPv%	Count										
Party	Candidate	FPv%	1	2	3	4	5	6	7	8	9	10	11
Fine Gael	Derek Keating*	26.88	4,146										
Independent	Guss O'Connell*	13.89	2,143	2,244	2,253	2,316	2,402	2,526	2,689				
Labour	Eamon Tuffy*	11.66	1,799	2,123	2,155	2,206	2,269	2,438	2,493	2,511	2,727		
Fine Gael	William Lavelle	8.47	1,307	1,939	1,957	2,022	2,057	2,122	2,191	2,207	2,340	2,608	
Fianna Fáil	Shane Moynihan	5.63	868	939	994	1,013	1,029	1,062	1,495	1,537	1,625	1,810	1,834
Labour	Caitriona Jones*	5.55	856	969	1,006	1,054	1,132	1,257	1,309	1,319	1,471	1,944	2,040
Fianna Fáil	Edno Cooney	4.89	754	783	940	946	968	985					
Green	Kevin Farrell	4.77	736	840	865	936	994	1,057	1,125	1,139	1,310		
Workers' Party	Mick Finnegan	4.57	705	745	752	774	871						
Independent	Jim Doyle	3.71	572	632	638	811	885	1,037	1,081	1,088			
Sinn Féin	Robert Ballesty	3.68	568	588	597	610							
Independent	Tom Dowling	3.39	523	587	594								
Fianna Fáil	Shaleem Ahmed	2.90	448	465									
Electorate: 30,945 Valid: 15,425 (49.85%) Spoilt: 178 Quota: 2,571 Turnout: 15,603 (50.42%)

=== Rathfarnam ===
Rathfarnam - 4 seats
Party	Candidate	FPv%	Count					
Party	Candidate	FPv%	1	2	3	4	5	6
Fine Gael	Cáit Keane*	21.01	3,639					
Fianna Fáil	John Lahart*	20.81	3,605					
Labour	Paddy Cosgrave*	19.80	3,431	3,460	3,482			
Fine Gael	Emma Coburn	17.44	3,022	3,138	3,158	3,230	3,330	3,516
Independent	Vincent Kenny	6.31	1,093	1,100	1,110	1,282	1,435	1,509
Green	Elizabeth Davidson	5.66	981	992	1,006	1,056	1,172	1,348
Fianna Fáil	John Phelan	3.45	597	603	670	687	720	
Sinn Féin	Sorcha Nic Cormaic	3.18	551	553	556	586		
Independent	Gerard Dolan	1.32	228	229	231			
Independent	Frank O'Gorman	1.02	177	179	181			
Electorate: 32,136 Valid: 17,324 (53.91%) Spoilt: 190 Quota: 3,465 Turnout: 17,514 (54.50%)

=== Tallaght Central ===
Tallaght Central - 6 seats
Party	Candidate	FPv%	Count								
Party	Candidate	FPv%	1	2	3	4	5	6	7	8	9
Labour	Mick Duff	13.15	3,125	3,151	3,206	3,287	3,373	3,460			
Fine Gael	Colm Brophy*	12.98	3,085	3,094	3,170	3,211	3,307	3,369	3,378	4,270	
Sinn Féin	Seán Crowe*	11.42	2,715	2,759	2,787	2,844	3,006	3,050	3,061	3,194	3,441
Labour	Pamela Kearns	11.12	2,643	2,664	2,733	2,808	2,925	2,986	2,998	3,181	3,275
Labour	Dermot Looney	9.80	2,329	2,346	2,382	2,418	2,849	2,894	2,902	3,105	3,318
Socialist Party	Mick Murphy*	9.08	2,159	2,205	2,226	2,320	2,628	2,684	2,692	2,883	2,940
Fianna Fáil	Eamonn Walsh	7.44	1,768	1,777	1,816	1,851	1,899	3,098	3,108	3,195	3,241
Fine Gael	Gay Kelly	7.02	1,668	1,682	1,706	1,737	1,794	1,848	1,854		
Fianna Fáil	Joe Neville*	6.65	1,580	1,594	1,621	1,653	1,700				
People Before Profit	Pat Dunne	5.56	1,346	1,357	1,404	1,495					
Independent	David Hutchinson-Edgar	2.36	562	630	655						
Green	Arthur Doohan	2.02	479	488							
Independent	Ray Kelly	1.30	309								
Electorate: 44,783 Valid: 23,768 (53.07%) Spoilt: 295 Quota: 3,396 Turnout: 24,063 (53.73%)

=== Tallaght South ===
Tallaght South - 5 seats
Party	Candidate	FPv%	Count							
Party	Candidate	FPv%	1	2	3	4	5	6	7	8
Labour	Eamonn Maloney*	15.40	2,344	2,377	2,445	2,499	2,540			
Sinn Féin	Cathal King*	15.19	2,312	2,347	2,376	2,427	2,981			
Fine Gael	Brian Lawlor	12.65	1,926	1,962	1,997	2,042	2,076	2,105	2,219	2,296
Labour	Marie Corr*	12.58	1,915	2,000	2,148	2,193	2,318	2,452	2,799	
Fine Gael	Karen Warren*	10.87	1,655	1,680	1,724	1,793	1,816	1,863	2,108	2,196
Fianna Fáil	John Hannon*	10.13	1,542	1,616	1,647	2,038	2,060	2,087	2,167	2,211
Independent	Baby Perrepadan	5.25	799	877	1,032	1,091	1,118	1,216		
Sinn Féin	Sinead Cooke	5.20	792	817	844	878				
Fianna Fáil	Tara de Buitlear	4.66	710	804	828					
Green	Tendai Madondo	4.18	636	674						
Fianna Fáil	Dermot Flanagan	2.60	396							
Independent	Frank O'Gorman	1.27	193							
Electorate: 35,234 Valid: 15,220 (43.20%) Spoilt: 217 Quota: 2,537 Turnout: 15,437 (43.81%)
