= Paul Gogarty =

Irish politician (born 1968)

Paul Gogarty TD
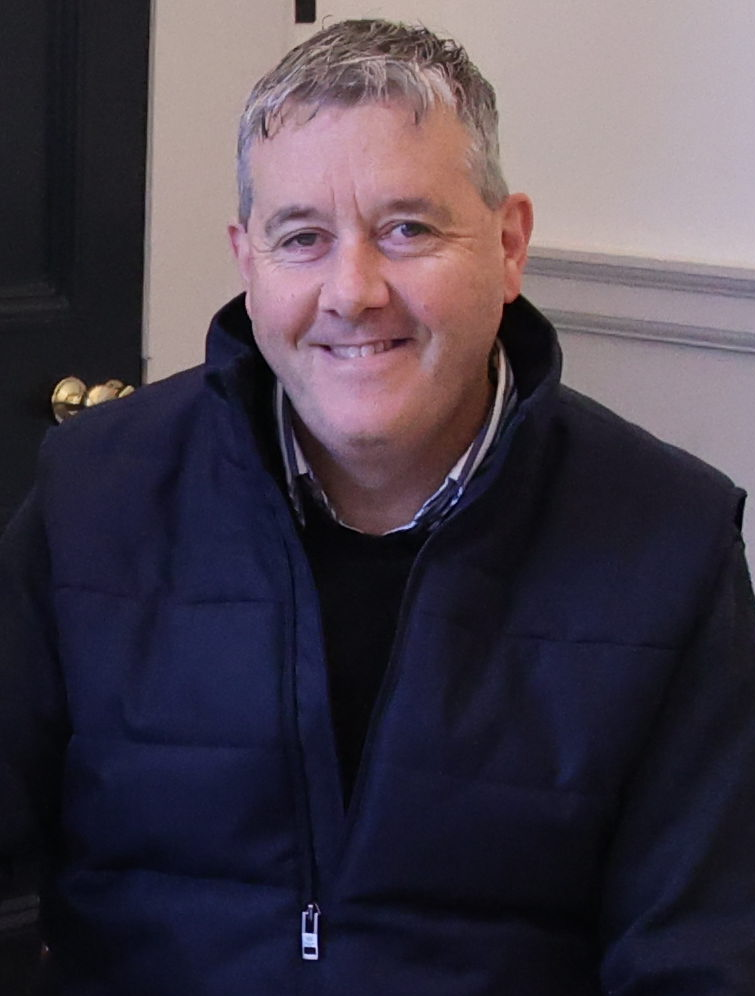
- Gogarty in 2024

Teachta Dála
- Incumbent
- Assumed office November 2024
- In office May 2002 – February 2011
- Constituency: Dublin Mid-West

South Dublin County Councillor
- In office 14 May 2014 – 1 December 2024
- Constituency: Lucan

Personal details
- Born: 20 December 1968 (age 57) Castlepollard, County Westmeath, Ireland
- Party: Independent
- Other political affiliations: Independent Alliance; Green Party (1989–2011)
- Education: Dublin Institute of Technology
- Website: paulgogarty.com

Paul Nicholas Gogarty (born 20 December 1968) is an Irish independent politician who has been a Teachta Dála (TD) for the Dublin Mid-West constituency since the 2024 general election. Gogarty was previously a South Dublin County Councillor for Lucan from May 2014 onwards. Before that, Gogarty was a member of the Green Party, and served as a Green TD for the Dublin Mid-West constituency from 2002 to 2011.

== Political career ==
=== Early local politics ===
Gogarty joined the Green Party in 1989 as a student. He ran unsuccessfully in the 1991 local elections for Fingal County Council. He was first elected at the 1999 local elections for the Lucan local electoral area of South Dublin County Council.

=== Dáil Éireann ===
Gogarty previously contested the 1992 and 1997 general elections in the Dublin West constituency. He also ran at the 1996 Dublin West by-election caused by the death of Brian Lenihan Snr. At the 2002 general election, he was elected to the Dáil for the new Dublin Mid-West constituency. He was the first Green Party member to be elected in a three-seat constituency. After his election, Gogarty gave up his local council seat, in line with Green Party policy against dual-mandate and was succeeded by the late Fintan McCarthy. At the 2007 general election, he retained his Dáil seat, taking the second seat in the enlarged constituency.

Following the Green Party's entry to government in 2007, Gogarty was appointed Chairman of the Oireachtas Committee on Education and Science.

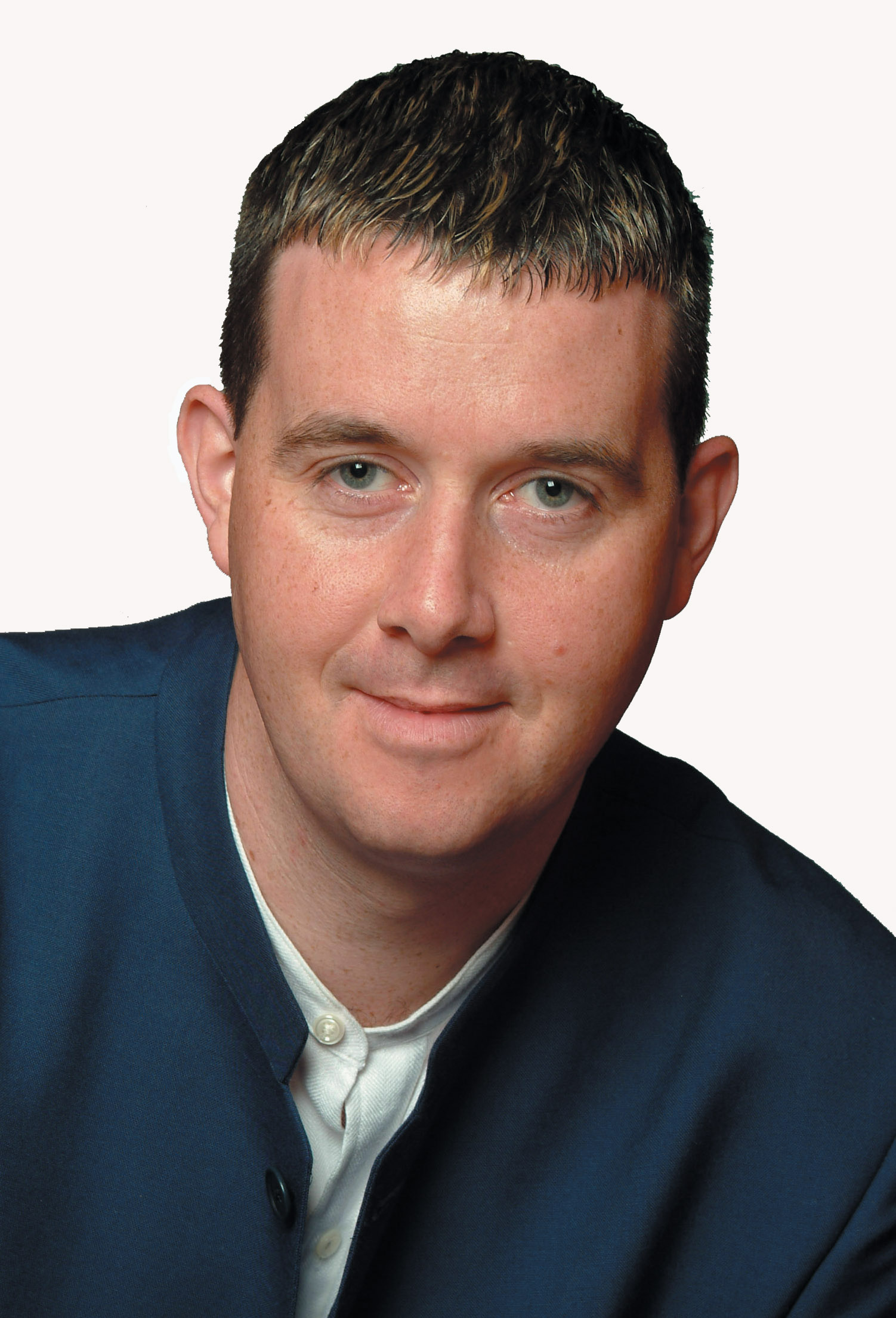
Gogarty in 2005

In 2002, 2003 and again in 2008, Gogarty called for the pay of members of the Oireachtas to be cut. In November 2003, he described the decision to raise TDs pay by 13% during the Celtic Tiger era, compared with 6% for pensioners and social welfare recipients as a "urination" on the less well off in society.

On 3 August 2010, Gogarty wrote to the Clerk of the Seanad asking that newspaper claims alleging that Senator Ivor Callely had supplied phone expenses claims on headed paper belonging to a company which no longer existed be investigated. Gogarty appeared on the RTÉ Joe Duffy radio show discussing this issue. He went to Lucan Garda station the next day and requested an investigation.

In November 2010, he brought his 18-month-old daughter to a Green Party press conference. The following day, many callers to a radio show criticised his decision. He responded that his regular child minder was not available when the press conference was called.

Gogarty's work in protecting educational investment during a period of cutbacks has been widely reported in the media, including a profile in The Irish Times in November 2010, which claimed that his contribution was recognised by admirers and detractors alike.

==== 2009 swearing incident ====
On 11 December 2009, during his contribution to a debate in the Dáil on the Social Welfare bill of the 2010 budget, Gogarty said to Labour Party TD Emmet Stagg: "With all due respect, in the most unparliamentary language, fuck you Deputy Stagg! Fuck you!" He immediately apologised to the House for his use of unparliamentary language, which was criticised by Deputy Lucinda Creighton, who demanded his suspension. The incident was referred to a sitting of the Dáil committee on procedure and privileges, when it emerged that "fuck" is not included among the list of forbidden words set out in the Salient Rulings of the Chair, the document which regulates the behaviour and conduct of TDs. Gogarty later clarified that the outburst was totally unintentional and not premeditated as some had suggested. He also said that the outburst had to be taken in the context of his contribution during the debate that day as well as a very turbulent and heated debate the previous night.

==== Loss of seat and return to local politics ====
Gogarty lost his seat at the 2011 general election, polling 3.47% of the first-preference votes and losing his right to reclaim election expenses.

Gogarty withdrew from politics until 2014 after losing his Dáil seat, and let his membership of the Green Party lapse. In early 2014, he decided to run for South Dublin County Council in local elections that June. He considered returning to the Green Party but ultimately ran a "low key campaign" as an independent. He was elected on the 11th count to the fourth of eight seats in the Lucan local electoral area.

In September 2015, Gogarty announced his intention to contest the 2016 general election as part of the Independent Alliance in the Dublin Mid-West constituency. He failed to be elected, receiving 5.9% of first preferences. He served as Mayor of South Dublin County Council from 2017 to 2018. He ran in the 2019 Dublin Mid-West by-election, finishing third with 12.7% FPV. He was also an unsuccessful candidate for Dublin Mid-West at the 2020 general election.

=== Return to national politics ===
Gogarty was a successful candidate at the 2024 Irish general election, securing a seat in Dublin Mid-West.

== Political views ==
Gogarty describes himself as a "liberal left-leaning" politician.

== Election results ==
Elections to Dublin County Council and South Dublin County Council
Party	Election		FPv	FPv%	Result
Green Party	Castleknock LEA	1991	391	5.3	Eliminated on count 6/11
Green Party	Lucan LEA	1999	1,238	14.7	Elected on count 5/7
Independent	Lucan LEA	2014	1,221	8.7	Elected on count 11/14
Independent	Lucan LEA	2019	1,509	15.8	Elected on count 4/11
Independent	Lucan LEA	2024	2,671	23.1	Elected on count 1/12

Elections to the Dáil
Party	Election		FPv	FPv%	Result
Green Party	Dublin West	1992	906	2.4	Eliminated on count 5/14
Green Party	Dublin West	1996 by-election	1,286	4.5	Eliminated on count 8/11
Green Party	Dublin West	1997	1,732	4.3	Eliminated on count 4/9
Green Party	Dublin Mid-West	2002	3,508	12.3	Elected on count 10/10
Green Party	Dublin Mid-West	2007	4,043	10.8	Elected on count 6/6
Green Party	Dublin Mid-West	2011	1,484	3.5	Eliminated on count 6/9
Independent Alliance	Dublin Mid-West	2016	2,522	5.9	Eliminated on count 10/12
Independent	Dublin Mid-West	2019 by-election	2,435	12.7	Eliminated on count 8/9
Independent	Dublin Mid-West	2020	2,950	6.5	Eliminated on count 8/9
Independent	Dublin Mid-West	2024	3,646	7.7	Elected on count 13/13

== Other activities ==
In June 2011, he spent four days filming at the "Charity ICA Bootcamp" in County Louth. The show was broadcast on RTÉ One the following August. He raised €5,000 for Pieta House, a suicide prevention and awareness charity. From July to November 2011, Gogarty was involved in season 4 of the RTÉ television series Celebrity Bainisteoir managing Oughterard's Seamus Ó Máille GAA Club, Galway. He was beaten by Tony Cascarino's team.

In August 2012, he released his debut single "Wishing on a Photograph" under the stage name of His Sweet Surprise. His third single "Know You All My Life" reached number one on the 7Digital Download Chart in January 2013. He released a music album on 17 February 2013.

Dáil	Election	Deputy (Party)	Deputy (Party)	Deputy (Party)	Deputy (Party)	Deputy (Party)
29th	2002	Paul Gogarty (GP)	3 seats 2002–2007	Mary Harney (PDs)	John Curran (FF)	4 seats 2002–2024
30th	2007	Paul Gogarty (GP)	Joanna Tuffy (Lab)	Mary Harney (PDs)	John Curran (FF)	4 seats 2002–2024
31st	2011	Robert Dowds (Lab)	Joanna Tuffy (Lab)	Frances Fitzgerald (FG)	Derek Keating (FG)	4 seats 2002–2024
32nd	2016	Gino Kenny (AAA–PBP)	Eoin Ó Broin (SF)	Frances Fitzgerald (FG)	John Curran (FF)	4 seats 2002–2024
32nd	2019 by-election	Gino Kenny (AAA–PBP)	Eoin Ó Broin (SF)	Mark Ward (SF)	John Curran (FF)	4 seats 2002–2024
33rd	2020	Gino Kenny (S–PBP)	Eoin Ó Broin (SF)	Mark Ward (SF)	Emer Higgins (FG)	4 seats 2002–2024
34th	2024	Paul Gogarty (Ind.)	Eoin Ó Broin (SF)	Mark Ward (SF)	Emer Higgins (FG)	Shane Moynihan (FF)
