= Gino Kenny =

Irish politician (born 1972)

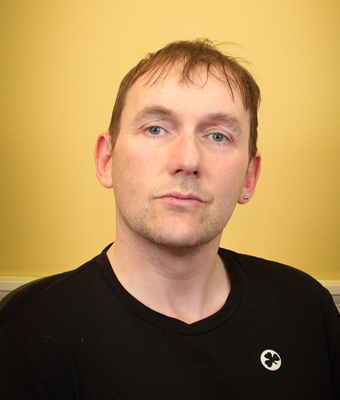
- Kenny in 2016

Teachta Dála
- In office February 2016 – November 2024
- Constituency: Dublin Mid-West

Personal details
- Born: Eugene Kenny; 25 June 1972 (age 54) Clondalkin, Dublin, Ireland
- Party: People Before Profit–Solidarity

Eugene "Gino" Kenny (born 25 June 1972) is an Irish People Before Profit–Solidarity politician who has served as a councillor on South Dublin County Council since April 2026. He was a TD for the Dublin Mid-West constituency from 2016 to 2024.

== Early life ==
He moved to Neilstown in 1979, where he lives with his partner. Before entering politics he worked as a carer for the elderly in several hospitals, having acquired a Masters' in public health studies.

== Political career ==
Kenny joined the Socialist Workers Party in 1994; a 2001 article in The Echo noted his involvement in anti-globalisation protests at the 27th G8 summit in Italy.

=== South Dublin County Council ===
During the 2000s, Kenny was the spokesperson for the Mast Action Clondalkin group, campaigning for the removal of a phone mast in Ronanstown. He unsuccessfully contested the 2004 elections to South Dublin County Council in the Clondalkin local area for the Socialist Workers Party, but was elected in 2009 for People Before Profit, remaining on the council until his election as a TD in 2016. During his election campaign in 2009, he was ordered to pay compensation after being caught spraying "Israel wanted for murder" on the Mill Shopping Centre complex in Clondalkin.

While a member of South Dublin County Council, Kenny was involved in a campaign supporting workers from waste company Greyhound, who had been in an industrial dispute over pay cuts; in 2014 Kenny had an injunction taken against him by Greyhound, preventing him from obstructing bin collections.

In February 2026, it was announced that Kenny would return to his previous seat on South Dublin County Council in April of that year, replacing the resigning councillor Darragh Adelaide.

=== Dáil Éireann ===
He was elected to Dáil Éireann on his third attempt in February 2016, becoming the first person from Neilstown to be elected to the Dáil. He had previously contested the general elections of 2007 and 2011, finishing ahead of sitting TD Paul Gogarty in the latter.

After being elected to the Dáil in 2016, he put forward a Private Member's Bill to legalise the medicinal use of cannabis. After this bill was rejected when an Oireachtas Committee described it as having "too many flaws", he called the Dáil a "kip."

In May 2018 he accused Minister of State for Defence Paul Kehoe of having "blood on his hands" after the government purchased 4 unmanned aerial vehicles from an Israeli manufacturer. Kenny suggested it was immoral for the Irish state to purchase military equipment from Israel because of questions over its civil rights record. Kehoe responded by saying the purchased UAVs had no offensive capacity and that the manufacturer had won the bid on the contract, and said that bids were open to any company not sanctioned or barred by the EU, UN or OSCE.

After looking set to lose his seat at the 2020 general election and having conceded prematurely, Kenny retained it by unseating John Curran of Fianna Fáil, in what RTÉ described as his "resurrection" and "one of the stories of this election".

In October 2020, Kenny sponsored a "Dying with Dignity" bill in the Dáil that proposed legalising assisted suicide in Ireland, an area he has been campaigning on for some time. It passed 81 votes to 71 following the government allowing a free vote on the matter. Following the vote, the Bill has moved to the committee stage.

In November 2022, Kenny introduced a bill in the Dáil that would legalise cannabis for personal use and possession of up to seven grams of cannabis.

Kenny lost his seat at the 2024 general election.

Dáil	Election	Deputy (Party)	Deputy (Party)	Deputy (Party)	Deputy (Party)	Deputy (Party)
29th	2002	Paul Gogarty (GP)	3 seats 2002–2007	Mary Harney (PDs)	John Curran (FF)	4 seats 2002–2024
30th	2007	Paul Gogarty (GP)	Joanna Tuffy (Lab)	Mary Harney (PDs)	John Curran (FF)	4 seats 2002–2024
31st	2011	Robert Dowds (Lab)	Joanna Tuffy (Lab)	Frances Fitzgerald (FG)	Derek Keating (FG)	4 seats 2002–2024
32nd	2016	Gino Kenny (AAA–PBP)	Eoin Ó Broin (SF)	Frances Fitzgerald (FG)	John Curran (FF)	4 seats 2002–2024
32nd	2019 by-election	Gino Kenny (AAA–PBP)	Eoin Ó Broin (SF)	Mark Ward (SF)	John Curran (FF)	4 seats 2002–2024
33rd	2020	Gino Kenny (S–PBP)	Eoin Ó Broin (SF)	Mark Ward (SF)	Emer Higgins (FG)	4 seats 2002–2024
34th	2024	Paul Gogarty (Ind.)	Eoin Ó Broin (SF)	Mark Ward (SF)	Emer Higgins (FG)	Shane Moynihan (FF)
