= Teresa Costello =

Irish politician

Senator Teresa Costello
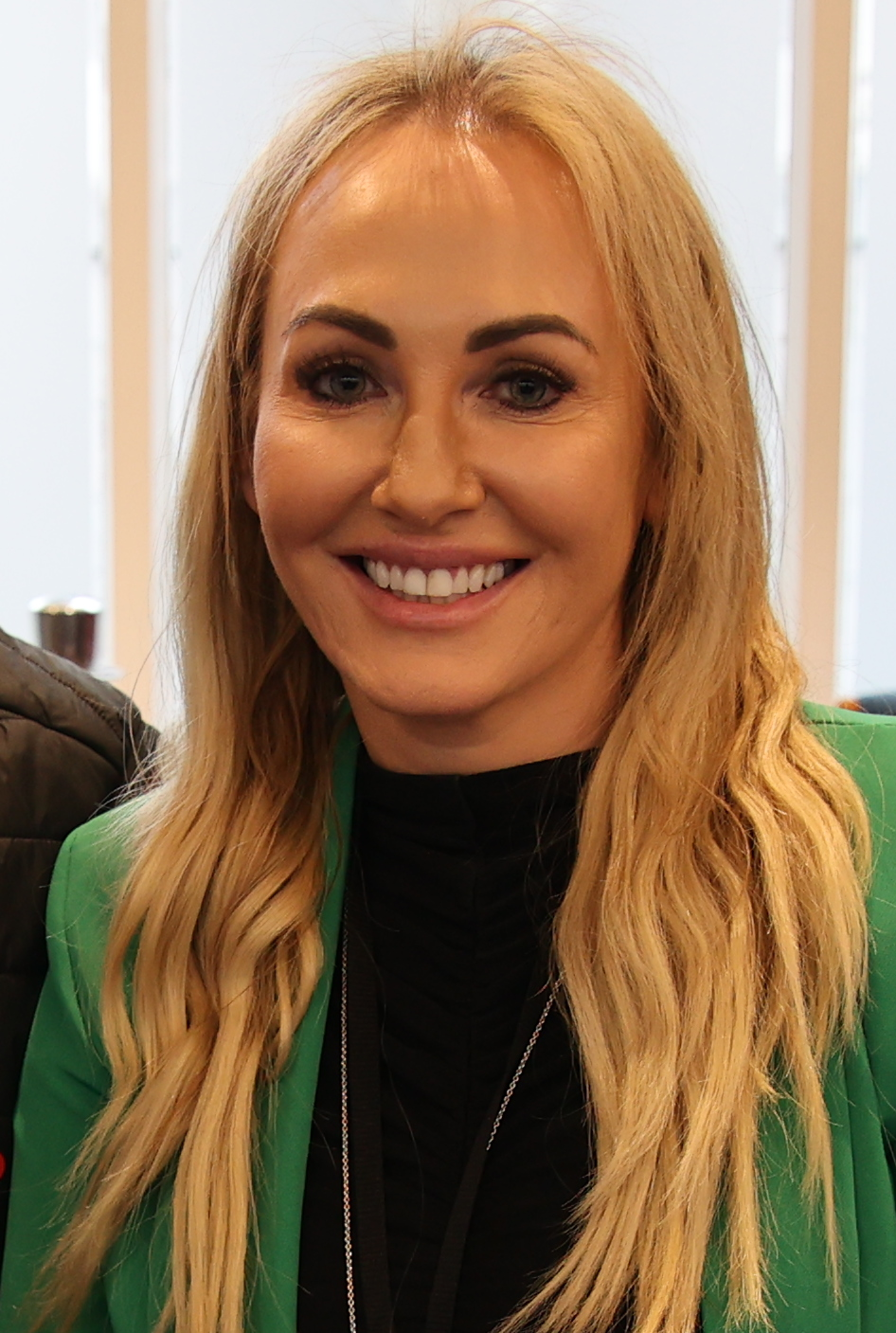
- Costello in 2025

Senator
- Incumbent
- Assumed office January 2025
- Constituency: Agricultural Panel

Personal details
- Born: 1976/1977 (age 48–49)
- Party: Fianna Fáil

Teresa Costello (born 1976/1977) is an Irish Fianna Fáil politician who has been a senator for the Agricultural Panel since January 2025.

Before politics, Costello worked at UDG Healthcare. She was a member of South Dublin County Council for the Tallaght Central area from May 2019 to January 2025. She was an unsuccessful candidate at the 2024 general election for the Dublin South-West constituency.

Costello is a survivor of breast cancer.
