= Therese Ridge =

Irish politician (born 1941)

Senator
- In office 17 September 1997 – 12 September 2002
- Constituency: Labour Panel

Personal details
- Born: 1 March 1941 (age 85) Dublin, Ireland
- Party: Fine Gael (1985–2012)
- Other political affiliations: Independent (2012–2014)
- Education: St Patrick's College, Maynooth

Therese Ridge (born 1 March 1941) is an Irish former politician from Clondalkin, County Dublin. Formerly a member of Fine Gael, she was an Independent member of South Dublin County Council from 2012 to 2014.

== Early life ==
Born in Dublin, Ridge was educated at Goldenbridge College, Dublin and at St Patrick's College, Maynooth, where she graduated with an MA. She worked as a Montessori teacher and then as an external tutor at Maynooth Adult Education Department and at Stewarts Hospital in Palmerstown.

== Political career ==
She was an elected member of South Dublin County Council from the county's establishment in 1994 to 2014, and was chair of the council from 1996 to 1997. She previously represented the same Clondalkin area on the former Dublin County Council, to which she was elected in 1985 and which she chaired from 1992 to 1993.

Ridge stood three times as a Fine Gael candidate for Dáil Éireann, but was unsuccessful on each occasion: in Dublin South-West at the 1987 general election, in Dublin West at the 1992 general election and in Dublin Mid-West at the 2002 general election.

She stood unsuccessfully at the 1989 and 1993 elections to Seanad Éireann by the Labour Panel, but won a seat at the 1997 election to the 21st Seanad. She was defeated at the 2002 Seanad elections.

== Mahon Tribunal ==
Lobbyist Frank Dunlop, whose allegations of corruption in the rezoning of land in County Dublin were based on his own involvement in much of the alleged wrongdoing, claimed in 2000 that he had paid 16 councillors involved in rezoning decisions, including that on the Quarryvale site in west Dublin. Fine Gael's then leader John Bruton established an internal inquiry into the allegations, which reported in May 2000 that while Ridge had received donations from developers (including two payments of £500 each from Dunlop), it was "satisfied that Ms. Ridge did not allow the payments which she received to influence her decision to vote on any of these three motions".

In November 2007, Dunlop told the tribunal had persuaded councillors to arrange the seating at a county council meeting to ensure that Fine Gael councillor Peter Brady could be prompted by Ridge to vote in favour of a motion on Quarryvale. Dunlop told the tribunal that he was in the public gallery at the time of the vote and heard Ridge say to her colleague "for, Peter, for" when the time came for him to cast his vote.

On 10 May 2012, Ridge lost the Fine Gael party whip as a result of the complete findings of the Mahon Tribunal which found that she acted "entirely improperly" by accepting a donation of £1,000 cash from Frank Dunlop during the 1992 general election. On 6 July 2012, she resigned from the Fine Gael party. She said that she was not appealing against the ruling of the party disciplinary committee, and was leaving because she could not get fair procedures.
