= South Dublin County Council =

Local authority of South Dublin, Ireland

South Dublin County Council Comhairle Contae Átha Cliath Theas
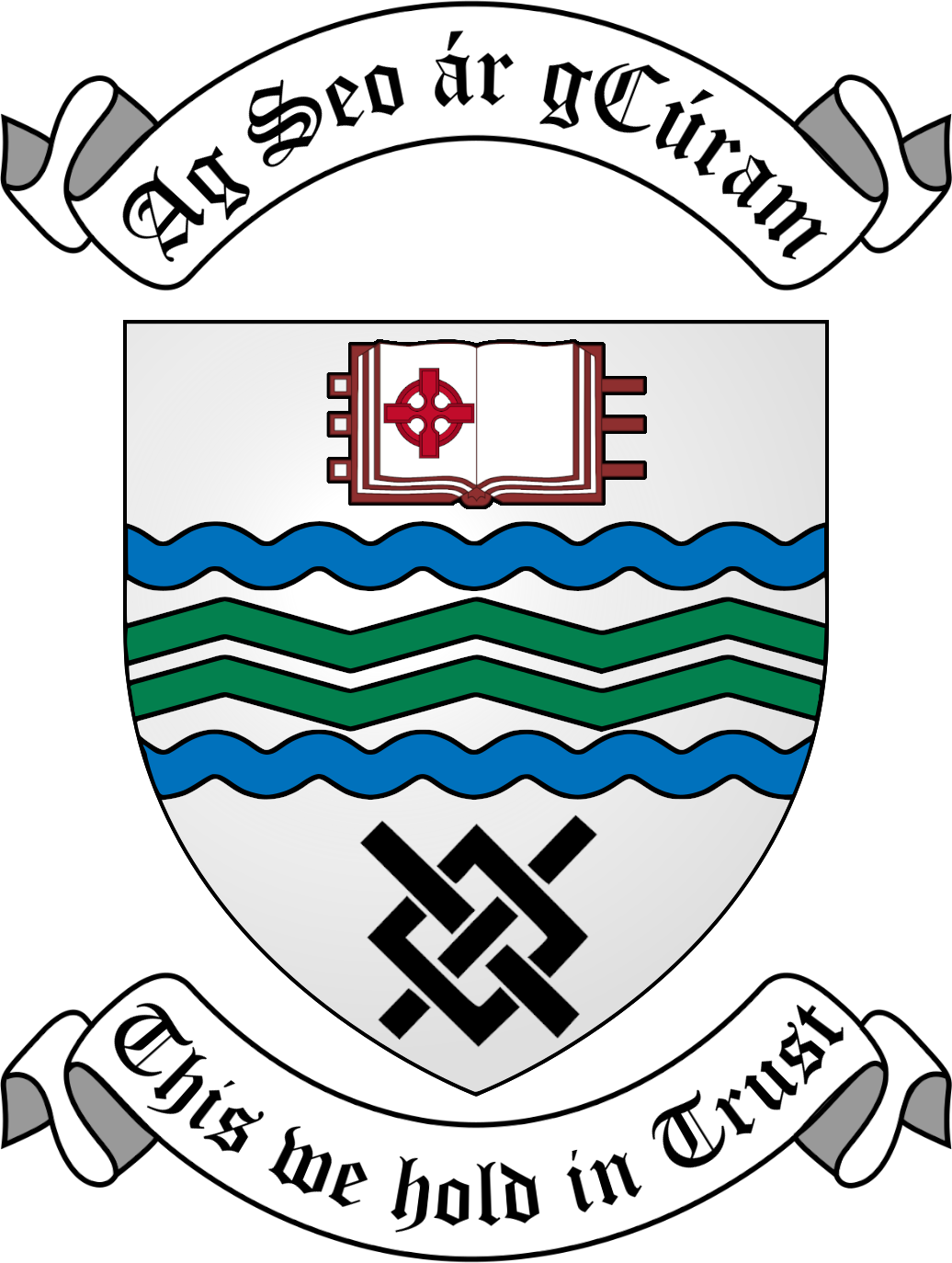

Type
- Type: County council of South Dublin

History
- Founded: 1 January 1994

Leadership
- Mayor: Francis Timmons, Ind

Structure
- Seats: 40
- Political groups: Fine Gael (9) Fianna Fáil (5) Sinn Féin (5) PBP–Solidarity (3) Labour (3) Social Democrats (2) Independent Ireland (1) Independent (12)

Elections
- Last election: 7 June 2024

Meeting place
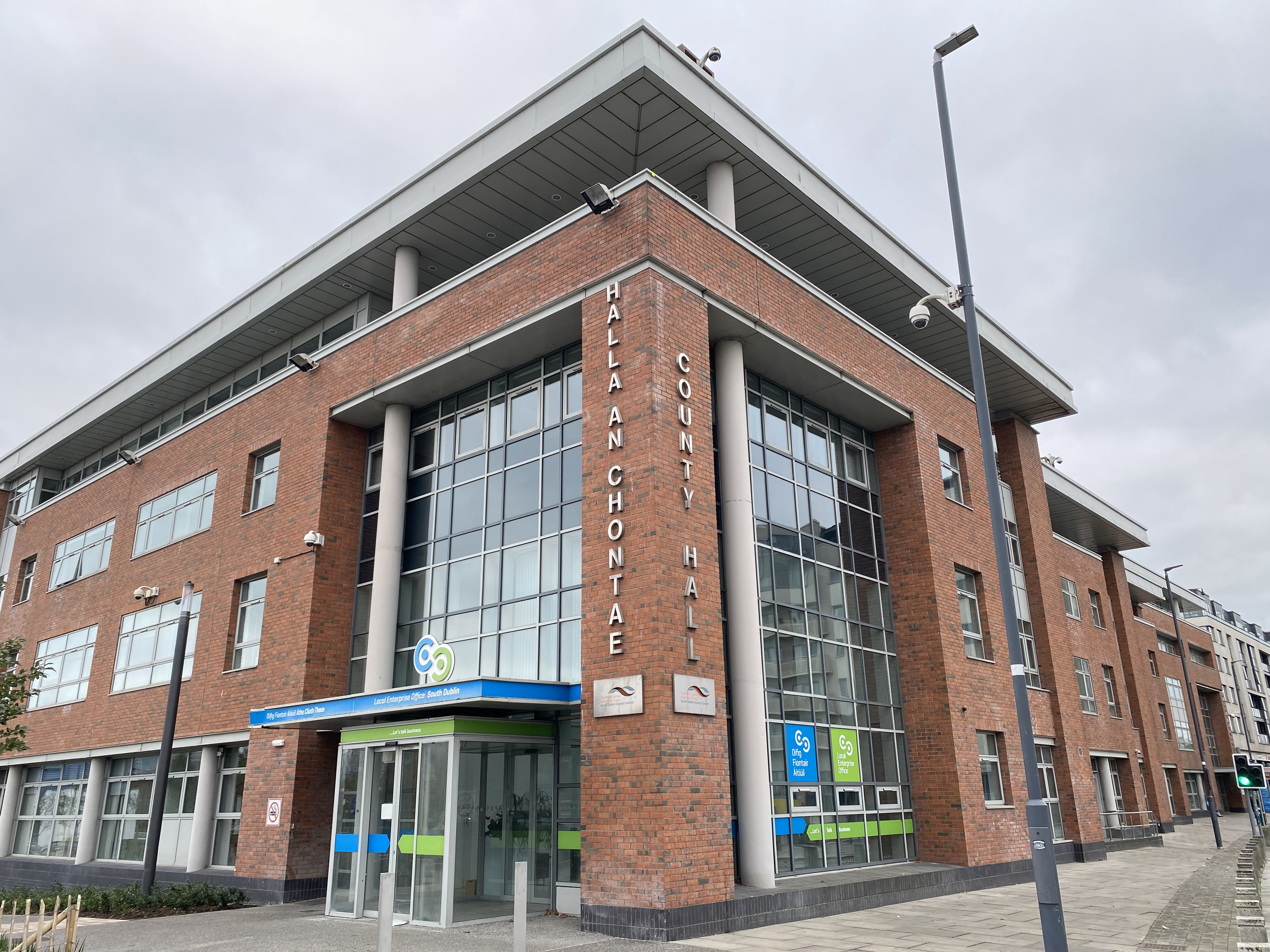
- County Hall, Tallaght

Website
- Official website

Location of South Dublin in Ireland

South Dublin County Council (Irish: Comhairle Contae Átha Cliath Theas) is the local authority of the county of South Dublin, Ireland. It is one of three local authorities created by the Local Government (Dublin) Act 1993 to succeed the former Dublin County Council before its abolition on 1 January 1994 and one of four councils in County Dublin. As a county council, it is governed by the Local Government Act 2001. The council is responsible for housing and community, roads and transportation, urban planning and development, amenity and culture, and environment. The council has 40 elected members. Elections are held every five years and are by single transferable vote. The head of the council has the title of Mayor. The county administration is headed by a chief executive, Colm Ward. The county town is Tallaght, with a civic centre at Ninth Lock Road, Clondalkin. It serves a population of approximately 192,000.

The council is the third largest local authority in Ireland with a population of 265,205 (Census 2011), 90,000 households, and 6,000 businesses, covering an area of 222.74 square kilometres. There are 183,336 local government electors and 174,349 Dáil electors registered to vote in the County Council administrative area.

== History ==
The council of the electoral county of Dublin—Belgard was established in 1985 with 26 members. Its members also sat as members of Dublin County Council. At the 1991 local election, the electoral county was renamed South Dublin.

On 1 January 1994, under the Local Government (Dublin) Act 1993, County Dublin and Dublin County Council ceased to exist and South Dublin County Council came into being.

The county council initially met in the Regional Technical College, Tallaght. A new building, County Hall, was purpose-built for the county council and was completed in 1994.

== Legal status ==
The Local Government Act 2001 reformed the two-tier structure of local government in Ireland, although South Dublin had no second-tier areas. It confirmed the size of the council as 26 members. Following the Local Government Reform Act 2014 this number was increased to 40 members as part of a nationwide reallocation of local authority membership numbers.

The Local Government Act 1994 defines how an authority may act. The local authority may provide amenities, facilities and services related to; artistic and cultural activities, sports, games and similar activities, general recreational and leisure activities, civic improvements, environmental and heritage protection and improvement, and the public use of amenities. It may also act as a library authority.

== Governance ==
=== Management ===
The Corporate Policy Group (CPG) consists of the Mayor together with the Chairs of each of the Strategic Policy Committees (SPC). The CPG is supported by the County Manager. Its function is to co-ordinate the work of the Committees so that policy decisions can be discussed and agreed for recommendation to the full council. "The CPG acts as a sort of Cabinet for the council and is supported by the County Manager."

==== Mayor and Deputy Mayor ====
The Mayor and Deputy Mayor are chosen from among the councillors.

== Regional Assembly ==
South Dublin County Council has three representatives on the Eastern and Midland Regional Assembly who are part of the Dublin Strategic Planning Area Committee.

== Elections ==
Members of South Dublin County Council are elected for a five-year term of office on the electoral system of proportional representation by means of the single transferable vote (PR-STV) from multi-member local electoral areas (LEAs).

Year	FG	FF	SF	PBP	Lab	SD	II	IF	GP	Sol	WP	PDs	Ind.	Total
2024	9	5	5	4	3	2	1	1	0	0	0	—N/a	10	40
2019	7	8	6	1	2	1	—N/a	—N/a	4	2	0	—N/a	9	40
2014	7	5	9	3	4	—N/a	—N/a	—N/a	1	3	0	—N/a	8	40
2009	8	4	3	1	9	—N/a	—N/a	—N/a	0	0	0	0	1	26
2004	3	6	3	—N/a	7	—N/a	—N/a	—N/a	2	1	0	2	2	26
1999	3	8	2	—N/a	7	—N/a	—N/a	—N/a	1	0	0	2	3	26
1991	6	7	0	—N/a	4	—N/a	—N/a	—N/a	1	—N/a	3	4	1	26
1985	8	13	0	—N/a	2	—N/a	—N/a	—N/a	0	—N/a	2	—N/a	1	26

== Local electoral areas ==
South Dublin is divided into LEAs. These are defined by electoral divisions which were defined in 1986, with minor amendments in 1994. The most recent polling scheme was published in 2020.

LEA	Definition	Seats
Clondalkin	Clondalkin-Dunawley, Clondalkin Village, Newcastle, Rathcoole, Saggart; that part of the electoral division of Clondalkin-Monastery west of a line drawn along the M50 motorway; and those parts of the electoral divisions of Clondalkin-Cappaghmore and Clondalkin-Moorfield south of a line drawn along the South Western Commuter and Intercity railway line	7
Firhouse–Bohernabreena	Bohernabreena, Edmondstown, Firhouse-Ballycullen, Firhouse-Knocklyon and Firhouse Village	5
Lucan	Lucan-St Helens, Lucan Heights; and that part of the electoral division of Lucan Esker not contained in the local electoral area of Palmerstown-Fonthill	5
Palmerstown–Fonthill	Clondalkin-Rowlagh, Palmerston Village, Palmerston West; those parts of the electoral divisions of Clondalkin-Cappaghmore and Clondalkin-Moorfield not contained in the local electoral area of Clondalkin;and that part of the electoral division of Lucan Esker to the east of a line drawn along the R136 Road	5
Rathfarnham–Templeogue	Ballyboden, Rathfarnham-Ballyroan, Rathfarnham-Butterfield, Rathfarnham-Hermitage, Rathfarnham-St. Endas, Rathfarnham Village, Templeogue-Cypress, Templeogue-Kimmage Manor, Templeogue-Limekiln, Templeogue-Orwell, Templeogue-Osprey, Templeogue Village, Terenure-Cherryfield, Terenure-Greentrees and Terenure-St. James;those parts of the electoral divisions of Clondalkin-Ballymount, Clondalkin-Monastery and Tallaght-Kilnamanagh east of a line drawn along the M50 motorway	7
Tallaght Central	Tallaght-Avonbeg, Tallaght-Belgard, Tallaght-Glenview, Tallaght-Kingswood, Tallaght-Millbrook, Tallaght-Oldbawn, Tallaght-Springfield, Tallaght-Tymon;those parts of the electoral divisions of Clondalkin-Ballymount and Tallaght-Kilnamanagh not contained in the local electoral area of Rathfarnham-Templeogue; and that part of the electoral division of Tallaght-Kiltipper to the east of a line drawn along Kiltipper Way	6
Tallaght South	Ballinascorney, Tallaght-Fettercairn, Tallaght-Jobstown, Tallaght-Killinardan; and that part of the electoral division of Tallaght-Kiltipper not contained in the local electoral area of Tallaght Central	5

== Councillors ==
=== 2024 seats summary ===
The following were elected at the 2024 South Dublin County Council election.

Party	Seats
Fine Gael	9
Fianna Fáil	5
Sinn Féin	5
PBP–Solidarity	4
Labour	3
Social Democrats	2
Independent Ireland	1
Irish Freedom	1
Independent	10

=== Councillors by electoral area ===
This list reflects the order in which councillors were elected on 7 June 2024.

Council members from 2024 election
Local electoral area	Name	Party
Clondalkin	Francis Timmons (Note: Changed party, see table below for details.)	Independent
Clondalkin	William Carey	Sinn Féin
Clondalkin	Darragh Adelaide (Note: Replaced during term, see table below for details.)	PBP–Solidarity
Clondalkin	Trevor Gilligan	Fianna Fáil
Clondalkin	Shirley O'Hara	Fine Gael
Clondalkin	Linda de Courcy	Independent Ireland
Clondalkin	Eoin Ó Broin	Social Democrats
Firhouse–Bohernabreena	Alan Edge	Independent
Firhouse–Bohernabreena	Brian Lawlor	Fine Gael
Firhouse–Bohernabreena	Emma Murphy	Fianna Fáil
Firhouse–Bohernabreena	Sarah Barnes	Fine Gael
Firhouse–Bohernabreena	Róisín Mannion	Sinn Féin
Lucan	Paul Gogarty	Independent
Lucan	Vicki Casserly	Fine Gael
Lucan	Liona O'Toole	Independent
Lucan	Caroline Brady	Fine Gael
Lucan	Joanna Tuffy	Labour
Palmerstown–Fonthill	Shane Moynihan	Fianna Fáil
Palmerstown–Fonthill	Alan Hayes	Independent
Palmerstown–Fonthill	Niamh Fennell	Sinn Féin
Palmerstown–Fonthill	Glen Moore	Irish Freedom
Palmerstown–Fonthill	Madeleine Johansson	PBP–Solidarity
Rathfarnham–Templeogue	Pamela Kearns	Labour
Rathfarnham–Templeogue	Ronan McMahon	Independent
Rathfarnham–Templeogue	Ciarán Ahern	Labour
Rathfarnham–Templeogue	Yvonne Collins	Fianna Fáil
Rathfarnham–Templeogue	Lynn McCrave	Fine Gael
Rathfarnham–Templeogue	David McManus	Fine Gael
Rathfarnham–Templeogue	Justin Sinnott	Social Democrats
Tallaght Central	Mick Duff	Independent
Tallaght Central	Teresa Costello	Fianna Fáil
Tallaght Central	Britto Pereppadan	Fine Gael
Tallaght Central	Paddy Holohan	Independent
Tallaght Central	Jess Spear	PBP–Solidarity
Tallaght Central	Niamh Whelan	Sinn Féin
Tallaght South	Paddy Holohan	Independent
Tallaght South	Baby Pereppaddan	Fine Gael
Tallaght South	Dermot Richardson	Independent
Tallaght South	Kay Keane	PBP–Solidarity
Tallaght South	Louise Dunne	Sinn Féin

==== Co-options ====
Party	Outgoing	LEA	Reason	Date	Co-optee
Independent	Paddy Holohan	Tallaght Central	Elected for two areas; Tallaght Central and Tallaght South, resigned from Tallaght Central.	September 2024	Dean Donnelly
Fianna Fáil	Shane Moynihan	Palmerstown–Fonthill	Elected to 34th Dáil at the 2024 general election	19 December 2024	Jacqueline Sheehy
Labour	Ciarán Ahern	Rathfarnham–Templeogue	Elected to 34th Dáil at the 2024 general election	19 December 2024	Paddy Cosgrave
Independent	Paul Gogarty	Lucan	Elected to 34th Dáil at the 2024 general election	19 December 2024	Helen Farrell
Fianna Fáil	Teresa Costello	Tallaght Central	Elected to 27th Seanad at the 2025 Seanad election	31 January 2025	Adam Smyth
PBP–Solidarity	Darragh Adelaide	Clondalkin	Resignation	25 February 2026	Gino Kenny
Fianna Fáil	Jacqueline Sheehy	Palmerstown–Fonthill	Resignation	9 March 2026	Tanya McDonald
Sinn Féin	Niamh Fennell	Palmerstown–Fonthill	Emigrated to Australia	28 May 2026	Daniel Loftus

==== Changes in affiliation ====
Name	LEA	Elected as	New affiliation	Date
Francis Timmons	Clondalkin	Independent	Labour	25 October 2024
Francis Timmons	Clondalkin	Labour	Independent	13 December 2024
Glen Moore	Palmerstown–Fonthill	Irish Freedom	Independent	28 February 2025
Madeleine Johansson	Palmerstown–Fonthill	PBP–Solidarity	Independent	9 June 2025

== Controversies ==
=== 2019 wetlands destruction ===
In 2019, South Dublin County Council sanctioned the mass dumping of silt in a wetlands park which it had previously vowed to protect. A large part of the park's ecosystem was destroyed, buried under several feet of silt which was then leveled with heavy machinery. The destruction enraged environmental groups, who estimated that thousands of animals were buried and killed, including several protected and endangered species. In response, the council confirmed that they would review their silt disposal process, while admitting no wrongdoing.
