= Local Government (Dublin) Act 1993 =

Act which created three counties in place of County Dublin

The Local Government (Dublin) Act 1993 was an Act passed by the Oireachtas. It abolished the County Dublin and awarded county status to:

- Dún Laoghaire–Rathdown and established Dún Laoghaire–Rathdown County Council,
- South Dublin and established South Dublin County Council and
- Fingal and established Fingal County Council.

These new administrative counties have all the powers and institutions of the traditional counties.

Section 9 Part 1(a) states that on the establishment day (1 January 1994) the previous county of Dublin "shall cease to exist."

Section 15 Part 2 dissolved the former Dún Laoghaire Corporation.

The Bill had been proposed by the Minister for the Environment, Michael Smith.

== See also ==
- Politics of the Republic of Ireland
- History of the Republic of Ireland
- History of Dublin
