= JobBridge =

Internship scheme in Ireland

JobBridge was a national internship scheme formulated in 2011 by the government of Ireland.

== Format ==
JobBridge's stated aim was to "assist in breaking the cycle where jobseekers were unable to get a job without experience." €50 was added to the trainee's weekly unemployment allowance. In an attempt to prevent abuse, employers could not have laid anyone off within three months prior to signing up for the scheme and trainees must had been on the live register for three months or more.

As of August 2011, 1,285 internships had been listed on the scheme's website, with a further 500 being vetted for listing, 473 interns had been selected and 292 had started their programs. On 9 August 2011 the National Economic and Social Council called for the scheme to be expanded beyond the initial 5000 internships originally planned in order to make a bigger difference to unemployment.

On 22 May 2016, it was announced by Social Protection Minister Leo Varadkar, that the internship scheme was to be discontinued after five years. Varadkar said that he was going to replace the JobBridge internship scheme with a more targeted scheme in 2017. This announcement came a week after Minister of State for Training and Skills John Halligan called for the controversial scheme to be cut.

On 21 October 2016, the JobBridge scheme was officially closed down.

== History ==
JobBridge attracted criticism from campaign groups, politicians and trainees alike. The Work Must Pay campaign, a network of trade union activists and members of political groups, was active from 2014 to 2015 and called for an end to all free labour schemes such as JobBridge. The Work Must Pay campaign put pressure on employers that advertised for unpaid interns through JobBridge to end their involvement in the scheme by protesting outside their businesses. Disability rights organisations, including the Association for Higher Education Access and Disability (Ahead) and The Irish Wheelchair Association, had in the past criticised JobBridge for excluding people with disabilities who were in receipt of disability allowance.

All of Ireland's opposition political parties spoke out against JobBridge. Fianna Fáil called for the abolition of JobBridge to end the "exploitation of young Irish people by the programme". Sinn Féin leader Gerry Adams accused the government of massaging unemployment figures through "forced labour" schemes like JobBridge and Gateways. Former Socialist Party MEP Paul Murphy said "the taxpayer is subsidising free labour for big companies as well as the exploitation of the interns themselves". He criticised car repair firm Advance Pitstop for seeking to hire 28 interns through the scheme, which he claimed would save it €377,000 compared to the cost of hiring full-time staff. Joe O'Connor, USI President, said that while the USI believed there was a need for quality internships and real upskilling opportunities for young people in Ireland, it was clear that JobBridge was "broken beyond repair." "Any internship scheme should be properly monitored and regulated and should not displace fully paid labour. Clearly, JobBridge is failing in that respect, and we believe it should be brought to an end."

Ireland's former social affairs minister Joan Burton, meanwhile, considered the scheme to have been a success. She said that a further 1,000 internships would be provided for and claimed on 9 May 2012 that 38% of those on JobBridge (797 people) had gone on to full-time employment. At first sight, that looked like a qualified success, but at closer inspection, it became clear that JobBridge failed to provide proper jobs for the unemployed. The government's Indecon report showed that 59% of people did not complete their internships. The government euphemistically referred to them as internships that ‘were ended before their scheduled timeframe', or as 'early-completers'. The government claimed that nearly 60% of internships resulted in employment.

"JobBridge is not just an attack on those seeking work but also part of a much broader attempt to reduce the pay and conditions of workers in all sectors of the economy," commented CWU Youth Committee Chair, Derek Keenan. "The scheme has depressed real job creation by allowing employers to avail of a free labour pool of unemployed workers desperate to get a foothold within the labour market. This abuse must cease; everyone deserves to be paid for their labour and we are calling on the government to phase out the scheme," he added.

A Republic of Telly sketch compared JobBridge with the Oscar-winning film 12 Years a Slave. The sketch compared the government's JobBridge scheme to slavery, "Why don't they just create real jobs" and "I thought the whole point of an internship was that you had a job at the end?"

In September 2014, there was controversy over the scheme's use for hiring school cleaners. The Department of Social Protection subsequently removed all references to school cleaners and caretakers from the JobBridge register.

== See also ==
JobPath, successor scheme to JobBridge
