= Michael ffrench-O'Carroll =

Irish politician and medical doctor (1919–2007)

Senator
- In office 22 July 1954 – 22 May 1957
- Constituency: Cultural and Educational Panel

Teachta Dála
- In office May 1951 – May 1954
- Constituency: Dublin South-West

Personal details
- Born: 15 September 1919 Dublin, Ireland
- Died: 5 May 2007 (aged 87) Dublin, Ireland
- Party: Independent (1951–1953, 1954–1957); Fianna Fáil (1953–1954); Clann na Poblachta (1946–1951)
- Spouse: Renee Marie de la Laforcade (m. 1944)
- Education: Trinity College Dublin

Michael ffrench-O'Carroll (15 September 1919 – 5 May 2007) was an Irish politician and medical doctor. He was an independent Teachta Dála (TD) and Senator. He served one term in each house of the Oireachtas in the 1950s.

Born in Dublin, he qualified in medicine at Trinity College Dublin. He married Renee Marie de la Laforcade in 1944. He joined Clann na Poblachta at the same time as Noël Browne, though he did not stand at the 1948 general election. He became a Clann na Poblachta member of Dublin City Council in 1950.

He was elected to Dáil Éireann on his first attempt, as an independent candidate at the 1951 general election for the Dublin South-West constituency. He took the fourth seat in the 5-seat constituency, defeating Fine Gael TD Michael O'Higgins. His former party leader Seán MacBride was also elected in the same constituency. Taking his seat in the 14th Dáil, he supported the Fianna Fáil government on most issues.

In October 1953 he joined Fianna Fáil together with Noël Browne. He stood again in Dublin South-West at the 1954 general election, this time as a Fianna Fáil candidate, but lost his seat to O'Higgins. He then contested the 1954 Seanad Éireann elections as an independent candidate on the Cultural and Educational Panel, and was elected to the 8th Seanad.

At the 1957 general election, he was again an unsuccessful Fianna Fáil candidate in Dublin South-West. He was not re-elected to the Seanad.

He later became a pioneer in the field of addiction care. He established an out-patient centre at Arbour House in Cork. He also helped establish a residential programme for young adult heroin addicts at Cuan Mhuire in Athy. He published a book on addiction in 1995. He died on 5 May 2007.

Dáil	Election	Deputy (Party)	Deputy (Party)	Deputy (Party)	Deputy (Party)	Deputy (Party)
13th	1948	Seán MacBride (CnaP)	Peadar Doyle (FG)	Bernard Butler (FF)	Michael O'Higgins (FG)	Robert Briscoe (FF)
14th	1951	Seán MacBride (CnaP)	Peadar Doyle (FG)	Bernard Butler (FF)	Michael ffrench-O'Carroll (Ind.)	Robert Briscoe (FF)
15th	1954	Seán MacBride (CnaP)	Peadar Doyle (FG)	Bernard Butler (FF)	Michael O'Higgins (FG)	Robert Briscoe (FF)
15th	1956 by-election	Seán MacBride (CnaP)	Noel Lemass (FF)	Bernard Butler (FF)	Michael O'Higgins (FG)	Robert Briscoe (FF)
16th	1957	James Carroll (Ind.)	Noel Lemass (FF)	Bernard Butler (FF)	Michael O'Higgins (FG)	Robert Briscoe (FF)
16th	1959 by-election	James Carroll (Ind.)	Noel Lemass (FF)	Richie Ryan (FG)	Michael O'Higgins (FG)	Robert Briscoe (FF)
17th	1961	James Carroll (Ind.)	Noel Lemass (FF)	Richie Ryan (FG)	James O'Keeffe (FG)	Robert Briscoe (FF)
18th	1965	John O'Connell (Lab)	Noel Lemass (FF)	Richie Ryan (FG)	Joseph Dowling (FF)	Ben Briscoe (FF)
19th	1969	John O'Connell (Lab)	Noel Lemass (FF)	Seán Dunne (Lab)	Joseph Dowling (FF)	4 seats 1969–1977
19th	1970 by-election	John O'Connell (Lab)	Noel Lemass (FF)	Seán Sherwin (FF)	Joseph Dowling (FF)	4 seats 1969–1977
20th	1973	John O'Connell (Lab)	Noel Lemass (FF)	Declan Costello (FG)	Joseph Dowling (FF)	4 seats 1969–1977
20th	1976 by-election	John O'Connell (Lab)	Brendan Halligan (Lab)	Declan Costello (FG)	Joseph Dowling (FF)	4 seats 1969–1977
21st	1977	Constituency abolished. See Dublin Ballyfermot				

Dáil	Election	Deputy (Party)	Deputy (Party)	Deputy (Party)	Deputy (Party)	Deputy (Party)
22nd	1981	Seán Walsh (FF)	Larry McMahon (FG)	Mary Harney (FF)	Mervyn Taylor (Lab)	4 seats 1981–1992
23rd	1982 (Feb)	Seán Walsh (FF)	Larry McMahon (FG)	Mary Harney (FF)	Mervyn Taylor (Lab)	4 seats 1981–1992
24th	1982 (Nov)	Seán Walsh (FF)	Michael O'Leary (FG)	Mary Harney (FF)	Mervyn Taylor (Lab)	4 seats 1981–1992
25th	1987	Seán Walsh (FF)	Chris Flood (FF)	Mary Harney (PDs)	Mervyn Taylor (Lab)	4 seats 1981–1992
26th	1989	Pat Rabbitte (WP)	Chris Flood (FF)	Mary Harney (PDs)	Mervyn Taylor (Lab)	4 seats 1981–1992
27th	1992	Pat Rabbitte (DL)	Chris Flood (FF)	Mary Harney (PDs)	Mervyn Taylor (Lab)	Éamonn Walsh (Lab)
28th	1997	Pat Rabbitte (DL)	Chris Flood (FF)	Mary Harney (PDs)	Conor Lenihan (FF)	Brian Hayes (FG)
29th	2002	Pat Rabbitte (Lab)	Charlie O'Connor (FF)	Seán Crowe (SF)	Conor Lenihan (FF)	4 seats 2002–2016
30th	2007	Pat Rabbitte (Lab)	Charlie O'Connor (FF)	Brian Hayes (FG)	Conor Lenihan (FF)	4 seats 2002–2016
31st	2011	Pat Rabbitte (Lab)	Eamonn Maloney (Lab)	Brian Hayes (FG)	Seán Crowe (SF)	4 seats 2002–2016
31st	2014 by-election	Pat Rabbitte (Lab)	Eamonn Maloney (Lab)	Paul Murphy (AAA)	Seán Crowe (SF)	4 seats 2002–2016
32nd	2016	Colm Brophy (FG)	John Lahart (FF)	Paul Murphy (AAA–PBP)	Seán Crowe (SF)	Katherine Zappone (Ind.)
33rd	2020	Colm Brophy (FG)	John Lahart (FF)	Paul Murphy (S–PBP)	Seán Crowe (SF)	Francis Noel Duffy (GP)
34th	2024	Colm Brophy (FG)	John Lahart (FF)	Paul Murphy (PBP–S)	Seán Crowe (SF)	Ciarán Ahern (Lab)
