= Dublin Ballyfermot =

Dáil constituency (1977–1981)

- Former Dáil constituency

Former constituency
- Created: 1977
- Abolished: 1981
- Seats: 3
- Local government area: Dublin city
- Created from: Dublin South-West

Dublin Ballyfermot was a parliamentary constituency represented in Dáil Éireann, the lower house of the Irish parliament or Oireachtas from 1977 to 1981. The constituency elected 3 deputies (Teachtaí Dála, commonly known as TDs) to the Dáil, using proportional representation by means of the single transferable vote (PR-STV).

== History ==
The constituency was created in 1977, under the Electoral (Amendment) Act 1974, taking in parts of the former Dublin South West constituency, as part of the redistribution of constituencies which attempted to secure the re-election of the outgoing Fine Gael–Labour Party government. The constituency was abolished in 1981 with most of it becoming part of the new constituency of Dublin West.

== Boundaries ==
It covered Ballyfermot, together with most of the Crumlin and Kilmainham areas of Dublin city. It consisted of the following wards of the county borough of Dublin: Ballyfermot A, Ballyfermot B, Ballyfermot C, Ballyfermot D, Ballyfermot E, Ballyfermot F, Ballyfermot G, Crumlin A, Crumlin B, Crumlin C, Crumlin E, Kilmainham A, Kilmainham C.

== TDs ==
Teachtaí Dála (TDs) for Dublin Ballyfermot 1977–1981
Key to parties: FF = Fianna Fáil; FG = Fine Gael; Lab = Labour
Dáil	Election	Deputy (Party)	Deputy (Party)	Deputy (Party)
21st	1977	John O'Connell (Lab)	Eileen Lemass (FF)	Jim Mitchell (FG)
22nd	1981	Constituency abolished		

Note: The columns in this table are used only for presentational purposes, and no significance should be attached to the order of columns. For details of the order in which seats were won at each election, see the detailed results of that election.

== 1977 general election ==
*: Outgoing TD

1977 general election: Dublin Ballyfermot
Party	Candidate	FPv%	Count							
Party	Candidate	FPv%	1	2	3	4	5	6	7	8
Labour	John O'Connell	32.7	8,308							
Fianna Fáil	Eileen Lemass	16.7	4,253	4,405	4,416	4,452	4,484	4,786	4,927	5,983
Fine Gael	Jim Mitchell	16.6	4,223	5,350	5,362	5,428	6,146	6,672		
Fianna Fáil	Joseph Dowling	13.4	3,414	3,532	3,535	3,551	3,593	3,755	3,828	5,758
Fianna Fáil	Lauri Corcoran	10.9	2,778	2,884	2,887	2,902	2,987	3,180	3,276	
Sinn Féin The Workers' Party	Tomás Mac Giolla	5.4	1,385	1,515	1,545	1,758	1,806			
Fine Gael	Bill Brady	2.7	689	937	946	959				
Communist	John Montgomery	1.3	317	366	383					
Independent	James McKenna	0.3	78	94						
Electorate: 37,427 Valid: 25,445 Quota: 6,362 Turnout: 68.0%

== See also ==
- Dáil constituencies
- Politics of the Republic of Ireland
- Historic Dáil constituencies
- Elections in the Republic of Ireland
