= John Lahart =

Irish politician

John Lahart TD
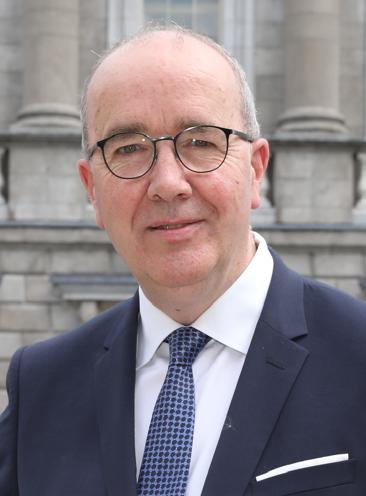
- Lahart in 2025

Teachta Dála
- Incumbent
- Assumed office February 2016
- Constituency: Dublin South-West

Personal details
- Born: Dublin, Ireland
- Party: Fianna Fáil
- Education: Mater Dei Institute of Education

John Lahart is an Irish Fianna Fáil politician who has been a Teachta Dála (TD) for the Dublin South-West constituency since the 2016 general election.

== Early life ==
Lahart is from Ballyroan, County Dublin where he was educated at Scoil an Spiorad Naomhin and then by the Christian Brothers at Coláiste Éanna. After training as a teacher at the Mater Dei Institute of Education, he taught at Ballinteer Community School from 1995 to 2000. Lahart also received a master's degree from Mater Dei in 1996. In 2007, he was awarded a BSc in Counselling and Psychotherapy.

He later lived in Knocklyon, working as a psychotherapist in private practice. He was a member of the Irish Association of Counsellors and Psychotherapists (IACP).

== Political career ==
Lahart joined Fianna Fáil in 1983, after being encouraged by Séamus Brennan TD to get involved in the party. From 1992 to 1994 and from 2000 to 2007, Lahart was a special adviser to Tom Kitt, the Fianna Fáil TD for Dublin South. He was a member of South Dublin County Council from 1999 to 2016, and served as leader of the Fianna Fáil group on the council.

In October 2014, Lahart was the unsuccessful Fianna Fáil candidate in the Dublin South-West by-election, winning only 8.6% of the first-preference votes (FPV). He was seen as having fought a good campaign, and performed well in two televised debates. Lahart described the challenge of getting known in the constituency, and in 2015 Fianna Fáil leader Micheál Martin explained the by-election as part of a medium term plan of building a "platform" for the 2016 general election.

At the 2016 general election, Lahart topped the poll with 14.3% of the FPV. He was the first candidate to be elected, on the 11th count, becoming Dublin South-West's first Fianna Fáil TD since the defeat of both Charlie O'Connor and Conor Lenihan at the 2011 general election.

In May 2016, he was appointed to the Fianna Fáil Front Bench by the leader of the Opposition Micheál Martin as opposition spokesperson for Dublin, replacing Darragh O'Brien.

At the 2020 general election, he won 8.1% of the first-preference votes, and was re-elected on the eleventh count, without reaching the quota. In June 2020, Fianna Fáil, Fine Gael and the Green Party negotiated a deal to form a coalition government, and Lahart was tipped as a possible Minister of State. However, he opposed the programme for government, and when the new government was formed, he was not one of the eight Fianna Fáil TDs to be appointed as Minister of State.

In July 2020, during the COVID-19 pandemic, he became the first TD to wear a face mask in the Dáil chamber. Lahart was a member of the cross-party Oireachtas Friends of Israel group in the Oireachtas, before resigning from the group in 2024.

Following the 2023 Electoral Commission review, there were boundary adjustments ahead of the 2024 general election, with parts of the constituency transferred elsewhere to rebalance populations in adherence with the Constitution of Ireland.

At the 2024 general election, Lahart was re-elected to the Dáil. He was subsequently appointed Cathaoirleach of the Committee on Foreign Affairs and Trade. In this role, Deputy Lahart chaired the cross-party Joint Committee that recommended the inclusion of both goods and services in the Occupied Territories Bill.

Dáil	Election	Deputy (Party)	Deputy (Party)	Deputy (Party)	Deputy (Party)	Deputy (Party)
13th	1948	Seán MacBride (CnaP)	Peadar Doyle (FG)	Bernard Butler (FF)	Michael O'Higgins (FG)	Robert Briscoe (FF)
14th	1951	Seán MacBride (CnaP)	Peadar Doyle (FG)	Bernard Butler (FF)	Michael ffrench-O'Carroll (Ind.)	Robert Briscoe (FF)
15th	1954	Seán MacBride (CnaP)	Peadar Doyle (FG)	Bernard Butler (FF)	Michael O'Higgins (FG)	Robert Briscoe (FF)
15th	1956 by-election	Seán MacBride (CnaP)	Noel Lemass (FF)	Bernard Butler (FF)	Michael O'Higgins (FG)	Robert Briscoe (FF)
16th	1957	James Carroll (Ind.)	Noel Lemass (FF)	Bernard Butler (FF)	Michael O'Higgins (FG)	Robert Briscoe (FF)
16th	1959 by-election	James Carroll (Ind.)	Noel Lemass (FF)	Richie Ryan (FG)	Michael O'Higgins (FG)	Robert Briscoe (FF)
17th	1961	James Carroll (Ind.)	Noel Lemass (FF)	Richie Ryan (FG)	James O'Keeffe (FG)	Robert Briscoe (FF)
18th	1965	John O'Connell (Lab)	Noel Lemass (FF)	Richie Ryan (FG)	Joseph Dowling (FF)	Ben Briscoe (FF)
19th	1969	John O'Connell (Lab)	Noel Lemass (FF)	Seán Dunne (Lab)	Joseph Dowling (FF)	4 seats 1969–1977
19th	1970 by-election	John O'Connell (Lab)	Noel Lemass (FF)	Seán Sherwin (FF)	Joseph Dowling (FF)	4 seats 1969–1977
20th	1973	John O'Connell (Lab)	Noel Lemass (FF)	Declan Costello (FG)	Joseph Dowling (FF)	4 seats 1969–1977
20th	1976 by-election	John O'Connell (Lab)	Brendan Halligan (Lab)	Declan Costello (FG)	Joseph Dowling (FF)	4 seats 1969–1977
21st	1977	Constituency abolished. See Dublin Ballyfermot				

Dáil	Election	Deputy (Party)	Deputy (Party)	Deputy (Party)	Deputy (Party)	Deputy (Party)
22nd	1981	Seán Walsh (FF)	Larry McMahon (FG)	Mary Harney (FF)	Mervyn Taylor (Lab)	4 seats 1981–1992
23rd	1982 (Feb)	Seán Walsh (FF)	Larry McMahon (FG)	Mary Harney (FF)	Mervyn Taylor (Lab)	4 seats 1981–1992
24th	1982 (Nov)	Seán Walsh (FF)	Michael O'Leary (FG)	Mary Harney (FF)	Mervyn Taylor (Lab)	4 seats 1981–1992
25th	1987	Seán Walsh (FF)	Chris Flood (FF)	Mary Harney (PDs)	Mervyn Taylor (Lab)	4 seats 1981–1992
26th	1989	Pat Rabbitte (WP)	Chris Flood (FF)	Mary Harney (PDs)	Mervyn Taylor (Lab)	4 seats 1981–1992
27th	1992	Pat Rabbitte (DL)	Chris Flood (FF)	Mary Harney (PDs)	Mervyn Taylor (Lab)	Éamonn Walsh (Lab)
28th	1997	Pat Rabbitte (DL)	Chris Flood (FF)	Mary Harney (PDs)	Conor Lenihan (FF)	Brian Hayes (FG)
29th	2002	Pat Rabbitte (Lab)	Charlie O'Connor (FF)	Seán Crowe (SF)	Conor Lenihan (FF)	4 seats 2002–2016
30th	2007	Pat Rabbitte (Lab)	Charlie O'Connor (FF)	Brian Hayes (FG)	Conor Lenihan (FF)	4 seats 2002–2016
31st	2011	Pat Rabbitte (Lab)	Eamonn Maloney (Lab)	Brian Hayes (FG)	Seán Crowe (SF)	4 seats 2002–2016
31st	2014 by-election	Pat Rabbitte (Lab)	Eamonn Maloney (Lab)	Paul Murphy (AAA)	Seán Crowe (SF)	4 seats 2002–2016
32nd	2016	Colm Brophy (FG)	John Lahart (FF)	Paul Murphy (AAA–PBP)	Seán Crowe (SF)	Katherine Zappone (Ind.)
33rd	2020	Colm Brophy (FG)	John Lahart (FF)	Paul Murphy (S–PBP)	Seán Crowe (SF)	Francis Noel Duffy (GP)
34th	2024	Colm Brophy (FG)	John Lahart (FF)	Paul Murphy (PBP–S)	Seán Crowe (SF)	Ciarán Ahern (Lab)
