= Dublin South-West =

Dáil constituency (1948–1977, 1981–present)

- Dáil constituency
- Location of Dublin South-West within County Dublin
- Interactive map of constituency boundaries since the 2024 general election
- Major settlements: Ballyboden; Firhouse; Rathfarnham; Tallaght; Templeogue

Current constituency
- Created: 1981
- Seats: 4 (1981–1992); 5 (1992–2002); 4 (2002–2016); 5 (2016–)
- TDs: Ciarán Ahern (Lab); Colm Brophy (FG); Seán Crowe (SF); John Lahart (FF); Paul Murphy (PBP–S)
- Local government area: South Dublin (from 1994); County Dublin (to 1994)
- Created from: Dublin County West; Dublin County Mid
- EP constituency: Dublin

Dublin South-West
- Former Dáil constituency

Former constituency
- Created: 1948
- Abolished: 1977
- Seats: 5 (1948–1969); 4 (1969–1977)
- Local government area: Dublin City
- Created from: Dublin South
- Replaced by: Dublin Ballyfermot

Dublin South-West is a parliamentary constituency represented in Dáil Éireann, the lower house of the Irish parliament or Oireachtas. The constituency elects five deputies (Teachtaí Dála, commonly known as TDs) on the system of proportional representation by means of the single transferable vote (PR-STV).

== Constituency profile ==
The constituency leans towards left-wing parties such as the Labour Party and Sinn Féin. Both Labour Party TDs elected in 2011 had been members of other left-wing parties: Pat Rabbitte of the Workers' Party and Democratic Left, and Eamonn Maloney was a member of the Jim Kemmy's Democratic Socialist Party. With the departure of Brian Hayes in 2014, upon the election of Paul Murphy of the Anti-Austerity Alliance in the 2014 by-election, the constituency was entirely represented by four left-of-centre TDs until the 2016 election.

The constituency is noted for its volatility: in three consecutive general elections, the poll topper from the previous election lost his seat, Brian Hayes in 2002, Seán Crowe in 2007 and Conor Lenihan in 2011.

== History and boundaries ==
The first constituency of this name was created by the Electoral (Amendment) Act 1947. It was based in Dublin city and existed from 1948 to 1977.

Changes to the Dublin South-West constituency 1948–1977
Years	TDs	Boundaries	Notes
1948–1961	5	The Crumlin, Kilmainham, Kimmage and Terenure Wards, the portion of the Rathfarnham Ward which is not included in the borough constituency of Dublin South-East and the portion of the Rathmines West Ward which is not included in the borough constituency of Dublin South-East.	Created from Dublin South
1961–1969	5	The Crumlin, Crumlin West, Kimmage, Rathmines West and Terenure wards and the part of the Ballyfermot ward lying to the south-east of a line drawn along the main Dublin to Cork railway.	Transfer of Kilmainhan to Dublin South-Central; transfer of part of Rathfarnham to Dublin South-East; transfer of remainder of Rathmines West from Dublin South-East.
1969–1977	4	The Ballyfermot, Crumlin and Kilmainham Wards; that part of Crumlin West ward situated within a line drawn as follows: commencing at the junction of Windmill Road with St. Mary's Road, thence commencing in a north-easterly direction and proceeding along the ward boundary to the starting point; and that part of Merchants Quay ward lying south of a line drawn as follows: commencing at the intersection of South Circular Road by the ward boundary, thence in a south-easterly direction along South Circular Road to its junction with Dolphin Avenue, thence in a southerly direction along Dolphin Avenue and its imaginary southerly projection to its intersection by the ward boundary.	Transfer of balance of Ballyfermot from Dublin County; transfer of part of Crumlin West, Rathmines West and Terenure to Dublin South-Central; transfer of Kilmainham and part of Merchants Quay from Dublin South-Central.
1977	—	Constituency abolished	Transfer of parts of Ballyfermot, Crumlin and Kilmainham to Dublin Ballyfermot; transfer of part of Merchants Quay and Kilmainham to Dublin South-Central; transfer of part of Ballyfermot and Crumlin to Dublin County West.

A second constituency of this name was created by the Electoral (Amendment) Act 1980, and has been in use since the 1981 general election. It was in a different area to the 1948–1977 constituency, being based in County Dublin (South Dublin, after the division of County Dublin in 1994), in the areas of Clondalkin, Newcastle, Rathcoole, Saggart, Tallaght, Templeogue, and parts of Terenure. At the 2002 election, it was reduced in size and electorate, losing territory — including Newcastle, Rathcoole, Saggart and Clondalkin — to the new Dublin Mid-West constituency. At the 2016 general election, it gained a seat to become a five-seat constituency, with the addition of part of the former Dublin South constituency, around Rathfarnham. Major areas today include Rathfarnham, Tallaght, and Templeogue, with the surrounding suburbs of Ballyboden, Ballyroan, Butterfield, Firhouse, Greenhills, Knocklyon, Willbrook, and parts of Terenure.

The Electoral (Amendment) Act 2023 defines the constituency as:

In the county of South Dublin, the electoral divisions of:

Ballinascorney, Ballyboden, Bohernabreena, Clondalkin-Ballymount, Edmondstown, Firhouse-Ballycullen, Firhouse-Knocklyon, Firhouse Village, Rathfarnham-Ballyroan, Rathfarnham-Butterfield, Rathfarnham-Hermitage, Rathfarnham-St. Enda's, Rathfarnham Village, Tallaght-Avonbeg, Tallaght-Belgard, Tallaght-Glenview, Tallaght-Jobstown, Tallaght-Killinardan, Tallaght-Kilnamanagh, Tallaght-Kiltipper, Tallaght-Kingswood, Tallaght-Millbrook, Tallaght-Oldbawn, Tallaght-Springfield, Tallaght-Tymon, Templeogue-Cypress, Templeogue-Kimmage Manor, Templeogue-Limekiln, Templeogue-Orwell, Templeogue-Osprey, Templeogue-Village, Terenure-Cherryfield, Terenure-Greentrees, Terenure-St. James.

Changes to the Dublin South-West constituency 1981–present
Years	TDs	Boundaries	Notes
1981–1987	4	In County Dublin, the DEDs of Clondalkin Number One, Clondalkin Number Two, Newcastle, Rathcoole, Saggart, Tallaght Number Two, Tallaght Number Three, Terenure Number Three, Terenure Number Four; and that part of the district electoral division of Tallaght Number One situated north of the centre of the River Dodder.	New constituency, created by the transfer of Clondalkin Number One, Clondalkin Number Two, Newcastle, Rathcoole and Saggart from Dublin County West; and of Tallaght Number Two, Tallaght Number Three, Terenure Number Three, Terenure Number Four, and part of Tallaght Number One from Dublin County Mid.
1987–1992	4	In County Dublin, the DEDs of Clondalkin Number One, Clondalkin Number Two, Newcastle, Rathcoole, Saggart, Tallaght Number Two, Tallaght Number Three, Terenure Number Four; and that part of the district electoral division of Tallaght Number One situated north of the centre of the River Dodder.	Transfer of Terenure No. 3 to Dublin South-Central.
1992–2002	5	In County Dublin, the DEDs of Ballinascorney, Clondalkin-Ballymount, Clondalkin-Dunawley, Clondalkin-Monastery, Clondalkin Village, Newcastle, Rathcoole, Saggart, Tallaght-Avonbeg, Tallaght-Belgard, Tallaght-Fettercairn, Tallaght-Glenview, Tallaght-Jobstown, Tallaght-Killinardan, Tallaght-Kilnamanagh, Tallaght-Kiltipper, Tallaght-Kingswood, Tallaght-Millbrook, Tallaght-Oldbawn, Tallaght-Springfield, Tallaght-Tymon, Templeogue-Limekiln, Templeogue-Osprey, Terenure St. James; and that part of the district electoral division of Templeogue-Cypress situated south of a line drawn along the Tallaght Road; and, in the district electoral division of Bohernabreena, the townlands of: Allagour, Ballymorefinn, Bohernabreena, Castlekelly, Corrageen, Cunard, Friarstown Lower, Friarstown Upper, Glassamucky, Glassamucky Brakes, Glassamucky Mountain, Glassavullaun, Kiltipper, Mountpelier, Orlagh, Piperstown; and those parts of the townlands of Killininny, Oldbawn and Oldcourt situated within the said district electoral division.	Increase in district magnitude with no change in area. New definitions of DEDs.
2002–2007	4	In South Dublin, the EDs of Ballinascorney, Bohernabreena, Tallaght-Avonbeg, Tallaght-Belgard, Tallaght-Fettercairn, Tallaght-Glenview, Tallaght-Jobstown, Tallaght-Killinardan, Tallaght-Kiltipper, Tallaght-Kingswood, Tallaght-Millbrook, Tallaght-Oldbawn, Tallaght-Springfield, Tallaght-Tymon, Templeogue-Cypress, Templeogue-Limekiln, Templeogue-Orwell, Templeogue-Osprey, Templeogue Village, Terenure-St. James; and those parts of the electoral divisions of Clondalkin-Ballymount and Tallaght-Kilnamanagh situated west of a line drawn along the M50 Western Parkway; and that part of the electoral division of Firhouse Village which is not comprised in the constituency of Dublin South.	Transfer of Firhouse and Bohernabreena from Dublin South, transfer of the Saggart and Rathcoole areas to Dublin Mid-West. Population swop with Dublin South-Central to secure an eastern boundary bounded largely by the M50, Greenhills Road and Templeville Road.
2007–2016	4	In South Dublin, the EDs of Ballinascorney, Bohernabreena, Firhouse Village, Tallaght-Avonbeg, Tallaght-Belgard, Tallaght-Fettercairn, Tallaght-Glenview, Tallaght-Jobstown, Tallaght-Killinardan, Tallaght-Kiltipper, Tallaght-Kingswood, Tallaght-Millbrook, Tallaght-Oldbawn, Tallaght-Springfield, Tallaght-Tymon, Templeogue-Cypress, Templeogue-Limekiln, Templeogue-Orwell, Templeogue-Osprey, Templeogue Village, Terenure-St. James; and those parts of the electoral divisions of Clondalkin-Ballymount and Tallaght-Kilnamanagh situated west of a line drawn along the M50 Western Parkway.	Transfer from Dublin South of remainder of Firhouse Village.
2016–2024	5	In South Dublin, the EDs of Ballinascorney, Ballyboden, Bohernabreena, Edmondstown, Firhouse-Ballycullen, Firhouse-Knocklyon, Firhouse Village, Rathfarnham-Ballyroan, Rathfarnham-Butterfield, Rathfarnham-Hermitage, Rathfarnham-St. Enda’s, Rathfarnham Village, Tallaght-Avonbeg, Tallaght-Belgard, Tallaght-Fettercairn, Tallaght-Glenview, Tallaght-Jobstown, Tallaght-Killinardan, Tallaght-Kiltipper, Tallaght-Kingswood, Tallaght-Millbrook, Tallaght-Oldbawn, Tallaght-Springfield, Tallaght-Tymon, Templeogue-Cypress, Templeogue-Limekiln, Templeogue-Orwell, Templeogue-Osprey, Templeogue Village, Terenure-St. James; and those parts of the electoral divisions of Clondalkin-Ballymount and Tallaght-Kilnamanagh situated west of a line drawn along the M50 Western Parkway.	Transfer from former Dublin South of Ballyboden, Edmondstown, Firhouse-Ballycullen, Firhouse-Knocklyon, Rathfarnham-Ballyroan, Rathfarnham-Butterfield, Rathfarnham-Hermitage, Rathfarnham-St. Endas and Rathfarnham-Village.
2024–2024	5	In South Dublin, the EDs of Ballinascorney, Ballyboden, Bohernabreena, Clondalkin-Ballymount, Edmondstown, Firhouse-Ballycullen, Firhouse-Knocklyon, Firhouse Village, Rathfarnham-Ballyroan, Rathfarnham-Butterfield, Rathfarnham-Hermitage, Rathfarnham-St. Enda's, Rathfarnham Village, Tallaght-Avonbeg, Tallaght-Belgard, Tallaght-Glenview, Tallaght-Jobstown, Tallaght-Killinardan, Tallaght-Kilnamanagh, Tallaght-Kiltipper, Tallaght-Kingswood, Tallaght-Millbrook, Tallaght-Oldbawn, Tallaght-Springfield, Tallaght-Tymon, Templeogue-Cypress, Templeogue-Kimmage Manor, Templeogue-Limekiln, Templeogue-Orwell, Templeogue-Osprey, Templeogue-Village, Terenure-Cherryfield, Terenure-Greentrees, Terenure-St. James.	Transfer from Dublin South-Central of Templeogue-Kimmage Manor, Terenure-Greentrees, Terenure-Cherryfield, Clondalkin-Ballymount (part north of M50), Tallaght-Kilnamanagh (part north of M50) and the transfer of Tallaght-Fettercairn to Dublin Mid-West

== TDs ==
=== TDs 1948–1977 ===
Teachtaí Dála (TDs) for Dublin South-West 1948–1977
Key to parties: CnaP = Clann na Poblachta; FF = Fianna Fáil; FG = Fine Gael; Ind. = Independent; Lab = Labour
Dáil	Election	Deputy (Party)	Deputy (Party)	Deputy (Party)	Deputy (Party)	Deputy (Party)
13th	1948	Seán MacBride (CnaP)	Peadar Doyle (FG)	Bernard Butler (FF)	Michael O'Higgins (FG)	Robert Briscoe (FF)
14th	1951	Seán MacBride (CnaP)	Peadar Doyle (FG)	Bernard Butler (FF)	Michael ffrench-O'Carroll (Ind.)	Robert Briscoe (FF)
15th	1954	Seán MacBride (CnaP)	Peadar Doyle (FG)	Bernard Butler (FF)	Michael O'Higgins (FG)	Robert Briscoe (FF)
15th	1956 by-election	Seán MacBride (CnaP)	Noel Lemass (FF)	Bernard Butler (FF)	Michael O'Higgins (FG)	Robert Briscoe (FF)
16th	1957	James Carroll (Ind.)	Noel Lemass (FF)	Bernard Butler (FF)	Michael O'Higgins (FG)	Robert Briscoe (FF)
16th	1959 by-election	James Carroll (Ind.)	Noel Lemass (FF)	Richie Ryan (FG)	Michael O'Higgins (FG)	Robert Briscoe (FF)
17th	1961	James Carroll (Ind.)	Noel Lemass (FF)	Richie Ryan (FG)	James O'Keeffe (FG)	Robert Briscoe (FF)
18th	1965	John O'Connell (Lab)	Noel Lemass (FF)	Richie Ryan (FG)	Joseph Dowling (FF)	Ben Briscoe (FF)
19th	1969	John O'Connell (Lab)	Noel Lemass (FF)	Seán Dunne (Lab)	Joseph Dowling (FF)	4 seats 1969–1977
19th	1970 by-election	John O'Connell (Lab)	Noel Lemass (FF)	Seán Sherwin (FF)	Joseph Dowling (FF)	4 seats 1969–1977
20th	1973	John O'Connell (Lab)	Noel Lemass (FF)	Declan Costello (FG)	Joseph Dowling (FF)	4 seats 1969–1977
20th	1976 by-election	John O'Connell (Lab)	Brendan Halligan (Lab)	Declan Costello (FG)	Joseph Dowling (FF)	4 seats 1969–1977
21st	1977	Constituency abolished. See Dublin Ballyfermot				

Note: The columns in this table are used only for presentational purposes, and no significance should be attached to the order of columns. For details of the order in which seats were won at each election, see the detailed results of that election.

=== TDs since 1981 ===
Note that the boundaries of Dublin South-West from 1981 onwards share no common territory with the pre-1977 boundaries. See §History and boundaries

Teachtaí Dála (TDs) for Dublin South-West 1981–
Key to parties: AAA = Anti-Austerity Alliance; AAA–PBP = AAA–PBP; DL = Democratic Left; FF = Fianna Fáil; FG = Fine Gael; GP = Green; Ind. = Independent; Lab = Labour; PBP–S = PBP–Solidarity; PDs = Progressive Democrats; SF = Sinn Féin; S–PBP = Solidarity–PBP; WP = Workers' Party
Dáil	Election	Deputy (Party)	Deputy (Party)	Deputy (Party)	Deputy (Party)	Deputy (Party)
22nd	1981	Seán Walsh (FF)	Larry McMahon (FG)	Mary Harney (FF)	Mervyn Taylor (Lab)	4 seats 1981–1992
23rd	1982 (Feb)	Seán Walsh (FF)	Larry McMahon (FG)	Mary Harney (FF)	Mervyn Taylor (Lab)	4 seats 1981–1992
24th	1982 (Nov)	Seán Walsh (FF)	Michael O'Leary (FG)	Mary Harney (FF)	Mervyn Taylor (Lab)	4 seats 1981–1992
25th	1987	Seán Walsh (FF)	Chris Flood (FF)	Mary Harney (PDs)	Mervyn Taylor (Lab)	4 seats 1981–1992
26th	1989	Pat Rabbitte (WP)	Chris Flood (FF)	Mary Harney (PDs)	Mervyn Taylor (Lab)	4 seats 1981–1992
27th	1992	Pat Rabbitte (DL)	Chris Flood (FF)	Mary Harney (PDs)	Mervyn Taylor (Lab)	Éamonn Walsh (Lab)
28th	1997	Pat Rabbitte (DL)	Chris Flood (FF)	Mary Harney (PDs)	Conor Lenihan (FF)	Brian Hayes (FG)
29th	2002	Pat Rabbitte (Lab)	Charlie O'Connor (FF)	Seán Crowe (SF)	Conor Lenihan (FF)	4 seats 2002–2016
30th	2007	Pat Rabbitte (Lab)	Charlie O'Connor (FF)	Brian Hayes (FG)	Conor Lenihan (FF)	4 seats 2002–2016
31st	2011	Pat Rabbitte (Lab)	Eamonn Maloney (Lab)	Brian Hayes (FG)	Seán Crowe (SF)	4 seats 2002–2016
31st	2014 by-election	Pat Rabbitte (Lab)	Eamonn Maloney (Lab)	Paul Murphy (AAA)	Seán Crowe (SF)	4 seats 2002–2016
32nd	2016	Colm Brophy (FG)	John Lahart (FF)	Paul Murphy (AAA–PBP)	Seán Crowe (SF)	Katherine Zappone (Ind.)
33rd	2020	Colm Brophy (FG)	John Lahart (FF)	Paul Murphy (S–PBP)	Seán Crowe (SF)	Francis Noel Duffy (GP)
34th	2024	Colm Brophy (FG)	John Lahart (FF)	Paul Murphy (PBP–S)	Seán Crowe (SF)	Ciarán Ahern (Lab)

Note: The columns in this table are used only for presentational purposes, and no significance should be attached to the order of columns. For details of the order in which seats were won at each election, see the detailed results of that election.

== Elections ==
*: Outgoing TD

=== 2024 general election ===
2024 general election: Dublin South-West
Party	Candidate	FPv%	Count										
Party	Candidate	FPv%	1	2	3	4	5	6	7	8	9	10	11
Sinn Féin	Seán Crowe	14.8	9,869	9,939	9,991	10,509	10,934	11,226					
Fine Gael	Colm Brophy	12.7	8,498	8,517	8,734	8,751	8,871	9,043	12,498				
Fianna Fáil	John Lahart	12.4	8,263	8,293	8,471	8,512	8,788	8,970	9,259	9,672	9,798	13,814	
Labour	Ciarán Ahern	8.7	5,788	5,808	6,445	6,485	6,633	8,222	8,526	8,778	9,213	9,938	11,349
PBP–Solidarity	Paul Murphy (Note: Murphy is a member of People Before Profit.)	7.6	5,081	5,136	5,233	5,577	5,760	6,612	6,666	6,708	9,019	9,532	9,928
Fianna Fáil	Teresa Costello	7.1	4,747	4,777	4,859	4,994	5,251	5,405	5,860	6,406	6,695		
Fine Gael	Sarah Barnes	6.4	4,286	4,302	4,458	4,472	4,592	4,767					
Sinn Féin	Niamh Whelan	6.0	4,031	4,081	4,103	4,398	4,785	5,144	5,173	5,192			
Social Democrats	Ross O'Mullane	5.9	3,928	3,962	4,248	4,305	4,508						
Independent	Alan Edge	5.5	3,649	3,799	3,944	4,564	5,304	5,888	5,996	6,084	6,928	7,563	8,148
Aontú	Saoirse Ní Chónaráin	3.9	2,599	3,122	3,148	3,748							
Independent	Paddy Holohan	3.7	2,457	3,019	3,034								
Green	Francis Noel Duffy	2.9	1,931	1,944									
National Party	Yan Mac Oireachtaigh	2.2	1,450										
Independent	Niall Hade	0.2	129										
Independent	Colm O'Keeffe	0.2	117										
Electorate: 114,832 Valid: 66,823 Spoilt: 558 Quota: 11,138 Turnout: 58.7%

=== 2020 general election ===
2020 general election: Dublin South-West
Party	Candidate	FPv%	Count										
Party	Candidate	FPv%	1	2	3	4	5	6	7	8	9	10	11
Sinn Féin	Seán Crowe	29.7	20,077										
Fine Gael	Colm Brophy	12.2	8,269	8,382	8,464	8,543	10,642	10,908	10,934	11,131	11,143	11,543	
Fianna Fáil	John Lahart	8.1	5,503	5,656	5,756	5,817	5,901	7,331	7,366	7,498	7,518	10,100	10,974
Green	Francis Noel Duffy	7.3	4,961	5,551	5,701	5,914	6,111	6,354	6,516	7,598	7,955	8,393	11,138
Solidarity–PBP	Paul Murphy (Note: Murphy was a member of RISE.)	6.6	4,477	7,921	8,058	8,495	8,523	8,622	11,028	12,311			
Independent	Katherine Zappone	5.5	3,708	4,141	4,198	4,441	4,800	5,142	5,298	5,864	6,142	6,730	8,050
Labour	Ciarán Ahern	5.3	3,603	3,905	4,003	4,129	4,286	4,482	4,564	5,256	5,447	5,803	
Fianna Fáil	Charlie O'Connor	5.0	3,376	3,642	3,846	4,063	4,123	4,904	4,985	5,128	5,166		
Fianna Fáil	Deirdre O'Donovan	4.9	3,314	3,407	3,489	3,523	3,639						
Fine Gael	Ellen O'Malley Dunlop	4.6	3,111	3,144	3,172	3,197							
Social Democrats	Carly Bailey	4.1	2,761	3,598	3,727	3,970	4,020	4,136	4,555				
Solidarity–PBP	Sandra Fay (Note: Fay was a member of Solidarity.)	2.4	1,653	3,224	3,321	3,627	3,641	3,696					
Independent	Mick Duff	1.9	1,268	1,990	2,210								
Renua	Ann Marie Condren	1.3	886	985									
National Party	Philip Dwyer	0.8	508	617									
Independent	Colm O'Keeffe	0.1	90	141									
Electorate: 109,517 Valid: 67,565 Spoilt: 629 (0.9%) Quota: 11,261 Turnout: 68,194 (62.3%)

=== 2016 general election ===
2016 general election: Dublin South-West
Party	Candidate	FPv%	Count															
Party	Candidate	FPv%	1	2	3	4	5	6	7	8	9	10	11	12	13	14	15	16
Fianna Fáil	John Lahart	14.3	9,647	9,655	9,678	9,725	9,772	9,892	10,045	10,160	10,506	10,565	11,402					
AAA–PBP	Paul Murphy	13.4	9,005	9,020	9,047	9,194	9,247	9,316	9,626	9,758	10,054	10,366	10,678	13,528				
Fine Gael	Colm Brophy	10.7	7,195	7,202	7,213	7,235	7,576	7,660	7,758	8,028	8,193	8,213	8,655	8,695	8,724	8,764	10,126	10,639
Sinn Féin	Seán Crowe	10.4	6,974	6,978	6,983	7,054	7,070	7,098	7,230	7,362	7,413	9,502	9,642	9,959	11,068	11,082	11,245	
Fine Gael	Anne-Marie Dermody	9.6	6,463	6,467	6,477	6,496	6,779	6,889	6,948	7,087	7,316	7,337	7,793	7,835	7,868	7,911	9,079	9,503
Independent	Katherine Zappone	6.6	4,463	4,486	4,515	4,604	4,660	4,913	5,131	5,262	5,731	5,797	6,129	6,294	6,724	6,753	7,542	9,655
AAA–PBP	Sandra Fay	4.8	3,241	3,244	3,249	3,312	3,324	3,374	3,439	3,492	3,593	3,725	3,832					
Independent	Peter Fitzpatrick	4.6	2,812	2,829	2,866	3,064	3,094	3,210	3,353	3,433	3,742	3,799	4,163	4,332	4,632	4,677	4,916	
Renua	Ronan McMahon	4.3	2,906	2,912	2,952	3,003	3,026	3,100	3,208	3,258	3,518	3,548						
Labour	Pamela Kearns	3.9	2,635	2,640	2,646	2,658	2,700	2,883	2,936	3,796	3,902	3,933	4,099	4,116	4,163	4,182		
Sinn Féin	Sarah Holland	3.9	2,616	2,621	2,630	2,667	2,685	2,721	2,764	2,792	2,884							
Independent	Deirdre O'Donovan	3.3	2,197	2,220	2,261	2,308	2,326	2,411	2,534	2,571								
Labour	Mick Duff	2.6	1,743	1,743	1,749	1,776	1,871	1,947	2,120									
Independent	Eamonn Maloney	2.4	1,627	1,628	1,638	1,671	1,722	1,748										
Green	Francis Noel Duffy	1.9	1,297	1,303	1,307	1,332	1,337											
Fine Gael	Karen Warren	1.6	1,088	1,090	1,096	1,105												
Independent	Declan Burke	0.8	515	525	561													
Direct Democracy	Stephen Sinclair	0.5	359	375	385													
Independent	Kieran Quigley	0.5	317	329														
Independent	Joan Summerville Molloy	0.2	112															
Independent	Frank O'Gorman	0.1	59															
Electorate: 105,420 Valid: 67,271 Spoilt: 647 (1.0%) Quota: 11,212 Turnout: 67,918 (64.4%)

=== 2014 by-election ===
Brian Hayes was elected for Dublin at the 2014 European Parliament election on 23 May 2014, vacating his Dáil seat. The by-election was held on 10 October 2014.

2014 by-election: Dublin South-West
Party	Candidate	FPv%	Count							
Party	Candidate	FPv%	1	2	3	4	5	6	7	8
Sinn Féin	Cathal King	30.3	7,288	7,304	7,340	7,448	7,580	7,828	8,017	8,999
Anti-Austerity Alliance	Paul Murphy	27.2	6,540	6,579	6,622	6,890	7,079	7,436	7,726	9,565
Independent	Ronan McMahon	8.9	2,142	2,167	2,227	2,265	2,464	3,049	3,416	
Fine Gael	Cáit Keane	8.8	2,110	2,117	2,194	2,203	2,267	2,575	3,857	
Fianna Fáil	John Lahart	8.6	2,077	2,085	2,138	2,152	2,200			
Labour	Pamela Kearns	8.5	2,043	2,053	2,155	2,170	2,239	2,492		
Independent	Declan Burke	2.8	681	711	746	818				
People Before Profit	Nicky Coules	2.2	530	540	554					
Green	Francis Noel Duffy	1.9	447	453						
Independent	Tony Rochford	0.4	92							
Independent	Colm O'Keeffe	0.3	74							
Electorate: 70,400 Valid: 24,024 Spoilt: 256 (1.1%) Quota: 12,013 Turnout: 24,280 (34.5%)

=== 2011 general election ===
2011 general election: Dublin South-West
Party	Candidate	FPv%	Count							
Party	Candidate	FPv%	1	2	3	4	5	6	7	8
Labour	Pat Rabbitte	27.4	12,867							
Fine Gael	Brian Hayes	19.9	9,366	9,880						
Sinn Féin	Seán Crowe	17.2	8,064	8,429	8,515	8,772	8911	10,189		
Labour	Eamonn Maloney	8.9	4,165	6,208	6,363	6,703	6,869	7,783	8,326	9,657
Fine Gael	Cáit Keane	7.8	3,678	3,823	3,945	4,155	4,715	4,902	5,051	6,133
Fianna Fáil	Charlie O'Connor	5.8	2,718	2,833	2,864	2,948	4,363	4,523	4,600	
Socialist Party	Mick Murphy (Note: Murphy campaigned as a member of the United Left Alliance.)	5.2	2,462	2,624	2,662	2,920	2,975			
Fianna Fáil	Conor Lenihan	5.0	2,341	2,393	2,414	2,488				
Independent	Ray Kelly	1.8	823	870	883					
Green	Francis Noel Duffy	1.0	480	511	521					
Electorate: 70,613 Valid: 46,964 Spoilt: 511 (1.1%) Quota: 9,393 Turnout: 47,475 (67.2%)

=== 2007 general election ===
2007 general election: Dublin South-West
Party	Candidate	FPv%	Count					
Party	Candidate	FPv%	1	2	3	4	5	6
Fianna Fáil	Conor Lenihan	20.5	8,542					
Fine Gael	Brian Hayes	20.0	8,346					
Labour	Pat Rabbitte	20.0	8,325	8,342				
Fianna Fáil	Charlie O'Connor	18.8	7,813	7,985	8,102	8,106	8,109	8,439
Sinn Féin	Seán Crowe	12.2	5,066	5,076	5,183	5,185	5,189	5,766
Socialist Party	Mick Murphy	3.8	1,580	1,584	1,659	1,661	1,661	
Green	Elizabeth Davidson	3.7	1,546	1,552	1,655	1,662	1,666	2,234
Fathers Rights	Ray Kelly	1.0	434	436				
Electorate: 67,148 Valid: 41,652 Spoilt: 370 (0.9%) Quota: 8,331 Turnout: 42,022 (62.6%)

=== 2002 general election ===
2002 general election: Dublin South-West
Party	Candidate	FPv%	Count					
Party	Candidate	FPv%	1	2	3	4	5	6
Sinn Féin	Seán Crowe	20.3	7,466					
Fianna Fáil	Charlie O'Connor	19.4	7,155	7,189	7,342	7,361		
Fianna Fáil	Conor Lenihan	19.2	7,080	7,116	7,232	7,250	7,361	
Labour	Pat Rabbitte	17.2	6,314	6,364	6,499	6,523	7,190	7,648
Fine Gael	Brian Hayes	12.7	4,654	4,681	4,803	4,815	4,910	5,084
Green	Patrick Quinn	3.1	1,157	1,214	1,334	1,348	1,408	1,687
Labour	Éamonn Walsh	2.6	971	984	1,004	1,008		
Socialist Party	Mick Murphy	2.6	954	994	1,055	1,069	1,104	
Christian Solidarity	Darragh O'Reilly	2.1	760	779				
Independent	Ray Kelly	0.8	291					
Electorate: 67,947 Valid: 36,802 Spoilt: 414 (1.1%) Quota: 7,361 Turnout: 37,216 (54.8%)

=== 1997 general election ===
1997 general election: Dublin South-West
Party	Candidate	FPv%	Count						
Party	Candidate	FPv%	1	2	3	4	5	6	7
Fine Gael	Brian Hayes	15.5	6,487	6,585	6,623	6,822	7,048		
Fianna Fáil	Chris Flood	12.4	5,195	5,274	5,305	5,399	5,550	6,474	7,346
Democratic Left	Pat Rabbitte	12.2	5,094	5,183	5,222	5,445	5,903	6,161	7,037
Progressive Democrats	Mary Harney	11.3	4,713	4,789	5,472	5,671	5,791	6,392	6,687
Fianna Fáil	Conor Lenihan	10.6	4,436	4,491	4,528	4,609	4,744	5,830	6,485
Labour	Éamonn Walsh	9.7	4,070	4,131	4,153	4,340	4,702	4,825	5,460
Sinn Féin	Seán Crowe	8.9	3,725	3,838	3,846	3,996	4,440	4,556	
Fianna Fáil	Colm McGrath	6.9	2,898	2,925	3,053	3,109	3,219		
Socialist Party	Mick Murphy	4.8	2,026	2,100	2,110	2,249			
Green	Monique Mary Federsel	3.1	1,315	1,452	1,468				
Progressive Democrats	Colm Tyndall	2.4	995	1,023					
Independent	Marie Kinsella	1.2	509						
Independent	Dermot Mara	0.6	242						
Independent	Harry Richards	0.2	76						
Independent	Denis Dowling	0.2	71						
Electorate: 75,646 Valid: 41,852 Spoilt: 440 (1.0%) Quota: 6,976 Turnout: 42,292 (55.9%)

=== 1992 general election ===
1992 general election: Dublin South-West
Party	Candidate	FPv%	Count												
Party	Candidate	FPv%	1	2	3	4	5	6	7	8	9	10	11	12	13
Labour	Mervyn Taylor	25.5	10,871												
Fianna Fáil	Chris Flood	15.5	6,596	6,748	6,759	6,776	6,783	6,866	6,996	7,098	7,856				
Progressive Democrats	Mary Harney	11.6	4,964	5,210	5,213	5,229	5,240	5,318	5,344	5,503	5,656	5,714	5,949	6,267	7,835
Democratic Left	Pat Rabbitte	8.8	3,743	4,226	4,238	4,255	4,332	4,405	4,511	4,697	4,813	4,854	5,334	5,557	6,249
Labour	Éamonn Walsh	8.4	3,594	5,963	5,978	5,995	6,083	6,173	6,301	6,529	6,646	6,671	7,167		
Fine Gael	Michael Keating	6.1	2,614	2,728	2,734	2,741	2,746	2,784	2,797	2,858	2,930	2,934	3,083	3,209	
Fianna Fáil	Colm McGrath	5.4	2,288	2,312	2,323	2,327	2,328	2,336	2,373	2,399	2,634	2,775	2,886	4,376	4,603
Fianna Fáil	John Hannon	4.3	1,832	1,867	1,874	1,879	1,882	1,906	1,948	1,968	2,200	2,594	2,792		
Fianna Fáil	Charles O'Connor	4.0	1,701	1,780	1,783	1,790	1,797	1,831	1,856	1,884					
Independent	Peter Keogh	3.5	1,511	1,619	1,638	1,662	1,686	1,803	1,911	2,090	2,179	2,192			
Green	David Cotter	2.0	871	920	930	938	968	1,044	1,202						
Sinn Féin	Seán Crowe	2.0	846	864	871	877	896	916							
Independent	Bob Byrne	1.4	581	626	641	708	722								
Workers' Party	Esther Kelly	0.7	293	315	323	326									
Independent	Anthony John Hubbard	0.4	184	196	204										
Independent	Harry Richards	0.4	159	165											
Electorate: 69,922 Valid: 42,648 Spoilt: 709 (1.6%) Quota: 7,109 Turnout: 43,357 (62.0%)

=== 1989 general election ===
1989 general election: Dublin South-West
Party	Candidate	FPv%	Count						
Party	Candidate	FPv%	1	2	3	4	5	6	7
Labour	Mervyn Taylor	22.4	8,734						
Fianna Fáil	Chris Flood	18.8	7,346	7,424	7,427	7,556	7,584	7,861	
Workers' Party	Pat Rabbitte	18.4	7,166	7,539	7,568	7,908			
Fianna Fáil	Seán Walsh	14.7	5,737	5,917	5,921	6,037	6,054	6,224	6,598
Progressive Democrats	Mary Harney	11.1	4,323	4,449	4,460	4,496	4,738	5,214	7,565
Fine Gael	Larry McMahon	5.9	2,297	2,373	2,375	2,393	3,110	3,337	
Green	Conor Delaney	3.2	1,259	1,305	1,324	1,591	1,641		
Fine Gael	Clare Leonard	2.7	1,049	1,071	1,072	1,084			
Sinn Féin	Seán Crowe	2.6	1,018	1,042	1,050				
Independent	Alan Plummer	0.2	84	90					
Electorate: 64,995 Valid: 39,013 Spoilt: 513 (1.3%) Quota: 7,803 Turnout: 39,526 (60.8%)

=== 1987 general election ===
1987 general election: Dublin South-West
Party	Candidate	FPv%	Count												
Party	Candidate	FPv%	1	2	3	4	5	6	7	8	9	10	11	12	13
Progressive Democrats	Mary Harney	19.7	8,169	8,172	8,178	8,199	8,236	8,252	8,272	8,428					
Fianna Fáil	Chris Flood	19.5	8,082	8,088	8,092	8,127	8,145	8,179	8,241	8,255	8,263	8,490			
Fianna Fáil	Seán Walsh	19.1	7,922	7,926	7,931	7,946	7,949	7,955	8,004	8,015	8,025	8,192	8,220	8,358	
Workers' Party	Pat Rabbitte	12.3	5,086	5,095	5,100	5,140	5,207	5,230	5,271	5,296	5,311	5,695	5,781	5,800	6,408
Labour	Mervyn Taylor	11.1	4,607	4,615	4,621	4,643	4,686	4,697	4,988	5,036	5,064	5,216	5,357	5,376	7,942
Fine Gael	Larry McMahon	8.2	3,407	3,411	3,412	3,419	3,427	3,431	3,442	3,661	3,692	3,712	4,814	4,819	
Fine Gael	Breda Cass	2.9	1,187	1,188	1,192	1,196	1,207	1,210	1,211	1,392	1,436	1,449			
Sinn Féin	John Noonan	2.4	1,001	1,002	1,002	1,006	1,025	1,312	1,314	1,319	1,320				
Fine Gael	Therese Ridge	1.6	656	656	658	660	664	664	666						
Labour	Éamonn Walsh	1.1	458	462	465	470	481	484							
Sinn Féin	Christopher Dunne	0.9	378	380	391	397	400								
Democratic Socialist	Eamonn Maloney	0.5	223	225	229	239									
Independent	Gerry Jago	0.3	143	155	177										
Independent	Barbara Hyland	0.2	71	73											
Independent	Diarmuid O'Flanagan	0.2	64												
Electorate: 59,955 Valid: 41,454 Quota: 8,291 Turnout: 69.1%

=== November 1982 general election ===
November 1982 general election: Dublin South-West
Party	Candidate	FPv%	Count								
Party	Candidate	FPv%	1	2	3	4	5	6	7	8	9
Labour	Mervyn Taylor	20.8	7,814								
Fianna Fáil	Seán Walsh	17.2	6,465	6,472	6,527	6,585	6,608	7,831			
Fine Gael	Michael O'Leary	15.1	5,682	5,690	5,725	5,800	5,860	5,888	5,893	6,337	7,420
Fianna Fáil	Mary Harney	12.3	4,619	4,629	4,656	4,744	4,768	6,099	6,367	7,080	7,430
Fine Gael	Larry McMahon	10.6	3,991	4,008	4,041	4,088	4,135	4,168	4,176	4,555	6,443
Fine Gael	Conal Brennan	7.8	2,929	2,935	2,976	3,038	3,081	3,136	3,138	3,544	
Fianna Fáil	Richard Conroy	7.1	2,673	2,674	2,694	2,733	2,741				
Workers' Party	Pat Rabbitte	6.3	2,365	2,389	2,521	2,721	2,798	2,850	2,866		
Independent	Nan Joyce	1.5	581	597	648						
Independent	Richard O'Reilly	0.8	297	446							
Independent	Noel Murphy	0.6	240								
Electorate: 54,745 Valid: 37,656 Quota: 7,532 Turnout: 68.8%

=== February 1982 general election ===
February 1982 general election: Dublin South-West
Party	Candidate	FPv%	Count				
Party	Candidate	FPv%	1	2	3	4	5
Fianna Fáil	Seán Walsh	20.8	7,407				
Labour	Mervyn Taylor	19.8	7,063	7,081	7,387		
Fianna Fáil	Mary Harney	16.3	5,830	5,973	6,135	9,408	
Fine Gael	Larry McMahon	15.9	5,688	5,700	6,880	7,007	7,626
Fine Gael	George Laing	10.8	3,848	3,852	4,508	4,617	5,183
Fianna Fáil	Richard Conroy	9.8	3,508	3,596	3,629		
Fine Gael	Con McCarthy	6.6	2,354	2,356			
Electorate: 50,836 Valid: 35,698 Quota: 7,140 Turnout: 70.2%

=== 1981 general election ===
1981 general election: Dublin South-West
Party	Candidate	FPv%	Count						
Party	Candidate	FPv%	1	2	3	4	5	6	7
Fianna Fáil	Seán Walsh	20.2	7,311						
Fine Gael	Larry McMahon	17.3	6,266	6,302	6,421	7,121	8,751		
Labour	Mervyn Taylor	15.3	5,522	6,197	6,517	6,737	7,188	7,514	
Fianna Fáil	Mary Harney	11.6	4,192	4,222	4,626	4,783	4,861	4,879	7,822
Fine Gael	Conal Brennan	8.2	2,946	2,990	3,107	3,813	4,567	5,712	5,863
Fianna Fáil	Richard Conroy	8.1	2,916	2,931	3,171	3,224	3,276	3,304	
Fine Gael	George Laing	6.7	2,444	2,470	2,522	3,002			
Fine Gael	John Garvey	5.9	2,154	2,207	2,289				
Independent	Kevin Boland	4.2	1,519	1,535					
Labour	Brendan Byrne	2.5	897						
Electorate: 51,182 Valid: 36,167 Spoilt: 389 (1.1%) Quota: 7,234 Turnout: 36,556 (71.4%)

=== 1976 by-election ===
Fianna Fáil TD Noel Lemass died on 13 April 1976. A by-election was held to fill the vacancy on 10 June 1976.

1976 by-election: Dublin South-West
Party	Candidate	FPv%	Count					
Party	Candidate	FPv%	1	2	3	4	5	6
Fianna Fáil	Eileen Lemass	38.8	9,687	9,694	9,722	10,108	10,578	11,462
Labour	Brendan Halligan	27.5	6,870	6,886	6,924	7,175	7,855	12,099
Fine Gael	Jim Mitchell	20.7	5,169	5,174	5,196	5,345	5,612	
Official Sinn Féin	Tomás Mac Giolla	6.7	1,679	1,702	1,815	2,158		
Aontacht Éireann	Kevin Boland	4.8	1,186	1,199	1,292			
Irish Republican Socialist	Íte Ní Chionnaith	1.2	287	332				
Marxist–Leninist	Bláthnaid Ní Chinnéide	0.5	113					
Electorate: 46,585 Valid: 24,991 Quota: 12,496 Turnout: 53.7%

=== 1973 general election ===
1973 general election: Dublin South-West
Party	Candidate	FPv%	Count						
Party	Candidate	FPv%	1	2	3	4	5	6	7
Labour	John O'Connell	32.7	9,865						
Fianna Fáil	Noel Lemass	15.6	4,705	4,817	4,832	4,859	4,898	5,094	5,667
Fine Gael	Declan Costello	15.4	4,633	5,284	5,358	5,463	6,508		
Fianna Fáil	Joseph Dowling	13.1	3,939	4,062	4,079	4,108	4,167	4,340	6,387
Fianna Fáil	Thomas Dalton	8.6	2,603	2,645	2,652	2,668	2,689	2,827	
Aontacht Éireann	Seán Sherwin	4.4	1,340	1,539	1,585	1,958	2,047		
Fine Gael	Jim Mitchell	4.0	1,194	1,419	1,453	1,522			
Sinn Féin	James Spooner	3.2	972	1,066	1,097				
Labour	Patrick O'Mahony	1.8	541	2,463	3,064	3,422	3,621	4,377	4,409
Labour	Pat Sweeney	1.2	369	833					
Electorate: 41,740 Valid: 30,161 Quota: 6,033 Turnout: 72.3%

=== 1970 by-election ===
Labour Party TD Seán Dunne died on 25 June 1969, before the first sitting of the 19th Dáil on 2 July. A by-election was held on 4 March 1970.

1970 by-election: Dublin South-West
Party	Candidate	FPv%	Count			
Party	Candidate	FPv%	1	2	3	4
Fianna Fáil	Seán Sherwin	33.0	7,678	7,897	8,641	10,710
Labour	Matt Merrigan	21.5	5,004	5,963	7,336	10,448
Independent	Lauri Corcoran	19.2	4,481	4,891	6,690	
Fine Gael	Jim Mitchell	17.4	4,062	4,415		
Independent	Cora Dunne	8.9	2,062			
Electorate: 40,690 Valid: 23,287 Quota: 11,644 Turnout: 57.2%

=== 1969 general election ===
1969 general election: Dublin South-West
Party	Candidate	FPv%	Count											
Party	Candidate	FPv%	1	2	3	4	5	6	7	8	9	10	11	12
Fianna Fáil	Joseph Dowling	19.6	5,724	5,728	5,740	5,762	5,777	6,428						
Labour	John O'Connell	18.1	5,273	5,306	5,344	5,513	5,544	5,605	5,615	6,050				
Labour	Seán Dunne	17.6	5,136	5,158	5,181	5,649	5,669	5,798	5,821	6,886				
Fianna Fáil	Noel Lemass	8.6	2,512	2,518	2,529	2,542	2,545	3,256	3,776	3,819	3,847	3,862	3,935	4,707
Independent	Lauri Corcoran	7.1	2,066	2,094	2,118	2,147	2,192	2,230	2,252	2,438	2,633	2,723	2,919	
Labour	George Butler	5.6	1,643	1,653	1,663	1,799	1,810	1,820	1,824					
Fianna Fáil	Seán Sherwin	5.6	1,643	1,648	1,660	1,674	1,679							
Fine Gael	James O'Keeffe	4.6	1,331	1,342	1,683	1,688	1,930	1,952	1,954	1,975	2,063	2,086		
Fine Gael	James McMahon	4.1	1,203	1,219	1,412	1,430	2,009	2,052	2,060	2,086	2,177	2,199	3,738	4,505
Labour	Liam Farrell	3.1	893	897	898									
Fine Gael	Harry Lowe	2.9	856	860	954	964								
Fine Gael	Pierce Redmond	2.6	759	764										
Independent	Ciaran McKeown	0.5	154											
Electorate: 40,690 Valid: 29,193 Quota: 5,839 Turnout: 71.7%

=== 1965 general election ===
1965 general election: Dublin South-West
Party	Candidate	FPv%	Count									
Party	Candidate	FPv%	1	2	3	4	5	6	7	8	9	10
Fianna Fáil	Noel Lemass	18.9	7,596									
Fine Gael	Richie Ryan	13.6	5,484	5,495	5,657	5,934	6,150	6,219	6,389	6,620	6,711	
Fianna Fáil	Joseph Dowling	11.5	4,607	4,892	4,894	4,903	5,068	5,691	5,743	6,092	6,183	6,307
Fianna Fáil	Ben Briscoe	11.0	4,416	4,825	4,829	4,838	4,984	5,894	5,952	6,301	6,359	6,498
Fine Gael	James O'Keeffe	10.8	4,352	4,368	4,479	4,604	4,715	4,740	4,854	5,176	5,281	5,860
Labour	John O'Connell	10.7	4,299	4,324	4,338	4,349	4,712	4,760	6,005	6,443	8,517	
Independent	James Carroll	4.5	1,796	1,822	1,829	1,837	2,006	2,075	2,131			
Labour	John O'Donovan	4.5	1,792	1,800	1,805	1,811	1,982	2,031				
Labour	Patrick Coghlan	4.4	1,762	1,768	1,773	1,776	2,015	2,034	2,331	2,593		
Fianna Fáil	Gerard Buchanan	4.2	1,699	1,787	1,788	1,792	1,832					
Independent	Joseph Christle	4.1	1,649	1,663	1,671	1,682						
Fine Gael	Patrick Turner	1.0	409	410	465							
Fine Gael	Frederick Pope	0.9	374	375								
Electorate: 56,943 Valid: 40,235 Quota: 6,706 Turnout: 70.7%

=== 1961 general election ===
1961 general election: Dublin South-West
Party	Candidate	FPv%	Count									
Party	Candidate	FPv%	1	2	3	4	5	6	7	8	9	10
Fianna Fáil	Robert Briscoe	16.6	5,574	5,595	5,612							
Fianna Fáil	Noel Lemass	14.8	4,961	4,971	4,990	4,995	5,400	5,435	5,529	5,563	5,806	
Fine Gael	Richie Ryan	13.4	4,496	4,508	4,531	4,531	4,578	5,020	5,183	5,607		
Independent	James Carroll	10.1	3,378	3,411	3,455	3,462	3,527	3,571	3,885	3,977	4,565	5,670
Fianna Fáil	Joseph Dowling	9.8	3,293	3,307	3,332	3,333	3,638	3,652	3,747	3,776	4,041	4,459
Fine Gael	James O'Keeffe	6.8	2,276	2,289	2,300	2,300	2,319	2,611	2,725	3,772	4,017	4,856
Clann na Poblachta	Seán MacBride	6.4	2,135	2,246	2,276	2,276	2,313	2,349	2,642	2,698	3,334	
Independent	Joseph Christle	5.4	1,814	1,930	1,969	1,969	1,987	2,017	2,276	2,310		
Fine Gael	Joseph Mack	4.3	1,442	1,449	1,456	1,456	1,470	1,702	1,757			
Fine Gael	Michael O'Connor	3.3	1,111	1,118	1,123	1,123	1,141					
Fianna Fáil	Cecilia Keeble	2.9	964	969	975	975						
Labour	Hilda Larkin	2.8	930	951	1,492	1,494	1,531	1,541				
Labour	Patrick Coghlan	2.2	754	775								
Sinn Féin	Séamus McGuinness	1.3	444									
Electorate: 54,819 Valid: 33,572 Quota: 5,596 Turnout: 61.2%

=== 1959 by-election ===
Fianna Fáil TD Bernard Butler died on 13 March 1959. A by-election was held to fill the vacancy on 22 July 1959.

1959 by-election: Dublin South-West
Party	Candidate	FPv%	Count			
Party	Candidate	FPv%	1	2	3	4
Fianna Fáil	Joseph Dowling	37.2	9,280	9,449	9,888	11,343
Fine Gael	Richie Ryan	26.1	6,523	6,638	7,396	11,399
Clann na Poblachta	Seán MacBride	20.6	5,138	5,709	7,035	
Labour	Hilda Larkin	10.8	2,693	2,883		
Sinn Féin	Tomás Ó Dubhghaill	5.4	1,341			
Electorate: 62,394 Valid: 24,975 Quota: 12,488 Turnout: 40.0%

=== 1957 general election ===
1957 general election: Dublin South-West
Party	Candidate	FPv%	Count										
Party	Candidate	FPv%	1	2	3	4	5	6	7	8	9	10	11
Fianna Fáil	Robert Briscoe	20.6	8,162										
Fianna Fáil	Noel Lemass	13.7	5,436	5,791	5,867	6,844							
Fine Gael	Michael O'Higgins	12.2	4,830	4,844	5,382	5,421	5,423	5,682	7,340				
Independent	James Carroll	9.8	3,878	3,960	4,102	4,182	4,191	4,753	5,001	5,274	5,726	7,180	
Clann na Poblachta	Seán MacBride	6.8	2,677	2,701	2,783	2,825	2,833	3,199	3,372	3,548	4,585	5,197	5,391
Fianna Fáil	Bernard Butler	6.4	2,543	3,337	3,369	4,129	4,337	4,470	4,536	4,584	4,916	5,625	6,008
Independent	Beatrice Dixon	6.3	2,488	2,530	2,584	2,683	2,689	3,012	3,147	3,361	3,677		
Sinn Féin	Seoirse Dearle	6.2	2,442	2,454	2,479	2,499	2,501	2,638	2,675	2,701			
Labour	John Colgan	5.2	2,045	2,060	2,102	2,128	2,130						
Fine Gael	Edmond Power	4.7	1,866	1,874	2,230	2,260	2,264	2,468					
Fianna Fáil	Michael ffrench-O'Carroll	4.7	1,853	2,060	2,095								
Fine Gael	James O'Keeffe	3.5	1,397	1,403									
Electorate: 63,286 Valid: 39,617 Quota: 6,603 Turnout: 62.6%

=== 1956 by-election ===
Fine Gael TD Peadar Doyle died on 4 August 1956. A by-election to fill the vacancy was held on 14 November 1956.

1956 by-election: Dublin South-West
Party	Candidate	FPv%	Count
Party	Candidate	FPv%	1
Fianna Fáil	Noel Lemass	59.8	14,416
Fine Gael	Edmond Power	40.2	9,682
Electorate: 63,286 Valid: 24,098 Quota: 12,050 Turnout: 38.1%

=== 1954 general election ===
1954 general election: Dublin South-West
Party	Candidate	FPv%	Count									
Party	Candidate	FPv%	1	2	3	4	5	6	7	8	9	10
Fianna Fáil	Robert Briscoe	15.1	6,594	6,604	6,619	6,634	6,662	6,687	6,688	6,980	7,127	7,178
Clann na Poblachta	Seán MacBride	14.1	6,151	6,215	6,263	6,312	6,513	6,601	6,620	7,146	8,475	
Fine Gael	Peadar Doyle	13.6	5,940	5,969	5,988	6,030	6,266	7,631				
Fianna Fáil	Bernard Butler	13.5	5,894	5,917	5,925	5,936	5,969	6,025	6,031	6,592	6,761	6,829
Fianna Fáil	Michael ffrench-O'Carroll	11.6	5,080	5,092	5,119	5,131	5,168	5,221	5,226	5,468	5,644	5,723
Fine Gael	Michael O'Higgins	11.0	4,783	4,802	4,821	4,847	4,885	5,381	5,693	5,999	6,433	6,915
Independent	James Carroll	5.2	2,262	2,290	2,303	2,333	2,388	2,466	2,474			
Fine Gael	William Croly	4.9	2,155	2,167	2,179	2,193	2,285					
Labour	John Colgan	4.4	1,924	1,938	2,002	2,146	3,427	3,496	3,500	3,794		
Labour	Richard Deasy	3.7	1,617	1,628	1,705	2,059						
Labour	Matt Merrigan	1.4	631	641	701							
Irish Workers' League	Michael O'Riordan	0.9	375	377								
Independent	Myles Heffernan (Note: Former Internee ran under the banner of Cine Gael.)	0.6	245									
Electorate: 63,545 Valid: 43,651 Quota: 7,276 Turnout: 68.7%

=== 1951 general election ===
1951 general election: Dublin South-West
Party	Candidate	FPv%	Count									
Party	Candidate	FPv%	1	2	3	4	5	6	7	8	9	10
Fianna Fáil	Robert Briscoe	20.0	8,417									
Fianna Fáil	Bernard Butler	15.6	6,529	7,606								
Independent	Michael ffrench-O'Carroll	13.9	5,842	5,876	5,894	6,036	6,107	6,210	6,943	7,120		
Fine Gael	Peadar Doyle	13.9	5,823	5,852	5,871	5,880	5,960	6,320	7,220			
Clann na Poblachta	Seán MacBride	6.8	2,853	2,864	2,872	2,887	3,201	3,295	3,862	3,941	6,098	6,288
Fine Gael	Michael O'Higgins	6.6	2,754	2,759	2,764	2,769	2,781	3,316	3,452	3,521		
Fianna Fáil	Carroll O'Daly	6.4	2,682	2,833	3,291	3,310	3,337	3,362	3,478	5,807	6,131	6,161
Fianna Fáil	Thomas Reynolds	6.1	2,572	2,649	2,716	2,729	2,752	2,794	2,857			
Labour	Richard Deasy	5.6	2,335	2,349	2,374	2,453	2,578	2,625				
Fine Gael	James O'Keeffe	2.9	1,211	1,215	1,217	1,225	1,237					
Clann na Poblachta	Richard Batterberry	1.6	684	696	698	704						
Irish Workers' Party	Michael O'Riordan	0.7	295	298	300							
Electorate: 60,934 Valid: 41,997 Quota: 7,000 Turnout: 68.9%

=== 1948 general election ===
1948 general election: Dublin South-West
Party	Candidate	FPv%	Count										
Party	Candidate	FPv%	1	2	3	4	5	6	7	8	9	10	11
Clann na Poblachta	Seán MacBride	21.8	8,648										
Fianna Fáil	Robert Briscoe	15.1	5,961	5,981	5,989	6,005	6,118	6,130	6,262	6,296	6,306	6,987	
Fianna Fáil	Bernard Butler	15.0	5,956	5,994	6,009	6,024	6,177	6,211	6,358	6,408	6,425	8,579	
Fine Gael	Peadar Doyle	12.9	5,102	5,208	5,234	5,253	5,271	5,363	5,956	7,800			
Fine Gael	Michael O'Higgins	8.2	3,243	3,296	3,307	3,316	3,330	3,378	3,484	4,396	5,530	5,685	6,151
Fine Gael	William James Croly	7.1	2,806	2,818	2,825	2,836	2,844	2,864	2,983				
Fianna Fáil	Carroll O'Daly	6.3	2,476	2,494	2,517	2,532	3,033	3,064	3,139	3,168	3,190		
Labour	Joseph Deasy	4.4	1,737	1,775	1,979	2,608	2,616	2,661					
Clann na Poblachta	Richard Batterberry	3.0	1,196	2,065	2,076	2,090	2,098	3,233	3,953	3,993	4,009	4,065	4,299
Fianna Fáil	Thomas Teevan	2.1	820	828	829	829							
Clann na Poblachta	May Laverty	1.5	605	1,438	1,471	1,490	1,496						
Labour	John Dominick Heery	1.4	564	583	760								
Labour	John Moran	1.2	490	523									
Electorate: 55,924 Valid: 39,604 Quota: 6,601 Turnout: 70.8%

== See also ==
- Elections in the Republic of Ireland
- Politics of the Republic of Ireland
- List of Dáil by-elections
- List of political parties in the Republic of Ireland
