= Cáit Keane =

Irish former politician

Senator
- In office 25 May 2011 – 8 June 2016
- Constituency: Labour Panel

South Dublin County Councillor
- In office 2004–2011
- Constituency: Terenure-Rathfarnham
- In office 1991–2004
- Constituency: Terenure

Personal details
- Born: 24 September 1949 (age 76) Galway, Ireland
- Party: Fine Gael (since 2008)
- Other political affiliations: Progressive Democrats

Cáit Keane (born 24 September 1949) is an Irish Fine Gael politician and former member of Seanad Éireann.

Keane first entered politics as a member of the Progressive Democrats (PDs), and was elected to represent Terenure on Dublin County Council at the 1991 local elections. On three occasions she contested the Dáil constituency of Dublin South-Central for the PDs: at the 1992 general election, a by-election in 1994 and the 1997 general election. She was elected to South Dublin County Council for the electoral area of Terenure-Rathfarnham in 1999 and 2004.

Following the dissolution of the Progressive Democrats, Keane joined Fine Gael in October 2008. She held her council seat for Fine Gael at the 2009 local elections.

At the 2011 general election she contested Dublin South-West, but failed to be elected. In April 2011 she was elected to Seanad Éireann on the Labour Panel.

She was the Fine Gael Seanad spokesperson on environment and local government.

She was an unsuccessful candidate at the 2014 Dublin South-West by-election.

In August 2020, she attended a golf party in County Galway which breached the COVID-19 guidelines.
