= 2014 Dublin South-West by-election =

By-election to the 31st Dáil

- 10 October 2014
- Turnout: 24,280 (34.5%)
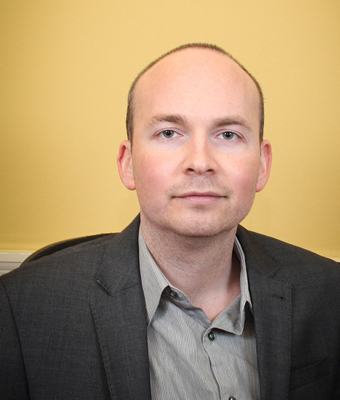

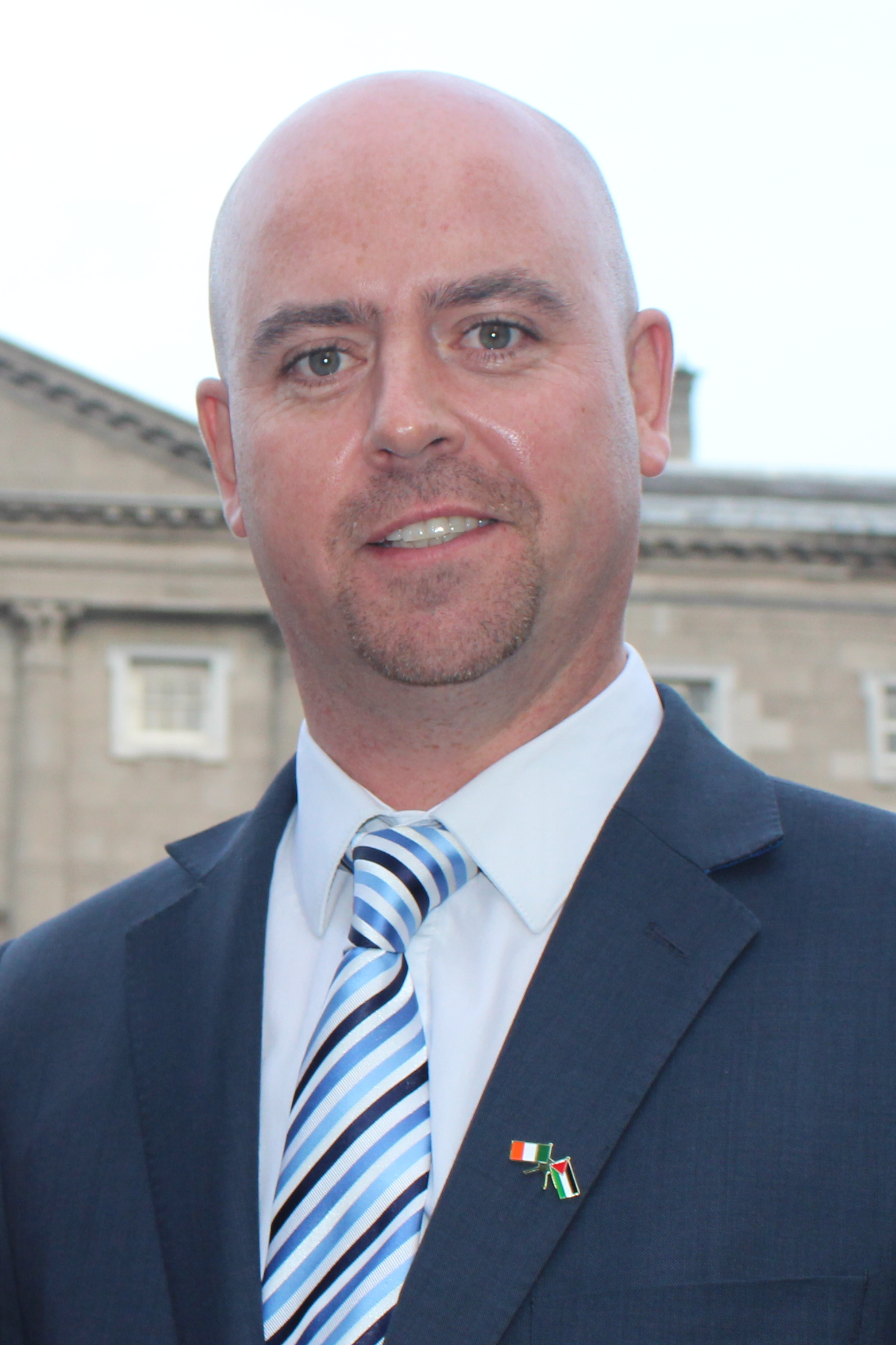
			Keane
Nominee	Paul Murphy	Cathal King	Cáit Keane
Party	Anti-Austerity Alliance	Sinn Féin	Fine Gael
First preferences	6,540	7,288	2,110
Percentage	27.2%	30.3%	8.8%
Final count	9,565	8,999	–
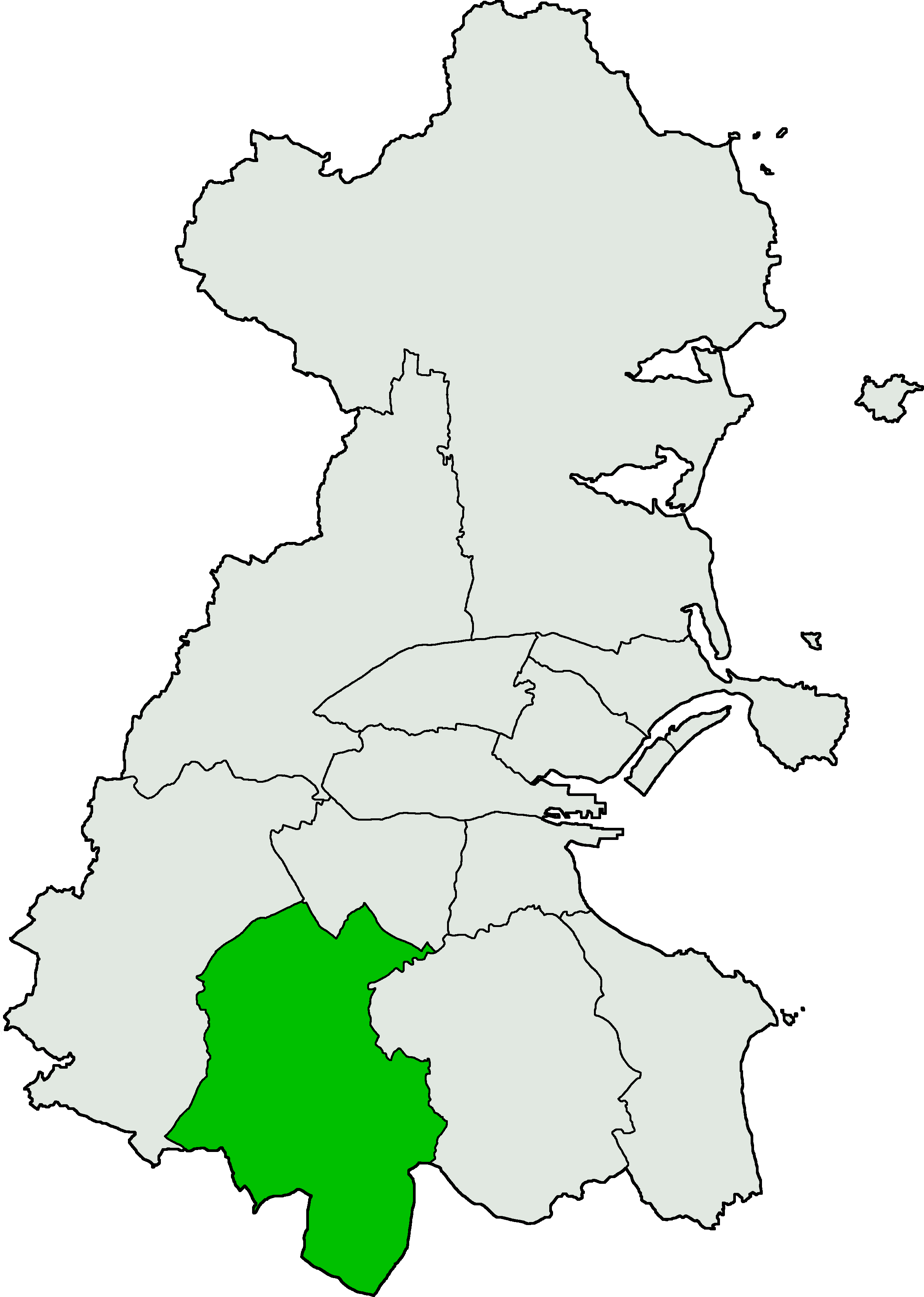
- Dublin South-West shown within County Dublin
TD before election
Brian Hayes
Fine Gael
TD after election
Paul Murphy
Anti-Austerity Alliance

A Dáil by-election was held in the constituency of Dublin South-West in Ireland on Friday, 10 October 2014, to fill a vacancy in the 31st Dáil. It followed the election of Fine Gael Teachta Dála (TD) Brian Hayes to the European Parliament.

The Electoral (Amendment) Act 2011 stipulates that a by-election in Ireland must be held within six months of a vacancy occurring. The Roscommon–South Leitrim by-election was held on the same date.

Paul Murphy of the Anti-Austerity Alliance was elected on the eighth count. Murphy's victory came as a surprise as Sinn Féin had performed extremely well in local elections the previous May, winning 50.3% of the first preference vote in the Tallaght South LEA and 32% in the Tallaght Central LEA, and were widely predicted to win the seat. Murphy largely campaigned on the issue of Irish Water, stating that Sinn Féin could not be trusted to oppose water charges. In the wake of a poor local election result, Labour and Fine Gael were not considered contenders for the seat while Fianna Fáil largely focused its resources on the Roscommon–South Leitrim by-election.

Murphy's victory brought the issue of water charges to the forefront of political debate in the run-up to the 2016 general election, and contributed to a shift in Sinn Féin's position to one of outright opposition.

== Result ==
2014 Dublin South-West by-election
Party	Candidate	FPv%	Count							
Party	Candidate	FPv%	1	2	3	4	5	6	7	8
Sinn Féin	Cathal King	30.3	7,288	7,304	7,340	7,448	7,580	7,828	8,017	8,999
Anti-Austerity Alliance	Paul Murphy	27.2	6,540	6,579	6,622	6,890	7,079	7,436	7,726	9,565
Independent	Ronan McMahon	8.9	2,142	2,167	2,227	2,265	2,464	3,049	3,416	
Fine Gael	Cáit Keane	8.8	2,110	2,117	2,194	2,203	2,267	2,575	3,857	
Fianna Fáil	John Lahart	8.6	2,077	2,085	2,138	2,152	2,200			
Labour	Pamela Kearns	8.5	2,043	2,053	2,155	2,170	2,239	2,492		
Independent	Declan Burke	2.8	681	711	746	818				
People Before Profit	Nicky Coules	2.2	530	540	554					
Green	Francis Noel Duffy	1.9	447	453						
Independent	Tony Rochford	0.4	92							
Independent	Colm O'Keeffe	0.3	74							
Electorate: 70,400 Valid: 24,024 Spoilt: 256 (1.1%) Quota: 12,013 Turnout: 24,280 (34.5%)

== See also ==
- 2014 Roscommon–South Leitrim by-election
