= Jim Mitchell (politician) =

Irish politician (1946–2002)

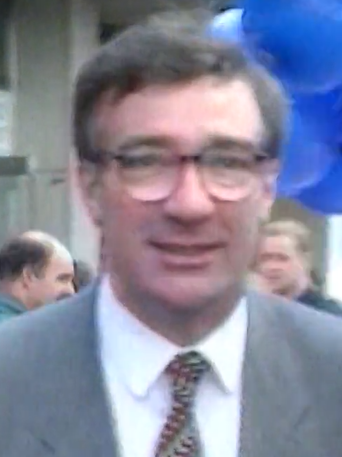
- Mitchell in 1994

Deputy leader of Fine Gael
- In office 9 February 2001 – 5 June 2002
- Leader: Michael Noonan
- Preceded by: Nora Owen
- Succeeded by: Richard Bruton

Minister for Communications
- In office 2 January 1984 – 10 March 1987
- Taoiseach: Garret FitzGerald
- Preceded by: New office
- Succeeded by: John Wilson

Minister for Transport
- In office 14 December 1982 – 2 January 1984
- Taoiseach: Garret FitzGerald
- Preceded by: John Wilson
- Succeeded by: Office abolished

Minister for Posts and Telegraphs
- In office 14 December 1982 – 2 January 1984
- Taoiseach: Garret FitzGerald
- Preceded by: John Wilson
- Succeeded by: Office abolished

Minister for Justice
- In office 30 June 1981 – 9 March 1982
- Taoiseach: Garret FitzGerald
- Preceded by: Gerry Collins
- Succeeded by: Seán Doherty

Lord Mayor of Dublin
- In office 6 June 1976 – 5 June 1977
- Preceded by: Paddy Dunne
- Succeeded by: Michael Collins

Teachta Dála
- In office November 1992 – May 2002
- Constituency: Dublin Central
- In office June 1981 – November 1992
- Constituency: Dublin West
- In office June 1977 – June 1981
- Constituency: Dublin Ballyfermot

Personal details
- Born: James Mitchell; 19 October 1946 Inchicore, Dublin, Ireland
- Died: 2 December 2002 (aged 56) Phibsborough, Dublin, Ireland
- Party: Fine Gael
- Spouse: Patricia Kenny (m. 1975)
- Children: 5
- Relatives: Gay Mitchell (brother)
- Education: Dublin Institute of Technology

Jim Mitchell (19 October 1946 – 2 December 2002) was an Irish Fine Gael politician who served as deputy leader of Fine Gael from 2001 to 2002, Minister for Communications from 1984 to 1987, Minister for Transport and Minister for Posts and Telegraphs from 1982 to 1984, Minister for Justice from 1981 to 1982 and Lord Mayor of Dublin from 1976 to 1977. He served as a Teachta Dála (TD) from 1977 to 2002.

== Early life ==
He was born in Inchicore, Dublin, the seventh child among five sons and five daughters of Peter Mitchell, a machinist, and Eileen Mitchell (née Whelan). He was educated at James's St. CBS, Inchicore vocational school, and the College of Commerce, Rathmines. At age 14 he entered the Guinness Brewery as a shop-floor worker. While working he completed his Leaving Certificate, and did computer studies at night at Trinity College Dublin. After qualifying as a computer analyst, he joined the Guinness computer staff in the early 1970s.

Mitchell began his political involvement when he joined Fine Gael in 1967, becoming that party's unsuccessful candidate in a by-election in 1970. He was an unsuccessful candidate for Dáil Éireann at the 1973 general election in Dublin South-West and lost again in the 1976 by-election in the same constituency, to Labour Party's Brendan Halligan. Mitchell was elected to Dublin Corporation in 1974. In 1976, aged 29, he became the youngest ever Lord Mayor of Dublin.

== Political career ==
At the 1977 general election he was elected to Dáil Éireann as a Fine Gael TD for the Dublin Ballyfermot constituency. With the party's loss of power in 1977, the new leader, Garret FitzGerald appointed Mitchell to the Party's Front Bench as Spokesperson for Labour. At the 1981 general election, Mitchell was elected for the Dublin West constituency as Fine Gael dramatically increased its number of seats before forming a coalition government with the Labour Party. On his appointment as Taoiseach, Garret FitzGerald caused some surprise by excluding some of the older conservative former ministers from his cabinet. Instead young liberals were appointed, with Mitchell receiving the post of Minister for Justice. The Fine Gael–Labour government collapsed in January 1982, but regained power in December of that year. Mitchell again was included in the FitzGerald cabinet, as Minister for Posts and Telegraphs and Minister for Transport. These positions were combined into the position of Minister of Communications in January 1984.

Mitchell granted the aviation licence to the fledgling airline Ryanair on 29 November 1985. This was granted despite strong opposition by Ireland's national carrier Aer Lingus, and from Fianna Fáil and other left-wing parties. The issue of the licence broke Aer Lingus' stranglehold on flights to London from the Republic of Ireland.

Mitchell, who was seen as being on the liberal wing of Fine Gael and was, however, out of favour with John Bruton when he became Fine Gael leader in 1990. When Bruton formed the Rainbow Coalition in December 1994, Mitchell was not appointed to any cabinet post.

Mitchell contested and won Dáil elections in 1977, 1981, February 1982, November 1982, 1987, 1989, 1992 and 1997. He also ran unsuccessfully for the European Parliament in the 1994 and 1999 elections. He also was director of elections for Austin Currie, the Fine Gael candidate, in the 1990 presidential election. In 2001, Bruton was deposed as Fine Gael leader, and replaced by Michael Noonan. Mitchell served as his deputy from 2001 to 2002.

== Chairman of the Public Accounts Committee ==
Mitchell also chaired the Oireachtas Public Accounts Committee. Under Mitchell's chairmanship, the committee began to look at allegations of corruption and wide-scale tax evasion in the banking sector, particularly regarding Deposit interest retention tax (DIRT). It was established that there was a culture of encouraging tax evasion within Irish banks, which had allowed wealthy customers to set up non-resident (off-shore, international) bank accounts into which money was transferred, enabling the account holder to avoid paying DIRT. The scandal resulted Allied Irish Banks being forced to reach a settlement of €90 million with the Revenue Commissioners in respect of DIRT evasion in 2000 in addition to thousands of tax-evaders being prosecuted including the former Minister for Justice Pádraig Flynn. The Mitchell inquiry was "shocked and horrified" at the "careless and reckless" manner in which the Governor of the Central Bank of Ireland had quoted false statistics to the Public Accounts subcommittee. Mitchell received much praise for his role in exposing the scandal.

== Loss of seat and death ==
Though regarded in politics as one of Fine Gael's "survivors", who held onto his seat amid major boundary changes, constituency changes and by attracting working class votes in a party whose appeal was primarily middle class, Mitchell lost his Dublin Central seat at the 2002 general election. That election witnessed a large-scale collapse in the Fine Gael vote, with the party dropping from 54 to 31 seats in Dáil Éireann. Although Mitchell suffered from the swing against Fine Gael in Dublin, he was not aided by the fact that Inchicore, which was considered his base in the constituency had been moved to Dublin South-Central. Jim had chosen not to run in that constituency as his brother Gay was a sitting TD running for re-election for that constituency.

Mitchell had earlier had a liver transplant in an attempt to beat a rare form of cancer which had cost the lives of a number of his siblings. Though the operation was successful, the cancer returned, and Mitchell ultimately died of the disease in December 2002.

His former constituency colleague and rival, Bertie Ahern, described Jim Mitchell as having made an "outstanding contribution to Irish politics."

== See also ==
- Families in the Oireachtas

Civic offices
Preceded by Paddy Dunne	Lord Mayor of Dublin; 1976–1977	Succeeded by Michael Collins
Political offices
Preceded by Gerry Collins	Minister for Justice; 1981–1982	Succeeded by Seán Doherty
Preceded by John Wilson	Minister for Transport; 1982–1984	Succeeded by Himself as Minister for Communications
Preceded by John Wilson	Minister for Posts and Telegraphs; 1982–1984	Succeeded by Himself as Minister for Communications
Preceded by Himself as Minister for Posts and Telegraphs and Minister for Transport	Minister for Communications; 1984–1987	Succeeded by John Wilson
Party political offices
Preceded by Nora Owen	Deputy leader of Fine Gael; 2001–2002	Succeeded by Richard Bruton

Dáil	Election	Deputy (Party)	Deputy (Party)	Deputy (Party)
21st	1977	John O'Connell (Lab)	Eileen Lemass (FF)	Jim Mitchell (FG)
22nd	1981	Constituency abolished		

Dáil	Election	Deputy (Party)	Deputy (Party)	Deputy (Party)	Deputy (Party)	Deputy (Party)
22nd	1981	Jim Mitchell (FG)	Brian Lenihan Snr (FF)	Richard Burke (FG)	Eileen Lemass (FF)	Brian Fleming (FG)
23rd	1982 (Feb)	Jim Mitchell (FG)	Brian Lenihan Snr (FF)	Richard Burke (FG)	Liam Lawlor (FF)	Brian Fleming (FG)
23rd	1982 by-election	Jim Mitchell (FG)	Brian Lenihan Snr (FF)	Liam Skelly (FG)	Liam Lawlor (FF)	Brian Fleming (FG)
24th	1982 (Nov)	Jim Mitchell (FG)	Brian Lenihan Snr (FF)	Liam Skelly (FG)	Eileen Lemass (FF)	Tomás Mac Giolla (WP)
25th	1987	Jim Mitchell (FG)	Brian Lenihan Snr (FF)	Pat O'Malley (PDs)	Liam Lawlor (FF)	Tomás Mac Giolla (WP)
26th	1989	Jim Mitchell (FG)	Brian Lenihan Snr (FF)	Austin Currie (FG)	Liam Lawlor (FF)	Tomás Mac Giolla (WP)
27th	1992	Joan Burton (Lab)	Brian Lenihan Snr (FF)	Austin Currie (FG)	Liam Lawlor (FF)	4 seats 1992–2002
27th	1996 by-election	Joan Burton (Lab)	Brian Lenihan Jnr (FF)	Austin Currie (FG)	Liam Lawlor (FF)	4 seats 1992–2002
28th	1997	Joe Higgins (SP)	Brian Lenihan Jnr (FF)	Austin Currie (FG)	Liam Lawlor (FF)	4 seats 1992–2002
29th	2002	Joe Higgins (SP)	Brian Lenihan Jnr (FF)	Joan Burton (Lab)	3 seats 2002–2011	
30th	2007	Leo Varadkar (FG)	Brian Lenihan Jnr (FF)	Joan Burton (Lab)	3 seats 2002–2011	
31st	2011	Leo Varadkar (FG)	Brian Lenihan Jnr (FF)	Joan Burton (Lab)	Joe Higgins (SP)	4 seats 2011–2024
31st	2011 by-election	Leo Varadkar (FG)	Patrick Nulty (Lab)	Joan Burton (Lab)	Joe Higgins (SP)	4 seats 2011–2024
31st	2014 by-election	Leo Varadkar (FG)	Ruth Coppinger (SP)	Joan Burton (Lab)	Joe Higgins (SP)	4 seats 2011–2024
32nd	2016	Leo Varadkar (FG)	Ruth Coppinger (AAA–PBP)	Joan Burton (Lab)	Jack Chambers (FF)	4 seats 2011–2024
33rd	2020	Leo Varadkar (FG)	Paul Donnelly (SF)	Roderic O'Gorman (GP)	Jack Chambers (FF)	4 seats 2011–2024
34th	2024	Emer Currie (FG)	Paul Donnelly (SF)	Roderic O'Gorman (GP)	Jack Chambers (FF)	Ruth Coppinger (PBP–S)

Dáil	Election	Deputy (Party)	Deputy (Party)	Deputy (Party)	Deputy (Party)
19th	1969	Frank Cluskey (Lab)	Vivion de Valera (FF)	Thomas J. Fitzpatrick (FF)	Maurice E. Dockrell (FG)
20th	1973	Frank Cluskey (Lab)	Vivion de Valera (FF)	Thomas J. Fitzpatrick (FF)	Maurice E. Dockrell (FG)
21st	1977	Constituency abolished			

Dáil	Election	Deputy (Party)	Deputy (Party)	Deputy (Party)	Deputy (Party)	Deputy (Party)
22nd	1981	Bertie Ahern (FF)	Michael Keating (FG)	Alice Glenn (FG)	Michael O'Leary (Lab)	George Colley (FF)
23rd	1982 (Feb)	Bertie Ahern (FF)	Michael Keating (FG)	Tony Gregory (Ind.)	Michael O'Leary (Lab)	George Colley (FF)
24th	1982 (Nov)	Bertie Ahern (FF)	Michael Keating (FG)	Tony Gregory (Ind.)	Alice Glenn (FG)	George Colley (FF)
24th	1983 by-election	Bertie Ahern (FF)	Michael Keating (FG)	Tony Gregory (Ind.)	Alice Glenn (FG)	Tom Leonard (FF)
25th	1987	Bertie Ahern (FF)	Michael Keating (PDs)	Tony Gregory (Ind.)	Dermot Fitzpatrick (FF)	John Stafford (FF)
26th	1989	Bertie Ahern (FF)	Pat Lee (FG)	Tony Gregory (Ind.)	Dermot Fitzpatrick (FF)	John Stafford (FF)
27th	1992	Bertie Ahern (FF)	Jim Mitchell (FG)	Tony Gregory (Ind.)	Joe Costello (Lab)	4 seats 1992–2016
28th	1997	Bertie Ahern (FF)	Jim Mitchell (FG)	Tony Gregory (Ind.)	Marian McGennis (FF)	4 seats 1992–2016
29th	2002	Bertie Ahern (FF)	Dermot Fitzpatrick (FF)	Tony Gregory (Ind.)	Joe Costello (Lab)	4 seats 1992–2016
30th	2007	Bertie Ahern (FF)	Cyprian Brady (FF)	Tony Gregory (Ind.)	Joe Costello (Lab)	4 seats 1992–2016
30th	2009 by-election	Bertie Ahern (FF)	Cyprian Brady (FF)	Maureen O'Sullivan (Ind.)	Joe Costello (Lab)	4 seats 1992–2016
31st	2011	Mary Lou McDonald (SF)	Paschal Donohoe (FG)	Maureen O'Sullivan (Ind.)	Joe Costello (Lab)	4 seats 1992–2016
32nd	2016	Mary Lou McDonald (SF)	Paschal Donohoe (FG)	Maureen O'Sullivan (Ind.)	3 seats 2016–2020	
33rd	2020	Mary Lou McDonald (SF)	Paschal Donohoe (FG)	Gary Gannon (SD)	Neasa Hourigan (GP)	4 seats from 2020
34th	2024	Mary Lou McDonald (SF)	Paschal Donohoe (FG)	Gary Gannon (SD)	Marie Sherlock (Lab)	4 seats from 2020
34th	2026 by-election	Mary Lou McDonald (SF)	Daniel Ennis (SD)	Gary Gannon (SD)	Marie Sherlock (Lab)	4 seats from 2020
