= Paul Murphy (Irish politician) =

Irish politician (born 1983)

Paul Murphy TD
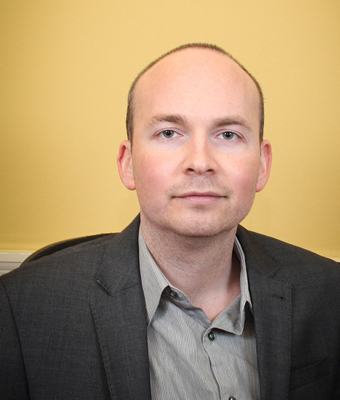
- Murphy in 2016

Teachta Dála
- Incumbent
- Assumed office October 2014
- Constituency: Dublin South-West

Member of the European Parliament
- In office 6 April 2011 – 24 May 2014
- Constituency: Dublin

Personal details
- Born: 13 April 1983 (age 43) Dublin, Ireland
- Party: RISE; People Before Profit; People Before Profit–Solidarity
- Other political affiliations: Socialist Party (2001–2019)
- Domestic partner: Jess Spear
- Children: 1
- Education: University College Dublin

Paul Murphy (born 13 April 1983) is an Irish People Before Profit–Solidarity politician who has been a Teachta Dála (TD) for the Dublin South-West constituency since the 2014 Dublin South-West by-election. He served as a Member of the European Parliament (MEP) for the Dublin constituency from 2011 to 2014.

He was previously a member of the Socialist Party and Solidarity, but left in September 2019 to form a new party, RISE. In February 2021, RISE joined People Before Profit as a network, and Murphy became a TD for the party.

== Early and personal life ==
Murphy grew up in Goatstown, a suburb of Dublin. His father Kieran Murphy was a senior manager at the Irish division of Mars. His uncle Michael Murphy was a journalist and broadcaster at RTÉ. His family is originally from Castlebar, County Mayo. He attended St Kilian's German School in Clonskeagh and later studied for the Leaving Certificate at the Institute of Education, before going on to graduate from University College Dublin with a degree in law in 2004. He joined the Socialist Party in 2001. In 2004, he ran unsuccessfully for President of the UCD Students' Union. Murphy also worked in the European Parliament as a political advisor to the MEP Joe Higgins.

A 2008 short film described him as a full-time activist for the Socialist Party. It followed his involvement in protests against cutbacks at Tallaght Hospital, during the Irish financial crisis. He was also active in Free Education for Everyone, a group that campaigned against the reintroduction of fees for third-level education in Ireland. In 2009, he worked on a PhD thesis titled Does socialist law exist?.

He was a member of the Socialist Party National Committee from 2001 and the National Executive Committee until 2010.

Murphy's partner is Jess Spear, a member of South Dublin County Council, and their first child was born in 2023. Their child will be raised gender neutral.

== European Parliament: 2011–2014 ==
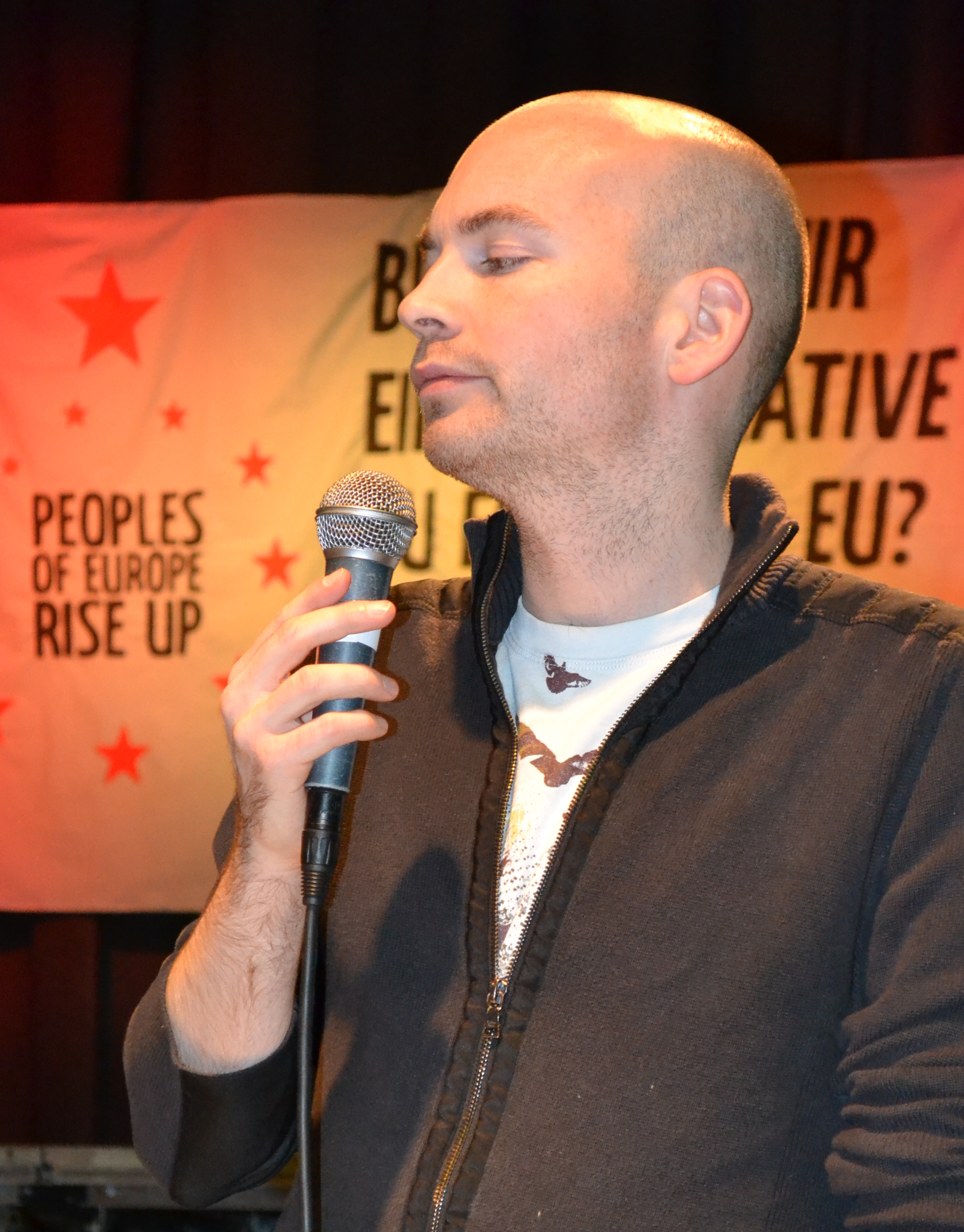
Murphy in 2013

Murphy replaced Joe Higgins in the European Parliament after Higgins was elected to Dáil Éireann at the 2011 general election. Murphy sat as a full member on the European Parliament Committee on International Trade and as a substitute on the Employment and Social Affairs and Petitions committees. He was also a full member of the South Asia delegation and a substitute on the Central Asia delegation.

In 2011, Murphy participated in Freedom Flotilla II, which attempted to breach Israel's blockade of the Gaza Strip. In August 2011, he visited the "No TAV" Italian campaign against the Turin–Lyon high-speed railway. A supporter of the Shell to Sea campaign, in August 2011, he and others were forcibly removed from a protest by Gardaí. A complaint was submitted to the Garda Síochána Ombudsman Commission alleging unreasonable use of force. In early November 2011, Murphy was reported to be part of another Gaza flotilla described as a humanitarian mission. Israeli forces boarded the ship on 4 November and imprisoned Murphy and all the other activists on board, with one of them saying this was carried out in a "violent and dangerous" manner. Israel deported Murphy on 11 November.

In 2012, Murphy set up the website ScamBridge.org for people wishing to share their experiences of the government's JobBridge scheme. In June 2013, he travelled to Istanbul, Turkey, to speak with activists participating in the Gezi Park protests. In 2013 while discussing the Israel-Palestine conflict, Murphy argued that "Palestinians have a right to defend themselves against that aggression and that may involve armed defence against soldiers".

Murphy stood for re-election at the 2014 European Parliament election, at which he lost his seat. During the campaign he put his election posters on display before the official campaign start date, a move which risked fines of up to €150,000. He said "people wouldn't be bothered" and defended the move as a response to Fianna Fáil candidate Mary Fitzpatrick, who had also put up her posters early. Dún Laoghaire–Rathdown County Council and South Dublin County Council forced him to remove them. During the campaign, the Broadcasting Authority of Ireland (BAI) upheld a complaint against the Irish state broadcaster RTÉ which excluded Murphy from a report on the findings of a Sunday Business Post/Red C opinion poll on a news programme which they aired on 3 May 2014.

== Dáil Éireann: 2014–present ==
Elections to the Dáil
Party	Election		FPv	FPv%	Result
Anti-Austerity Alliance	Dublin South-West	2014 by-election	6,540	27.2	Elected on count 8/8
AAA–PBP (Note: Murphy was a member of Anti-Austerity Alliance.)	Dublin South-West	2016	9,005	13.4	Elected on count 12/16
Solidarity–PBP (Note: Murphy is a member of RISE.)	Dublin South-West	2020	4,477	6.6	Elected on count 8/11
PBP–Solidarity (Note: Murphy is a member of RISE and People Before Profit.)	Dublin South-West	2024	5,081	7.6	Elected on count 11/11

Murphy was elected to Dáil Éireann for the Anti-Austerity Alliance, at the 2014 Dublin South-West by-election. He was re-elected to the Dáil for the Dublin South-West constituency at the 2016 general election, as a member of the AAA–PBP grouping. He left the Socialist Party in September 2019, but did not leave the parliamentary group (known since 2020 as People Before Profit-Solidarity).

On 30 September 2019, Murphy announced a new political group called RISE (Radical Internationalist Socialist Environmentalist). He was re-elected at the 2020 general election as a RISE candidate.

In February 2021, Murphy became a member of People Before Profit after RISE's entry into the party.

Murphy has advocated in favour of Irish neutrality. In April 2022, he defended the decision of his and fellow People Before Profit TDs not applauding Volodymyr Zelenskyy's address to the Dáil.

In September 2022, Murphy was assaulted by protesters outside Leinster House while leaving the Dáíl, and in April 2023 his family home was targeted by protestors. The following month, Murphy said in an interview on RTÉ Radio that a threat had been made against his wife at a canvassing event.

He was re-elected at the 2024 Irish general election.

=== Jobstown protests and criminal proceedings ===
As a TD for the Anti-Austerity Alliance and member of the Socialist Party, Murphy took a leading role in the We Won't Pay campaign, an anti-water charges organisation advocating non-payment. He spoke at many rallies and protests against both the charges and the Fine Gael-Labour Party coalition government. His role during a protest against Tánaiste Joan Burton, in Jobstown, Dublin on 15 November 2014, brought criticism from some quarters after Burton's car was blocked by protestors, and she was unable to leave it for over two hours. Afterward, Murphy distanced himself from the actions of some protestors but defended the right to peaceful protest.

On 9 February 2015, he was arrested by Gardaí at his home, in relation to the Jobstown protest, and taken into custody along with three other anti-austerity activists. He was released without charge that afternoon.

On 12 August 2015, Paul Reynolds reported on RTÉ's Nine O'Clock News bulletin that Murphy and others would be charged and that trials would occur in the Circuit Court, where penalties are harsher, instead of the District Court. On 15 September 2015, Murphy was served a summons by the Gardaí on charges of false imprisonment of Joan Burton and her assistant. On 29 June 2017, Murphy and five other defendants, including Solidarity Councillors Kieran Mahon and Mick Murphy, were found not guilty of all charges.

Dáil	Election	Deputy (Party)	Deputy (Party)	Deputy (Party)	Deputy (Party)	Deputy (Party)
13th	1948	Seán MacBride (CnaP)	Peadar Doyle (FG)	Bernard Butler (FF)	Michael O'Higgins (FG)	Robert Briscoe (FF)
14th	1951	Seán MacBride (CnaP)	Peadar Doyle (FG)	Bernard Butler (FF)	Michael ffrench-O'Carroll (Ind.)	Robert Briscoe (FF)
15th	1954	Seán MacBride (CnaP)	Peadar Doyle (FG)	Bernard Butler (FF)	Michael O'Higgins (FG)	Robert Briscoe (FF)
15th	1956 by-election	Seán MacBride (CnaP)	Noel Lemass (FF)	Bernard Butler (FF)	Michael O'Higgins (FG)	Robert Briscoe (FF)
16th	1957	James Carroll (Ind.)	Noel Lemass (FF)	Bernard Butler (FF)	Michael O'Higgins (FG)	Robert Briscoe (FF)
16th	1959 by-election	James Carroll (Ind.)	Noel Lemass (FF)	Richie Ryan (FG)	Michael O'Higgins (FG)	Robert Briscoe (FF)
17th	1961	James Carroll (Ind.)	Noel Lemass (FF)	Richie Ryan (FG)	James O'Keeffe (FG)	Robert Briscoe (FF)
18th	1965	John O'Connell (Lab)	Noel Lemass (FF)	Richie Ryan (FG)	Joseph Dowling (FF)	Ben Briscoe (FF)
19th	1969	John O'Connell (Lab)	Noel Lemass (FF)	Seán Dunne (Lab)	Joseph Dowling (FF)	4 seats 1969–1977
19th	1970 by-election	John O'Connell (Lab)	Noel Lemass (FF)	Seán Sherwin (FF)	Joseph Dowling (FF)	4 seats 1969–1977
20th	1973	John O'Connell (Lab)	Noel Lemass (FF)	Declan Costello (FG)	Joseph Dowling (FF)	4 seats 1969–1977
20th	1976 by-election	John O'Connell (Lab)	Brendan Halligan (Lab)	Declan Costello (FG)	Joseph Dowling (FF)	4 seats 1969–1977
21st	1977	Constituency abolished. See Dublin Ballyfermot				

Dáil	Election	Deputy (Party)	Deputy (Party)	Deputy (Party)	Deputy (Party)	Deputy (Party)
22nd	1981	Seán Walsh (FF)	Larry McMahon (FG)	Mary Harney (FF)	Mervyn Taylor (Lab)	4 seats 1981–1992
23rd	1982 (Feb)	Seán Walsh (FF)	Larry McMahon (FG)	Mary Harney (FF)	Mervyn Taylor (Lab)	4 seats 1981–1992
24th	1982 (Nov)	Seán Walsh (FF)	Michael O'Leary (FG)	Mary Harney (FF)	Mervyn Taylor (Lab)	4 seats 1981–1992
25th	1987	Seán Walsh (FF)	Chris Flood (FF)	Mary Harney (PDs)	Mervyn Taylor (Lab)	4 seats 1981–1992
26th	1989	Pat Rabbitte (WP)	Chris Flood (FF)	Mary Harney (PDs)	Mervyn Taylor (Lab)	4 seats 1981–1992
27th	1992	Pat Rabbitte (DL)	Chris Flood (FF)	Mary Harney (PDs)	Mervyn Taylor (Lab)	Éamonn Walsh (Lab)
28th	1997	Pat Rabbitte (DL)	Chris Flood (FF)	Mary Harney (PDs)	Conor Lenihan (FF)	Brian Hayes (FG)
29th	2002	Pat Rabbitte (Lab)	Charlie O'Connor (FF)	Seán Crowe (SF)	Conor Lenihan (FF)	4 seats 2002–2016
30th	2007	Pat Rabbitte (Lab)	Charlie O'Connor (FF)	Brian Hayes (FG)	Conor Lenihan (FF)	4 seats 2002–2016
31st	2011	Pat Rabbitte (Lab)	Eamonn Maloney (Lab)	Brian Hayes (FG)	Seán Crowe (SF)	4 seats 2002–2016
31st	2014 by-election	Pat Rabbitte (Lab)	Eamonn Maloney (Lab)	Paul Murphy (AAA)	Seán Crowe (SF)	4 seats 2002–2016
32nd	2016	Colm Brophy (FG)	John Lahart (FF)	Paul Murphy (AAA–PBP)	Seán Crowe (SF)	Katherine Zappone (Ind.)
33rd	2020	Colm Brophy (FG)	John Lahart (FF)	Paul Murphy (S–PBP)	Seán Crowe (SF)	Francis Noel Duffy (GP)
34th	2024	Colm Brophy (FG)	John Lahart (FF)	Paul Murphy (PBP–S)	Seán Crowe (SF)	Ciarán Ahern (Lab)
