= 1976 Dublin South-West by-election =

By-election to the 20th Dáil

- 10 June 1976
- Turnout: 24,991 (53.7%)
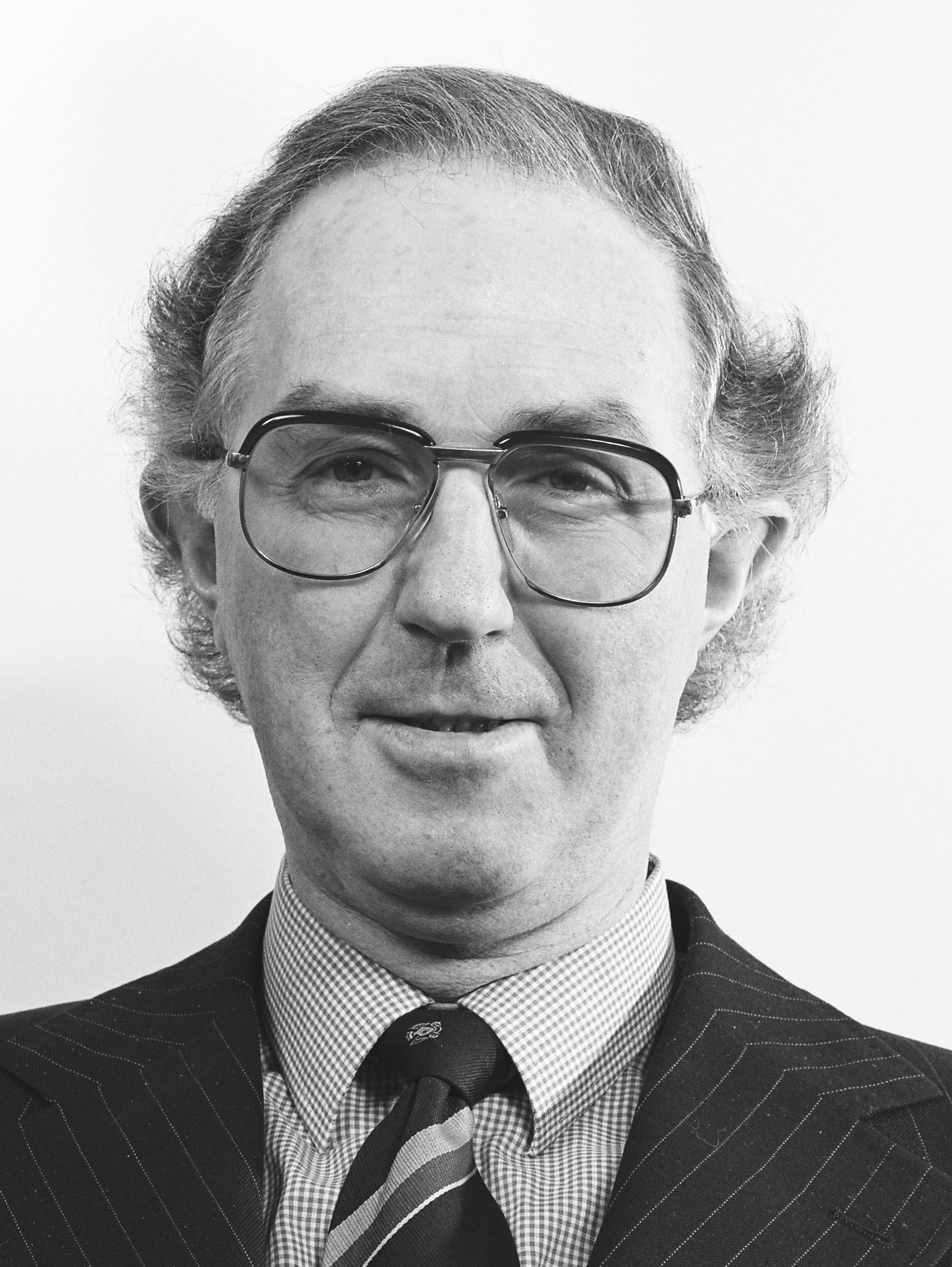

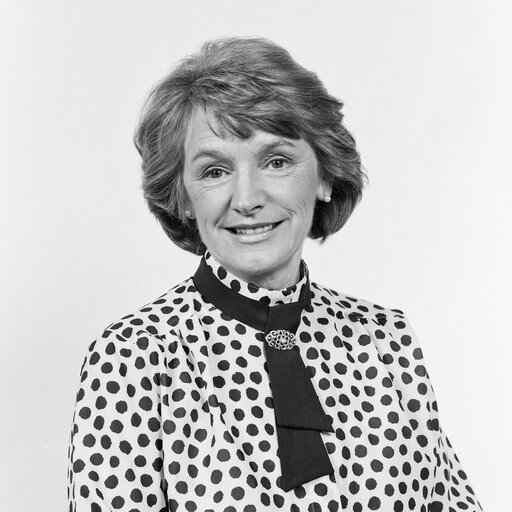

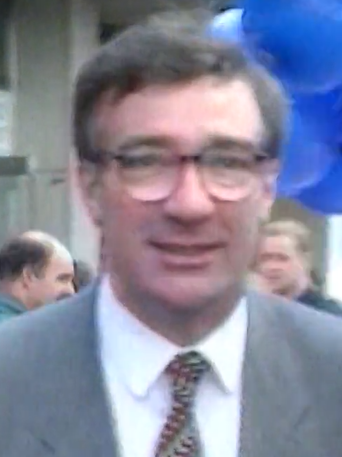
Nominee	Brendan Halligan	Eileen Lemass	Jim Mitchell
Party	Labour	Fianna Fáil	Fine Gael
First preferences	6,870	9,687	5,169
Percentage	27.5%	38.8%	20.7%
Final count	12,099	11,462	–
TD before election
Noel Lemass
Fianna Fáil
TD after election
Brendan Halligan
Labour

A Dáil by-election was held in the constituency of Dublin South-West in Ireland on Thursday, 10 June 1976, to fill a vacancy in the 20th Dáil. It followed the death of Fianna Fáil Teachta Dála (TD) Noel Lemass on 13 April 1976.

The writ of election was moved by Fianna Fáil TD Patrick Lalor on 20 May 1976 and was agreed by the Dáil. A by-election in Donegal North-East was held the same day.

The Fianna Fáil candidate was Eileen Lemass, widow of the deceased TD. The by-election was won by the Labour candidate Brendan Halligan, who was a member of the 13th Seanad as a Taoiseach's nominee. This was the last by-election until the 2011 Dublin West by-election in which a government party won a seat which had been held by an opposition party. (Note: The few subsequent government-party by-election wins were vacancies from the Ceann Comhairle who had been elected for a government party (1980 Donegal) or government parties (1982 Galway East).)

At the 1977 general election, Halligan stood in the new Dublin Finglas constituency but was not elected, and was never subsequently re-elected to the Dáil. He briefly returned to the Seanad as a Taoiseach's nominee after the loss of his Dáil seat. He was a Member of the European Parliament from 1983 to 1984.

== Result ==
1976 Dublin South-West by-election
Party	Candidate	FPv%	Count					
Party	Candidate	FPv%	1	2	3	4	5	6
Fianna Fáil	Eileen Lemass	38.8	9,687	9,694	9,722	10,108	10,578	11,462
Labour	Brendan Halligan	27.5	6,870	6,886	6,924	7,175	7,855	12,099
Fine Gael	Jim Mitchell	20.7	5,169	5,174	5,196	5,345	5,612	
Official Sinn Féin	Tomás Mac Giolla	6.7	1,679	1,702	1,815	2,158		
Aontacht Éireann	Kevin Boland	4.8	1,186	1,199	1,292			
Irish Republican Socialist	Íte Ní Chionnaith	1.2	287	332				
Marxist–Leninist	Bláthnaid Ní Chinnéide	0.5	113					
Electorate: 46,585 Valid: 24,991 Quota: 12,496 Turnout: 53.7%
