= JobPath =

Irish government organization

JobPath is an approach to employment activation in Ireland which caters mainly for people who are long-term unemployed to assist them to secure and sustain full-time paid employment or self-employment.

Following the completion of a public procurement process, contracts to deliver JobPath were signed with two companies – Seetec Limited and Turas Nua Limited. These companies are providing JobPath services in two contract areas that are based on the department's divisional structure.
