= 2019 South Dublin County Council election =

Part of the 2019 Irish local elections

- 24 May 2019

All 40 seats on South Dublin County Council 21 seats needed for a majority
	First party	Second party	Third party
Party	Fianna Fáil	Fine Gael	Sinn Féin
Seats won	8 / 40	7 / 40	6 / 40
Seat change	▲3	Steady	▼3
	Fourth party	Fifth party	Sixth party
Party	Green	Labour	Solidarity
Seats won	4 / 40	2 / 40	2 / 40
Seat change	▲3	▼2	▼1
	Seventh party	Eighth party	Ninth party
Party	Social Democrats	People Before Profit	Independent
Seats won	1 / 40	1 / 40	9 / 40
Seat change	▲1	▼2	▲1
- Results by local electoral area
Council control before election
Sinn Féin
Labour Party
Green Party
Council control after election
Fianna Fáil
Fine Gael
Green Party

An election to all 40 seats on South Dublin County Council was held on 24 May 2019 as part of the 2019 Irish local elections. South Dublin was divided into 7 local electoral areas (LEAs) to elect councillors for a five-year term of office on the electoral system of proportional representation by means of the single transferable vote (PR-STV).

== Boundary review ==
Following the recommendations of the 2018 LEA boundary review committee, the boundaries in South Dublin were altered, as two of the LEAs at the 2014 South Dublin County Council election exceeded the upper limit of 7 councillors set by the 2018 Committee. Changes were also made to reflect population shifts revealed in the 2016 census.

== Results by party ==
Party	Seats	±	1st pref	FPv%	±%
Fianna Fáil	8	▲3	14,931	19.02	▲5.65
Fine Gael	7	Steady	13,735	17.49	▼0.54
Sinn Féin	6	▼3	9,106	11.60	▼12.36
Green	4	▲3	7,559	9.63	▲7.46
Labour	2	▼2	6,604	8.41	▼1.80
Solidarity	2	▼1	3,832	4.88	▲0.28
Social Democrats	1	▲1	3,880	4.94	New
People Before Profit	1	▼2	2,997	3.82	▼0.90
Aontú	0	Steady	659	0.84	New
Renua	0	Steady	631	0.80	New
Inds. 4 Change	0	Steady	392	0.50	New
Workers' Party	0	Steady	227	0.29	▼0.93
Independent	9	▲1	13,190	16.80	▼4.35
Total	40	Steady	78,513	100.00	

== Results by local electoral area ==
*: Outgoing councillor elected in 2014.
†: Outgoing councillor coopted subsequent to the 2014 election.
‡: Outgoing councillor elected in 2014 in Lucan for People Before Profit, contesting both Lucan and Palmerstown–Fonthill.

=== Clondalkin ===
Clondalkin: 7 seats
Party	Candidate	FPv%	Count							
Party	Candidate	FPv%	1	2	3	4	5	6	7	8
Fine Gael	Emer Higgins (Note: Changed party, see table for details.)	17.36%	1,966							
Independent	Francis Timmons	11.45%	1,297	1,327	1,368	1,468				
Independent	Eoin Ó Broin	10.22%	1,158	1,192	1,229	1,309	1,330	1,416		
Fianna Fáil	Trevor Gilligan	8.93%	1,011	1,076	1,086	1,123	1,127	1,149	1,499	
Labour	Robert Dowds	8.44%	956	1,003	1,009	1,044	1,049	1,060	1,183	1,211
Green	Peter Kavanagh	8.17%	925	979	1,011	1,107	1,116	1,155	1,229	1,250
Fine Gael	Kenny Egan	8.12%	920	1,166	1,174	1,203	1,206	1,231	1,366	1,400
Fianna Fáil	Cathal O'Donoghue	7.01%	794	835	842	853	854	866		
Sinn Féin	William Joseph Carey	6.78%	768	774	783	867	872	1,396	1,431	
Sinn Féin	Lisa Kinsella-Coleman	6.37%	722	738	747	828	833			
People Before Profit	Kevin Creagh	5.27%	597	601	628					
Inds. 4 Change	David Moore	1.28%	145	151						
Independent	Shakeel Jeeroburkan	0.60%	68	69						
Electorate: 29,616 Valid: 11,327 Spoilt: 417 Quota: 1,416 Turnout: 11,744 (39.65%)

=== Firhouse–Bohernabreena ===
Firhouse–Bohernabreena: 5 seats
Party	Candidate	FPv%	Count							
Party	Candidate	FPv%	1	2	3	4	5	6	7	8
Fianna Fáil	Deirdre O'Donovan	21.00%	2,344							
Green	Francis Noel Duffy	16.34%	1,823	1,889						
Fine Gael	Brian Lawlor	15.66%	1,748	1,838	1,842	2,087				
Fianna Fáil	Emma Murphy	13.89%	1,550	1,757	1,766	1,805	1,864			
Independent	Alan Edge	7.20%	804	843	845	866	883	1,005	1,188	1,429
Sinn Féin	Sarah Holland	6.50%	725	732	734	737	744	875	958	
Social Democrats	Rob Hunter	5.71%	637	656	659	671	689	861	1,090	1,386
Labour	Aideen Carberry	5.30%	591	617	623	637	738	756		
Solidarity	Jess Spear	5.01%	559	567	568	580	584			
Fine Gael	Becky Smith	3.40%	379	400	401					
Electorate: 25,877 Valid: 11,160 Spoilt: 356 Quota: 1,861 Turnout: 11,516 (44.5%)

=== Lucan ===
Lucan: 5 seats
Party	Candidate	FPv%	Count										
Party	Candidate	FPv%	1	2	3	4	5	6	7	8	9	10	11
Independent	Paul Gogarty	15.82%	1,509	1,534	1,571	1,595							
Fine Gael	Vicki Casserly	13.80%	1,316	1,328	1,340	1,353	1,368	1,422	1,474	1,522	1,523	2,032	
Independent	Liona O'Toole	11.53%	1,100	1,119	1,147	1,188	1,258	1,298	1,399	1,589	1,591		
Labour	Joanna Tuffy	9.23%	880	907	916	926	952	1,015	1,136	1,223	1,224	1,350	1,517
Fianna Fáil	Ed O'Brien	8.46%	807	814	839	844	867	1,084	1,129	1,163	1,163	1,252	1,352
Fine Gael	Caroline Brady	7.54%	719	728	737	747	761	823	850	874			
Social Democrats	Anne-Marie McNally	5.90%	563	574	577	594	651	693	796	989	990	1,037	1,121
Fianna Fáil	Caitríona McClean	5.72%	546	559	573	577	600						
People Before Profit	Kellie Sweeney	5.13%	489	504	508	544	681	708	790				
Green	Vanessa Mulhall	4.97%	474	503	526	549	608	645					
Sinn Féin	Derren Ó Brádaigh	4.96%	473	476	482	529							
Inds. 4 Change	Ruth Nolan	2.59%	247	249	255								
Renua	Howard Hughes	2.41%	230	234									
Independent	Anwar Ul Haq Malik	1.94%	185										
Electorate: 21,723 Valid: 9,538 Spoilt: 192 Quota: 1,590 Turnout: 9,730 (44.79%)

=== Palmerstown–Fonthill ===
Palmerstown–Fonthill: 5 seats
Party	Candidate	FPv%	Count										
Party	Candidate	FPv%	1	2	3	4	5	6	7	8	9	10	11
Sinn Féin	Mark Ward	17.14%	1,460										
Independent	Alan Hayes	11.50%	980	980	1,002	1,060	1,109	1,131	1,161	1,238	1,295	1,322	1,385
Independent	Guss O'Connell	10.14%	864	865	887	923	951	981	1,008	1,062	1,131	1,165	1,274
People Before Profit	Madeleine Johansson	8.65%	737	741	753	764	803	892	959	1,026	1,122	1,245	1,289
Fianna Fáil	Shane Moynihan	8.38%	714	715	730	735	739	758	783	802	827	987	1,169
Fine Gael	Derek Keating	7.39%	630	630	650	657	664	679	704	744	760	803	
Independent	Paul Gogarty	7.00%	596	597	608	631	649	683	720	791	844	902	1,090
Fianna Fáil	Jonathan Graham	6.60%	562	566	570	577	586	595	597	632	655		
Sinn Féin	Danny O'Brien	4.54%	387	411	418	423	448	476	502	523			
Labour	David Eaton	3.91%	333	334	350	367	397	407	460				
Green	David Morrison	3.64%	310	310	323	333	341	360					
Inds. 4 Change	Ruth Nolan	3.52%	300	301	312	317	330						
Workers' Party	David Gardiner	2.66%	227	228	233								
Independent	Stephen Dunne	2.58%	220	220	231								
Independent	Sikandar Jahanzab	2.35%	200	201									
Electorate: 25,112 Valid: 8,520 Spoilt: 395 Quota: 1,421 Turnout: 8,915 (35.5%)

=== Rathfarnham–Templeogue ===
Rathfarnham–Templeogue: 7 seats
Party	Candidate	FPv%	Count								
Party	Candidate	FPv%	1	2	3	4	5	6	7	8	9
Green	William Priestley	14.10%	2,868								
Independent	Ronan McMahon	12.19%	2,480	2,511	2,531	2,565					
Labour	Pamela Kearns	10.91%	2,220	2,269	2,283	2,333	2,355	2,396	2,544		
Fianna Fáil	Paul Foley	8.53%	1,735	1,746	1,752	1,767	1,782	1,866	1,911	1,995	2,127
Fine Gael	Mary Seery Kearney	7.85%	1,597	1,617	1,621	1,628	1,806	1,843	1,868	2,286	2,504
Social Democrats	Carly Bailey	7.03%	1,431	1,489	1,539	1,640	1,647	1,688	2,145	2,174	2,428
Fine Gael	David McManus	6.60%	1,342	1,367	1,377	1,383	1,518	1,597	1,620	2,023	2,280
Labour	Paddy Cosgrave	5.77%	1,174	1,214	1,228	1,249	1,282	1,314	1,356	1,438	
Fianna Fáil	Yvonne Collins	8.01%	1,635	1,654	1,664	1,682	1,727	1,835	1,861	1,950	2,171
Fine Gael	Conor McMahon	4.84%	984	997	998	1,004	1,171	1,212	1,228		
Solidarity	Stephen Nugent	3.61%	734	746	905	1,071	1,074	1,150			
Aontú	John Phelan	3.24%	659	669	678	714	722				
Fine Gael	Lynn McCrave	3.08%	626	639	642	647					
Sinn Féin	Robert Russell	2.54%	516	524	547						
People Before Profit	John Flanagan	1.68%	341	357							
Electorate: 40,863 Valid: 20,342 Spoilt: 506 Quota: 2,543 Turnout: 20,848 (51.02%)

=== Tallaght Central ===
Tallaght Central: 6 seats
Party	Candidate	FPv%	Count										
Party	Candidate	FPv%	1	2	3	4	5	6	7	8	9	10	11
Fianna Fáil	Charlie O'Connor	17.11%	2,018										
Independent	Mick Duff	12.57%	1,483	1,530	1,590	1,614	1,727						
Sinn Féin	Cathal King	10.68%	1,260	1,279	1,292	1,308	1,331	1,335	1,358	1,744			
Green	Liam Sinclair	7.69%	907	934	976	1,017	1,084	1,094	1,168	1,195	1,206	1,269	1,561
Fianna Fáil	Teresa Costello	6.87%	810	874	914	926	957	960	1,238	1,270	1,278	1,326	1,563
Fine Gael	Teresa Duffy	6.57%	775	797	827	837	894	900	990	1,007	1,009	1,040	
Solidarity	Kieran Mahon	6.41%	756	764	784	857	881	885	899	941	956	1,461	1,521
Social Democrats	Sandra Ruiz	6.19%	730	746	766	845	890	896	925	961	970	1,056	1,198
Solidarity	Mick Murphy	5.89%	695	713	724	812	846	851	869	923	937		
Sinn Féin	Cora McCann	4.93%	581	599	607	640	663	665	678				
Fianna Fáil	Declan Burke	4.51%	532	589	620	622	647	649					
Labour	Denis Mackin	3.82%	450	467	482	490							
Renua	Anne Marie Condren	3.40%	401	408									
People Before Profit	Laura O'Reilly	3.36%	396	409	423								
Electorate: 29,367 Valid: 11,794 Spoilt: 449 Quota: 1,685 Turnout: 12,243 (41.69%)

=== Tallaght South ===
Tallaght South: 5 seats
Party	Candidate	FPv%	Count							
Party	Candidate	FPv%	1	2	3	4	5	6	7	8
Sinn Féin	Paddy Holohan	14.95%	872	893	906	922	969	971	1,048	
Fine Gael	Baby Pereppadan	12.57%	733	756	804	899	914	914	966	984
Sinn Féin	Dermot Richardson	12.24%	714	733	743	775	794	795	836	854
Solidarity	Sandra Fay	11.03%	643	669	690	722	984			
Sinn Féin	Louise Dunne	10.77%	628	639	648	677	693	693	783	839
Social Democrats	Marie Corr	8.90%	519	529	583	619	641	641	786	786
Solidarity	Brian Leech	7.63%	445	467	479	490				
People Before Profit	Emma Hendrick	7.49%	437	457	486	521	597	605		
Fianna Fáil	Fiona Nolan	5.88%	343	360	390					
Green	Suzanne McEneaney	4.32%	252	268						
Independent	Ray Kelly	4.22%	246							
Electorate: 22,494 Valid: 5,832 Spoilt: 220 Quota: 973 Turnout: 6,052 (27%)

== Results by gender ==
2019 South Dublin County Council election Candidates by gender
Gender	Number of candidates	% of candidates	Elected councillors	% of councillors
Men	56	60.9%	26	65.0%
Women	36	39.1%	14	35.0%
TOTAL	92		40	

== Changes after 2019 ==
=== Co-options ===
Party	Outgoing	LEA	Reason	Date	Co-optee
Sinn Féin	Mark Ward	Palmerstown–Fonthill	Elected to the 32nd Dáil for Dublin Mid-West in the 2019 by-election	13 January 2020	Lisa Colman
Green	Francis Noel Duffy	Firhouse–Bohernabreena	Elected to the 33rd Dáil for Dublin South-West in the 2020 general election	24 February 2020	Clare O'Byrne
Fine Gael	Emer Higgins	Clondalkin	Elected to the 33rd Dáil for Dublin Mid-West in the 2020 general election	24 February 2020	Shirley O'Hara
Fine Gael	Mary Seery Kearney	Rathfarnham–Templeogue	Nominated by the Taoiseach to the 26th Seanad	14 September 2020	Lynn McCrave
Green	William Priestley	Rathfarnham–Templeogue	Resignation; joined the Garda Síochána	14 September 2020	Laura Donaghy
Sinn Féin	Lisa Colman	Palmerstown–Fonthill	Resignation on 21 October 2020	14 December 2020	Derren Ó Brádaigh
Green	Clare O'Byrne	Firhouse–Bohernabreena	Resignation on 8 Mar 2021	10 April 2021	Suzanne McEneaney
PBP–Solidarity	Sandra Fay	Tallaght South	Resignation on 27 April 2021	June 2021	Leah Whelan
Green	Suzanne McEneaney	Firhouse–Bohernabreena	Resignation	February 2022	Lyn Hagin Meade
Green	Peter Kavanagh	Clondalkin	Resignation	October 2022	Laura Donaghy
Green	Laura Donaghy	Rathfarnham-Templeogue	Resignation	January 2023	Mark Lynch
Fianna Fáil	Deirdre O'Donovan	Firhouse-Bohernabreena	Resignation	June 2023	Lilian Guéret
Rabharta	Liam Sinclair	Tallaght Central	Resignation	November 2023	Vanessa Mulhall (Green)
Social Democrats	Carly Bailey	Rathfarnham–Templeogue	Resignation	November 2023	Justin Sinnott

=== Changes in affiliation ===
Name	LEA	Elected as	New affiliation	Date
Liam Sinclair	Tallaght Central	Green	Independent	19 January 2021
Peter Kavanagh	Clondalkin	Green	Independent	25 January 2021
Paddy Holohan	Tallaght South	Sinn Féin	Independent	January 2021
Liam Sinclair	Tallaght Central	Independent	Rabharta	June 2021
Eoin Ó Broin	Clondalkin	Independent	Social Democrats	24 January 2022
