= New Vision (electoral alliance) =

Defunct Irish political party

- Leader: None
- Founded: February 2011
- Political position: Independent

New Vision was an electoral alliance of independent candidates formed to contest the 2011 Irish general election.

The formation of the group was announced at a meeting in Dublin organised by the economist David McWilliams on 31 January 2011. Eamonn Blaney, son of former Independent Fianna Fáil Teachta Dála and minister Neil Blaney, stated that he was launching "a movement called New Vision" and that the group would run candidates in the upcoming general election. He stated that New Vision already had the allegiance of "several strong Independents who will unite around four principles".

The group held a press launch on 9 February 2011 where they revealed the 19 candidates that had agreed to run under the New Vision label. Each candidate had committed to vote en bloc on four issues, but were free to campaign on other national and local issues as they wished. As well as Eamonn Blaney, prominent candidates were his brother MacDara, and Luke 'Ming' Flanagan.

The four core issues which each New Vision candidate agreed to support were described by the group as:

1. The separation of bank debt and sovereign debt
2. A viable strategy to create jobs
3. The overhaul of politics and the public service
4. A better deal for the country's natural resources.

The number of independent candidates in the New Vision alliance subsequently rose to 20.

A different political party called Fís Nua, which means "New Vision" in Irish, also ran candidates in the 2011 general election. Eamonn Blaney stated that he was "unaware of the existence" of Fís Nua when he registered the business and domain names for New Vision.

== Results ==
The candidates in the New Vision alliance received the following votes at the 2011 general election. One candidate, Luke 'Ming' Flanagan was elected.

Constituency	Candidate	1st Pref. votes	Notes
Cavan–Monaghan	John McGuirk	1,708	Eliminated after second count
Cork East	Paul O'Neill	1,056	Eliminated after second count
Cork North-Central	Pádraig O'Sullivan	1,020	Eliminated after sixth count
Cork South-Central	David McCarthy	880	Eliminated after fifth count
Cork South-West	David McInerney	493	Eliminated after first count
Cork South-West	Paul Doonan	239	Eliminated after first count
Donegal North-East	MacDara Blaney	1,228	Eliminated after fourth count
Donegal North-East	Ryan Stewart	203	Eliminated after first count
Donegal South-West	Ann Sweeney	255	Eliminated after second count
Dublin North-East	Eamonn Blaney	1,773	Eliminated after seventh count
Dublin North-West	Michael J Loftus	217	Eliminated after third count
Dún Laoghaire	Mick Crawford	394	Eliminated after third count
Kerry North–West Limerick	Mick Reidy	357	Eliminated after third count
Longford–Westmeath	David D'Arcy	159	Eliminated after first count
Louth	Thomas Clare	2,233	Eliminated after eighth count
Mayo	Martin Daly	893	Eliminated after third count
Meath East	Sharon Keogan	1,168	Eliminated after first count
Roscommon–South Leitrim	Luke 'Ming' Flanagan	8,925	Elected on fourth count
Sligo–North Leitrim	Alwyn Love	779	Eliminated after third count
Tipperary North	Billy Clancy	1,442	Eliminated after second count

== Political careers after New Vision ==
Luke 'Ming' Flanagan, the only successful candidate in the general election, went on to be elected as an independent MEP for North-West in 2014 and re-elected in 2019. Padraig O'Sullivan was elected as a Fianna Fáil candidate to the Dáil in the 2019 Cork North-Central by-election, and re-elected in 2020. Sharon Keogan was elected to the Seanad in 2020 as an independent.
