= Pádraig O'Sullivan =

Irish politician (born 1984)

Pádraig O'Sullivan TD
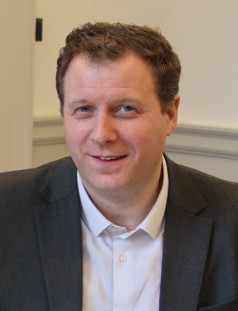
- O'Sullivan in 2024

Teachta Dála
- Incumbent
- Assumed office November 2019
- Constituency: Cork North-Central

Personal details
- Born: 11 May 1984 (age 41) Cork, Ireland
- Party: Fianna Fáil (since 2012)
- Other political affiliations: New Vision (2011)

Pádraig O'Sullivan (born 11 May 1984) is an Irish Fianna Fáil politician who has been a Teachta Dála (TD) for the Cork North-Central constituency since the 2019 by-election.

He was a member of Cork County Council for the Cobh local electoral area from 2014 to 2019. Before he joined Fianna Fail in July 2012, he ran as an independent as part of the New Vision alliance at the 2011 general election. Sheila O'Callaghan was co-opted to O'Sullivan's seat on Cork County Council following his election to the Dáil.

At the general election in February 2020, O'Sullivan was re-elected in his Cork North-Central constituency.

At the 2024 general election, O'Sullivan was re-elected to the Dáil.

A teacher by prior profession, O'Sullivan taught Irish and history at Coláiste an Chraoibhín, Fermoy. He lives in Glanmire with his wife, Bernie, and their three children.

Dáil	Election	Deputy (Party)	Deputy (Party)	Deputy (Party)	Deputy (Party)	Deputy (Party)
22nd	1981	Toddy O'Sullivan (Lab)	Liam Burke (FG)	Denis Lyons (FF)	Bernard Allen (FG)	Seán French (FF)
23rd	1982 (Feb)	Toddy O'Sullivan (Lab)	Liam Burke (FG)	Denis Lyons (FF)	Bernard Allen (FG)	Seán French (FF)
24th	1982 (Nov)	Toddy O'Sullivan (Lab)	Liam Burke (FG)	Denis Lyons (FF)	Bernard Allen (FG)	Dan Wallace (FF)
25th	1987	Máirín Quill (PDs)	Liam Burke (FG)	Denis Lyons (FF)	Bernard Allen (FG)	Dan Wallace (FF)
26th	1989	Máirín Quill (PDs)	Gerry O'Sullivan (Lab)	Denis Lyons (FF)	Bernard Allen (FG)	Dan Wallace (FF)
27th	1992	Máirín Quill (PDs)	Gerry O'Sullivan (Lab)	Liam Burke (FG)	Bernard Allen (FG)	Dan Wallace (FF)
27th	1994 by-election	Máirín Quill (PDs)	Kathleen Lynch (DL)	Liam Burke (FG)	Bernard Allen (FG)	Dan Wallace (FF)
28th	1997	Billy Kelleher (FF)	Noel O'Flynn (FF)	Liam Burke (FG)	Bernard Allen (FG)	Dan Wallace (FF)
29th	2002	Billy Kelleher (FF)	Noel O'Flynn (FF)	Kathleen Lynch (Lab)	Bernard Allen (FG)	Dan Wallace (FF)
30th	2007	Billy Kelleher (FF)	Noel O'Flynn (FF)	Kathleen Lynch (Lab)	Bernard Allen (FG)	4 seats from 2007
31st	2011	Billy Kelleher (FF)	Jonathan O'Brien (SF)	Kathleen Lynch (Lab)	Dara Murphy (FG)	4 seats from 2007
32nd	2016	Billy Kelleher (FF)	Jonathan O'Brien (SF)	Mick Barry (AAA–PBP)	Dara Murphy (FG)	4 seats from 2007
32nd	2019 by-election	Pádraig O'Sullivan (FF)	Jonathan O'Brien (SF)	Mick Barry (AAA–PBP)	Dara Murphy (FG)	4 seats from 2007
33rd	2020	Pádraig O'Sullivan (FF)	Thomas Gould (SF)	Mick Barry (S–PBP)	Colm Burke (FG)	4 seats from 2007
34th	2024	Pádraig O'Sullivan (FF)	Thomas Gould (SF)	Eoghan Kenny (Lab)	Colm Burke (FG)	Ken O'Flynn (II)
