= Emer Higgins =

Irish politician (born 1986)

Emer Higgins TD
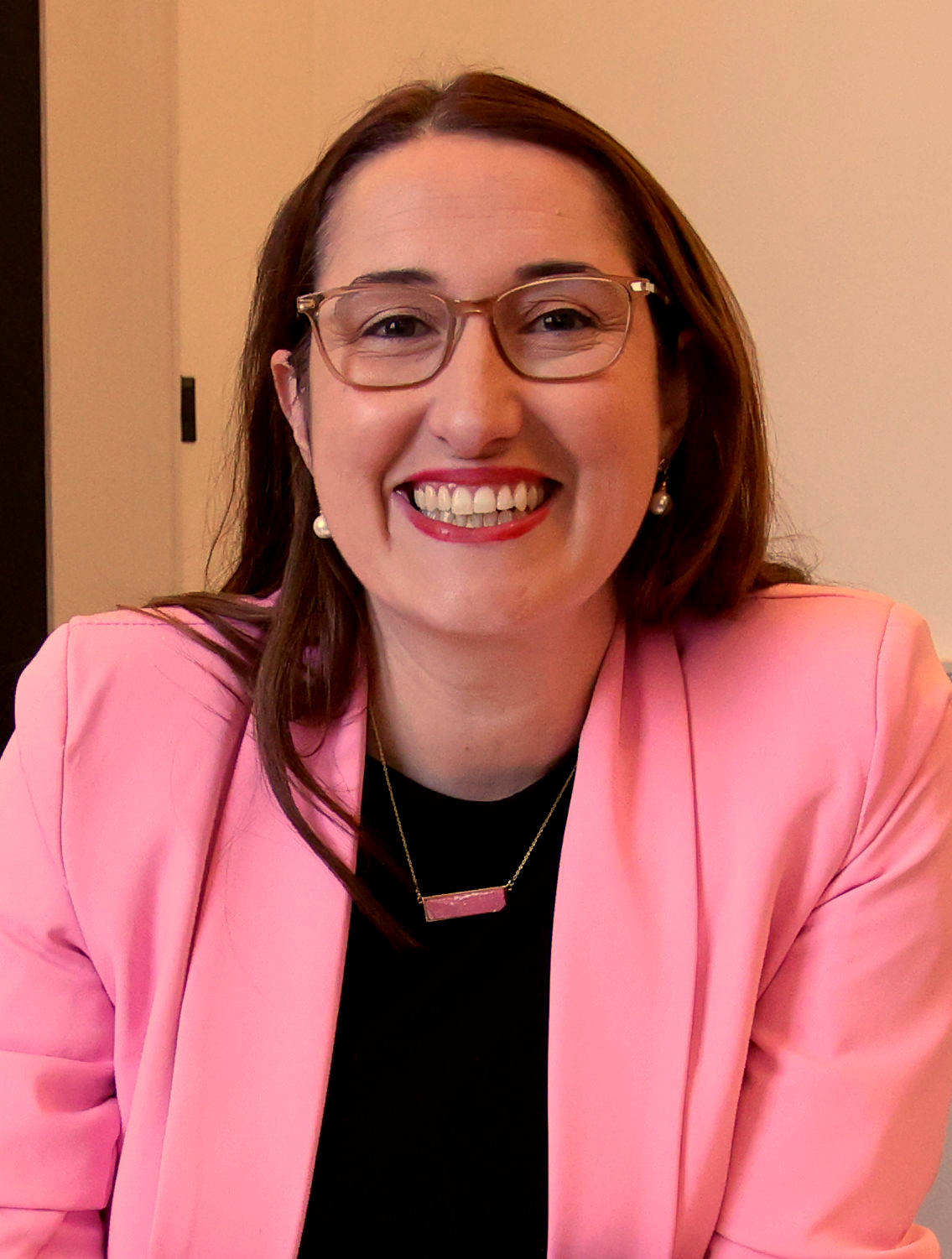
- Higgins in 2024

Minister of State
- 2025–: Children, Disability and Equality
- 2025: Public Expenditure, Infrastructure, Public Service Reform and Digitalisation
- 2024–2025: Enterprise, Trade and Employment

Teachta Dála
- Incumbent
- Assumed office February 2020
- Constituency: Dublin Mid-West

Personal details
- Born: 1986, aged 40–41 years Dublin, Ireland
- Party: Fine Gael
- Education: University College Dublin

Emer Higgins (born 1986) is an Irish Fine Gael politician who has served as a Minister of State since 2024, and a Teachta Dála (TD) for the Dublin Mid-West constituency since the 2020 general election.

== Early life and education ==
Higgins attended Holy Family Community School in Rathcoole, County Dublin.

Higgins attended University College Dublin and was a member of its students' union. She graduated with an Honours Degree in Economics and Sociology, and is now a member of its Governing Authority.

== Political career ==
Higgins worked for a period of five years as an assistant to Frances Fitzgerald from 2009 to 2013.

Higgins was co-opted as a member of South Dublin County Council in 2011 and continued as a councillor until she was elected a TD in 2020. She also continued to work as chief of staff of global operations for PayPal from 2013 to 2020.

Higgins served as leader of the Fine Gael group on South Dublin County Council and as Chair of the Land Use, Planning and Transport SPC Strategic Policy Committee.

In 2019, Higgins was the Fine Gael candidate at the 2019 Dublin Mid-West by-election where she was beaten by the Sinn Féin candidate Mark Ward.

In November 2019, Higgins apologised for an incident in 2014, in which she delivered a letter to her constituents where she expressed "delight" over cancelled plans for accommodation for Irish Travellers in Newcastle, County Dublin.

At the 2020 general election, Higgins was one of two Fine Gael candidates in Dublin Mid-West and was elected to one of four seats in the constituency. Following Higgins's election to the Dáil, Shirley O'Hara was co-opted to her seat on South Dublin County Council.

In May 2022, Higgins was criticised on social media for her "months-long campaign" and work with Simon Coveney to rename An Post's Passport Express service as Post Passport, as it was not quick enough. Critics described her video announcing the change as "tone deaf" and asked whether there were not more important issues for elected representatives to deal with.

On 10 April 2024, Higgins was appointed as Minister of State at the Department of Enterprise, Trade and Employment with responsibility for Business, Employment and Retail.

On 30 June 2024, Higgins announced that she would be asking Dublin City Council to pause the Dublin City Centre Transport Plan. The move followed public criticism of the plan by Ibec and the Dublin City Traders Alliance but faced criticism from Minister for Transport Eamon Ryan and from several Dublin City councillors as well as advocacy groups I BIKE Dublin and the Dublin Commuter Coalition. Her intervention was described by some councillors as "inappropriate", an "outrageous overreach" and an instance "of big business dictating to the city", and by Ivana Bacik, the leader of the Labour Party as "a really inappropriate intervention by a junior minister seeking it seems to derail the traffic plan agreed for Dublin City Council by councillors”.

On 29 January 2025, Higgins was appointed as Minister of State at the Department of Public Expenditure, Infrastructure, Public Service Reform and Digitalisation with special responsibility for Public Procurement, Digitalisation and eGovernment.

In November 2025, Higgins was appointed as Minister of State at the Department of Children, Disability and Equality. She was also made a super junior minister, one of four ministers of state in attendance at cabinet, but without a vote.

Political offices
Preceded by Neale Richmond	Minister of State at the Department of Enterprise, Trade and Employment; 2024–2025	Succeeded by Alan Dillon
Preceded by Ossian Smyth	Minister of State at the Department of Public Expenditure, Infrastructure, Public Service Reform and Digitalisation; Jan.–Nov. 2025	Succeeded by Frank Feighan
Preceded by Hildegarde Naughton	Minister of State at the Department of Children, Disability and Equality; 2025–present	Incumbent

Dáil	Election	Deputy (Party)	Deputy (Party)	Deputy (Party)	Deputy (Party)	Deputy (Party)
29th	2002	Paul Gogarty (GP)	3 seats 2002–2007	Mary Harney (PDs)	John Curran (FF)	4 seats 2002–2024
30th	2007	Paul Gogarty (GP)	Joanna Tuffy (Lab)	Mary Harney (PDs)	John Curran (FF)	4 seats 2002–2024
31st	2011	Robert Dowds (Lab)	Joanna Tuffy (Lab)	Frances Fitzgerald (FG)	Derek Keating (FG)	4 seats 2002–2024
32nd	2016	Gino Kenny (AAA–PBP)	Eoin Ó Broin (SF)	Frances Fitzgerald (FG)	John Curran (FF)	4 seats 2002–2024
32nd	2019 by-election	Gino Kenny (AAA–PBP)	Eoin Ó Broin (SF)	Mark Ward (SF)	John Curran (FF)	4 seats 2002–2024
33rd	2020	Gino Kenny (S–PBP)	Eoin Ó Broin (SF)	Mark Ward (SF)	Emer Higgins (FG)	4 seats 2002–2024
34th	2024	Paul Gogarty (Ind.)	Eoin Ó Broin (SF)	Mark Ward (SF)	Emer Higgins (FG)	Shane Moynihan (FF)
