= Mary White (Green Party politician) =

Irish former politician (born 1948)

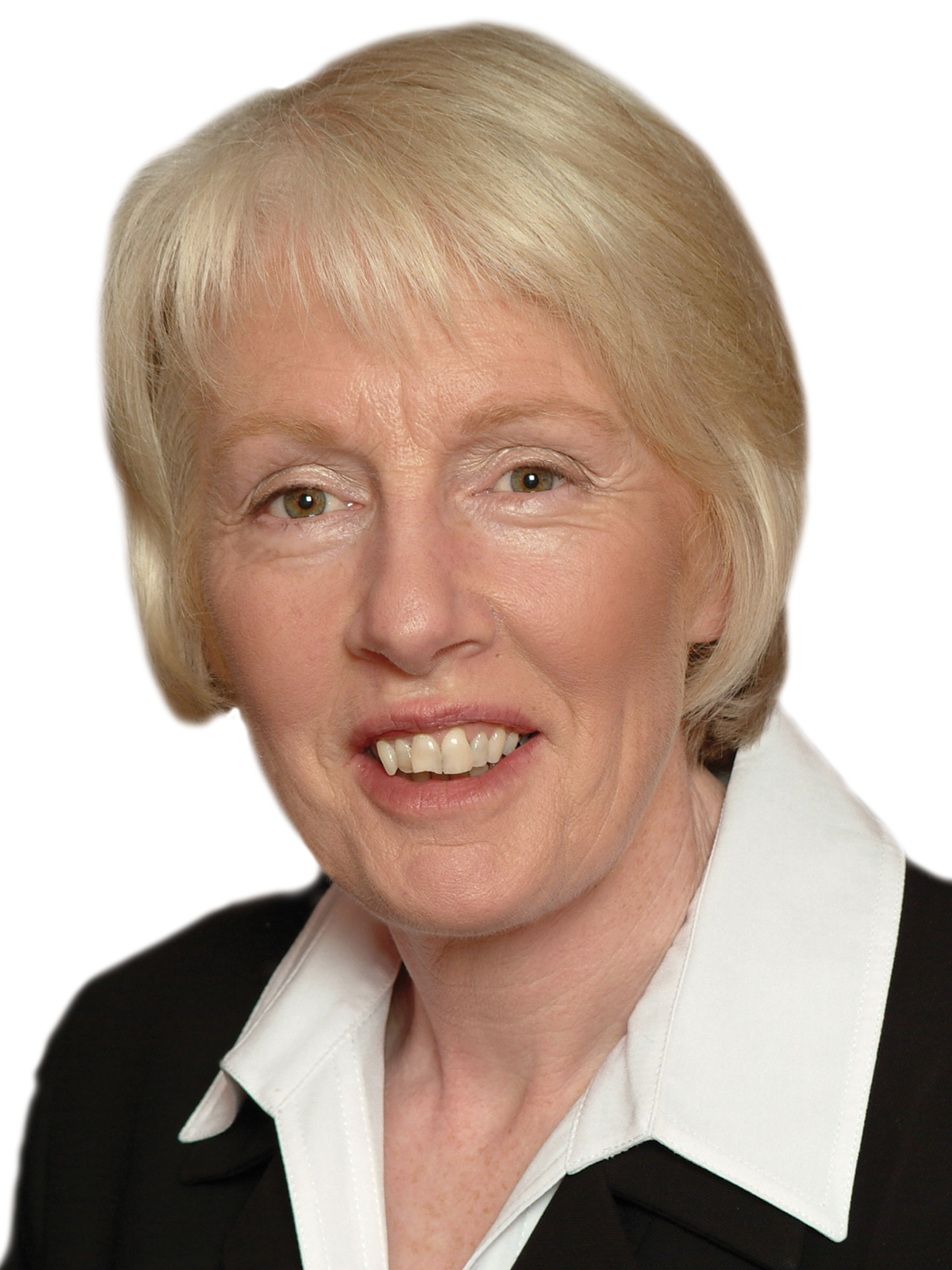

Minister of State
- 2010–2011: Community, Equality and Gaeltacht Affairs
- 2010–2011: Education and Skills
- 2010–2011: Justice and Law Reform

Deputy leader of the Green Party
- In office 5 October 2001 – 11 June 2011
- Leader: Trevor Sargent; John Gormley
- Preceded by: Office Created
- Succeeded by: Catherine Martin

Teachta Dála
- In office May 2007 – February 2011
- Constituency: Carlow–Kilkenny

Personal details
- Born: 24 November 1948 (age 77) Bray, County Wicklow, Ireland
- Party: Green Party
- Spouse: Robert White (m. 1984)
- Children: 1
- Education: Trinity College Dublin

Mary White (born 24 November 1948) is an Irish former Green Party politician who served as a Minister of State from 2010 to 2011 and Deputy leader of the Green Party from 2001 to 2011. She served as a Teachta Dála (TD) for the Carlow–Kilkenny constituency from 2007 to 2011.

== Early and personal life ==
White was born in Bray, County Wicklow, educated at the Ursuline Convent, Waterford and Trinity College Dublin. At Trinity, she was a founding member of the English Society and received a Pink (award) for sporting excellence. She is married to Robert White and has one daughter. They have lived in Borris, County Carlow since 1987. She has co-edited a book on walking in the Blackstairs Mountains with Joss Lynam and authored another, Environment, Mining and Politics. She is also a keen hill-walker, linguist and organic grower.

== Political career ==
She was an unsuccessful candidate at the 1997 general election and 2002 general election, but was elected to Carlow County Council at the 1999 local elections. She topped the poll in the Borris local electoral area, and was re-elected at the 2004 local elections, serving until 2007. She also ran for Seanad Éireann in 2002 but only received 35 votes.

In 2004, she was the Green Party candidate at the European Parliament election for the East constituency, seeking to succeed outgoing Green MEP Nuala Ahern. She secured 5.6% of the first preference vote but was not elected.

She was elected to Dáil Éireann at the 2007 general election, making her the first female TD elected for the Green party and for the Carlow–Kilkenny constituency.

On 23 March 2010, as part of a reshuffle, she was appointed as Minister of State at the Department of Justice and Law Reform, at the Department of Children and Youth Affairs and the Department of Education and Skills, with special responsibility for Equality, Human Rights and Integration.

She resigned as Minister of State on 23 January 2011, when the Green Party withdrew from government.

She lost her seat at the 2011 general election. She was subsequently replaced as Deputy leader of the Green Party by Catherine Martin.

Political offices
Preceded by John Curran as Minister of State at the Department of Community, Rural and Gaeltacht Affairs	Minister of State at the Department of Community, Equality and Gaeltacht Affairs; 2010–2011	Office vacant
Preceded by Conor Lenihan; John Moloney as Minister of State at the Department of Justice, Equality and Law Reform	Minister of State at the Department of Justice and Law Reform; 2010–2011; With: John Moloney	Succeeded by Kathleen Lynch as Minister of State at the Department of Justice and Equality

Dáil	Election	Deputy (Party)	Deputy (Party)	Deputy (Party)	Deputy (Party)	Deputy (Party)
2nd	1921	Edward Aylward (SF)	W. T. Cosgrave (SF)	James Lennon (SF)	Gearóid O'Sullivan (SF)	4 seats 1921–1923
3rd	1922	Patrick Gaffney (Lab)	W. T. Cosgrave (PT-SF)	Denis Gorey (FP)	Gearóid O'Sullivan (PT-SF)	4 seats 1921–1923
4th	1923	Edward Doyle (Lab)	W. T. Cosgrave (CnaG)	Denis Gorey (FP)	Michael Shelly (Rep)	Seán Gibbons (CnaG)
4th	1925 by-election	Edward Doyle (Lab)	W. T. Cosgrave (CnaG)	Denis Gorey (FP)	Michael Shelly (Rep)	Thomas Bolger (CnaG)
5th	1927 (Jun)	Edward Doyle (Lab)	W. T. Cosgrave (CnaG)	Denis Gorey (CnaG)	Thomas Derrig (FF)	Richard Holohan (FP)
6th	1927 (Sep)	Edward Doyle (Lab)	W. T. Cosgrave (CnaG)	Peter de Loughry (CnaG)	Thomas Derrig (FF)	Richard Holohan (FP)
6th	1927 by-election	Edward Doyle (Lab)	Denis Gorey (CnaG)	Peter de Loughry (CnaG)	Thomas Derrig (FF)	Richard Holohan (FP)
7th	1932	Francis Humphreys (FF)	Denis Gorey (CnaG)	Desmond FitzGerald (CnaG)	Thomas Derrig (FF)	Seán Gibbons (FF)
8th	1933	James Pattison (Lab)	Richard Holohan (NCP)	Desmond FitzGerald (CnaG)	Thomas Derrig (FF)	Seán Gibbons (FF)
9th	1937	Constituency abolished. See Kilkenny and Carlow–Kildare				

Dáil	Election	Deputy (Party)	Deputy (Party)	Deputy (Party)	Deputy (Party)	Deputy (Party)
13th	1948	James Pattison (NLP)	Thomas Walsh (FF)	Thomas Derrig (FF)	Joseph Hughes (FG)	Patrick Crotty (FG)
14th	1951	Francis Humphreys (FF)	Thomas Walsh (FF)	Thomas Derrig (FF)	Joseph Hughes (FG)	Patrick Crotty (FG)
15th	1954	James Pattison (Lab)	Thomas Walsh (FF)	Thomas Derrig (FF)	Joseph Hughes (FG)	Patrick Crotty (FG)
15th	1956 by-election	James Pattison (Lab)	Martin Medlar (FF)	Thomas Derrig (FF)	Joseph Hughes (FG)	Patrick Crotty (FG)
16th	1957	Francis Humphreys (FF)	Martin Medlar (FF)	Jim Gibbons (FF)	Joseph Hughes (FG)	Patrick Crotty (FG)
16th	1960 by-election	Patrick Teehan (FF)	Martin Medlar (FF)	Jim Gibbons (FF)	Joseph Hughes (FG)	Patrick Crotty (FG)
17th	1961	Séamus Pattison (Lab)	Martin Medlar (FF)	Jim Gibbons (FF)	Desmond Governey (FG)	Patrick Crotty (FG)
18th	1965	Séamus Pattison (Lab)	Tom Nolan (FF)	Jim Gibbons (FF)	Desmond Governey (FG)	Patrick Crotty (FG)
19th	1969	Séamus Pattison (Lab)	Tom Nolan (FF)	Jim Gibbons (FF)	Desmond Governey (FG)	Kieran Crotty (FG)
20th	1973	Séamus Pattison (Lab)	Tom Nolan (FF)	Jim Gibbons (FF)	Desmond Governey (FG)	Kieran Crotty (FG)
21st	1977	Séamus Pattison (Lab)	Tom Nolan (FF)	Jim Gibbons (FF)	Liam Aylward (FF)	Kieran Crotty (FG)
22nd	1981	Séamus Pattison (Lab)	Tom Nolan (FF)	Desmond Governey (FG)	Liam Aylward (FF)	Kieran Crotty (FG)
23rd	1982 (Feb)	Séamus Pattison (Lab)	Jim Gibbons (FF)	Desmond Governey (FG)	Liam Aylward (FF)	Kieran Crotty (FG)
24th	1982 (Nov)	Séamus Pattison (Lab)	M. J. Nolan (FF)	Dick Dowling (FG)	Liam Aylward (FF)	Kieran Crotty (FG)
25th	1987	Séamus Pattison (Lab)	M. J. Nolan (FF)	Martin Gibbons (PDs)	Liam Aylward (FF)	Kieran Crotty (FG)
26th	1989	Séamus Pattison (Lab)	M. J. Nolan (FF)	Phil Hogan (FG)	Liam Aylward (FF)	John Browne (FG)
27th	1992	Séamus Pattison (Lab)	M. J. Nolan (FF)	Phil Hogan (FG)	Liam Aylward (FF)	John Browne (FG)
28th	1997	Séamus Pattison (Lab)	John McGuinness (FF)	Phil Hogan (FG)	Liam Aylward (FF)	John Browne (FG)
29th	2002	Séamus Pattison (Lab)	John McGuinness (FF)	Phil Hogan (FG)	Liam Aylward (FF)	M. J. Nolan (FF)
30th	2007	Mary White (GP)	John McGuinness (FF)	Phil Hogan (FG)	Bobby Aylward (FF)	M. J. Nolan (FF)
31st	2011	Ann Phelan (Lab)	John McGuinness (FF)	Phil Hogan (FG)	John Paul Phelan (FG)	Pat Deering (FG)
31st	2015 by-election	Ann Phelan (Lab)	John McGuinness (FF)	Bobby Aylward (FF)	John Paul Phelan (FG)	Pat Deering (FG)
32nd	2016	Kathleen Funchion (SF)	John McGuinness (FF)	Bobby Aylward (FF)	John Paul Phelan (FG)	Pat Deering (FG)
33rd	2020	Kathleen Funchion (SF)	John McGuinness (FF)	Jennifer Murnane O'Connor (FF)	John Paul Phelan (FG)	Malcolm Noonan (GP)
34th	2024	Natasha Newsome Drennan (SF)	John McGuinness (FF)	Jennifer Murnane O'Connor (FF)	Catherine Callaghan (FG)	Peter "Chap" Cleere (FF)
