= Minister of State at the Department of Children, Disability and Equality =

List of Irish ministers of state

The minister of state at the Department of Children, Disability and Equality is a junior ministerial post in the Department of Children, Disability and Equality of the Government of Ireland who performs functions delegated by the minister for children, disability and equality. The minister of state does not hold cabinet rank.

As of 2025, there is one minister of state:

- Emer Higgins, TD – Minister of State with special responsibility for disability. Higgins is also a super junior minister, which is a minister of state in attendance at cabinet, but without a vote.

== List of parliamentary secretaries ==
Name	Term of office		Party	Government
Patrick Lindsay	2 July 1956	24 October 1956	Fine Gael	7th
Pádraig Faulkner	21 April 1965	10 March 1968	Fianna Fáil	11th • 12th
Gerry Collins	9 July 1969	9 May 1970	Fianna Fáil	13th
Michael F. Kitt	9 May 1970	5 February 1973	Fianna Fáil	13th

== List of ministers of state ==
=== Department of the Gaeltacht 1978–1993 ===
Name	Term of office		Party	Responsibilities	Government
Michael D'Arcy	16 December 1982	18 February 1986	Fine Gael		19th
Denis Gallagher	12 March 1987	12 July 1989	Fianna Fáil		20th
Pat "the Cope" Gallagher	19 July 1989	11 February 1992	Fianna Fáil		21st
Pat "the Cope" Gallagher	13 February 1992	12 January 1993	Fianna Fáil		22nd
=== Department of Arts, Culture and the Gaeltacht 1993–1997 ===
Name	Term of office		Party	Responsibilities	Government
Pat "the Cope" Gallagher	14 January 1993	9 June 1994	Fianna Fáil	Gaeltacht	23rd
Donal Carey	27 January 1995	26 June 1997	Fine Gael		24th
=== Department of Arts, Heritage, Gaeltacht and the Islands 1997–2002 ===
Name	Term of office		Party	Responsibilities	Government
Éamon Ó Cuív	8 July 1997	19 February 2001	Fianna Fáil	Gaeltacht and the islands	25th
Mary Coughlan	19 February 2001	6 June 2002	Fianna Fáil	Gaeltacht and the islands	25th
=== Department of Community, Rural and Gaeltacht Affairs 2002–2007 ===
Name	Term of office		Party	Responsibilities	Government
Noel Ahern	19 June 2002	29 September 2004	Fianna Fáil	Drugs Strategy and Community Affairs	26th
Pat Carey	20 June 2007	7 May 2008	Fianna Fáil	Drugs Strategy and Community Affairs	27th
Conor Lenihan	20 June 2007	7 May 2008	Fianna Fáil	Integration policy	27th
Conor Lenihan	13 May 2008	22 April 2009	Fianna Fáil	Integration policy	28th
John Curran	13 May 2008	22 April 2009	Fianna Fáil	Drugs Strategy and Community Affairs	28th
John Curran	22 April 2009	23 March 2010	Fianna Fáil	Integration and Community	28th
=== Department of Community, Equality and Gaeltacht Affairs 2010–2011 ===
Name	Term of office		Party	Responsibilities	Government
Mary White	23 March 2010	23 January 2011	Green	Equality, human rights and integration	28th
=== Department of Children, Equality, Disability, Integration and Youth 2020–2025 ===
Name	Term of office		Party	Responsibilities	Government
Anne Rabbitte	1 July 2020	23 January 2025	Fianna Fáil	Disability	32nd • 33rd • 34th
Joe O'Brien	21 December 2022	23 January 2025	Green	Integration	33rd • 34th
=== Department of Children, Disability and Equality 2025–present ===
Name	Term of office		Party	Responsibilities	Government
Hildegarde Naughton	23 January 2025	18 November 2025	Fine Gael	Disability	35th
Emer Higgins	18 November 2025	Incumbent	Fine Gael	Disability	35th
