= 2019 Dublin Fingal by-election =

By-election to the 32nd Dáil

- 29 November 2019
- Turnout: 25,344 (25.6%)
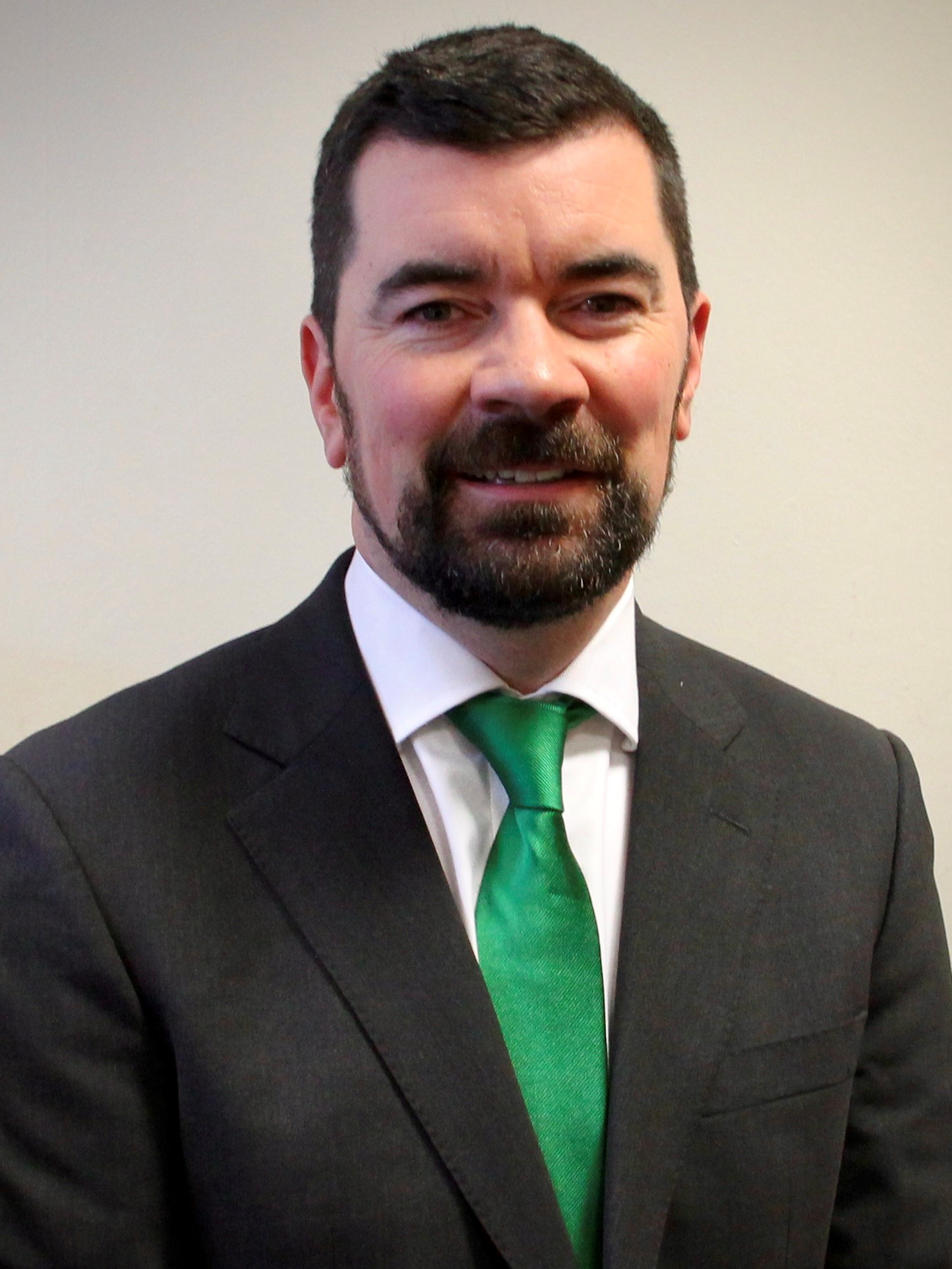

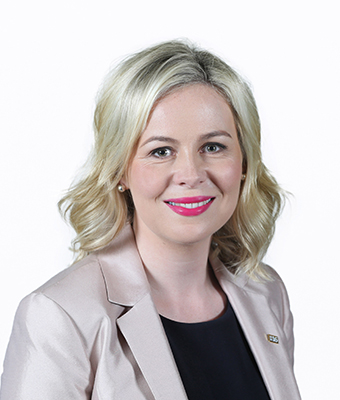

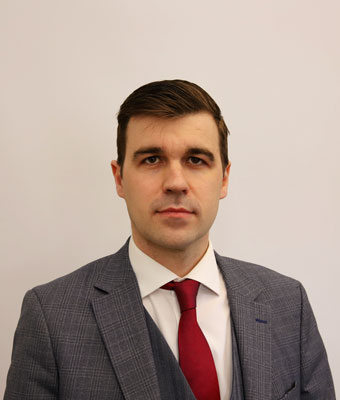
| Nominee | Joe O'Brien | Lorraine Clifford-Lee | Duncan Smith |
| Party | Green | Fianna Fáil | Labour |
| First preferences | 5,744 | 4,631 | 3,821 |
| Percentage | 22.9% | 18.5% | 15.2% |
| Final count | 12,315 | 7,754 | - |
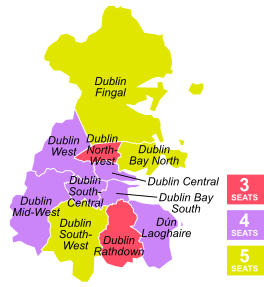
- Dublin Fingal shown within County Dublin
TD before election
Clare Daly
Inds. 4 Change
TD after election
Joe O'Brien
Green

A Dáil by-election was held in the constituency of Dublin Fingal in Ireland on Friday, 29 November 2019, to fill a vacancy in the 32nd Dáil. It followed the election of Independents 4 Change Teachta Dála (TD) Clare Daly to the European Parliament.

It was held on the same day as three other by-elections in Cork North-Central, Dublin Mid-West and Wexford. The Electoral (Amendment) Act 2011 stipulates that a by-election in Ireland must be held within six months of a vacancy occurring. The by-election writ was moved in the Dáil on 7 November 2019.

At the 2016 general election, the electorate of Dublin Fingal was 93,486, and the constituency elected one Fianna Fáil TD, one Independents 4 Change TD, one Fine Gael TD, one Labour Party TD, and one Sinn Féin TD.

The by-election was won by the Green Party candidate Joe O'Brien, a member of Fingal County Councill. It was the first by-election won by a Green Party candidate.

Among the candidates were two Senators Lorraine Clifford-Lee and James Reilly and four Fingal County Councillors Ann Graves, Dean Mulligan, Joe O'Brien and Duncan Smith.

This was the first occasion when by-elections were contested by Independents 4 Change (who also contested Dublin Mid-West) and the Social Democrats (who also contested Cork North-Central and Dublin Mid-West).

== Campaign ==
During the campaign, the Fianna Fáil candidate Lorraine Clifford-Lee was embroiled in controversy when she had to apologise for the language she had used in tweets she had made in 2011, which were derogatory towards the Traveller community.

== Result ==
2019 Dublin Fingal by-election
| Party | Candidate | FPv% | Count | | | | | | | |
| Party | Candidate | FPv% | 1 | 2 | 3 | 4 | 5 | 6 | 7 | 8 |
|---|---|---|---|---|---|---|---|---|---|---|
| Green | Joe O'Brien | 22.9 | 5,744 | 5,837 | 5,965 | 6,091 | 6,784 | 7,984 | 9,183 | 12,315 |
| Fianna Fáil | Lorraine Clifford-Lee | 18.5 | 4,631 | 4,672 | 4,766 | 4,929 | 5,252 | 5,648 | 6,547 | 7,754 |
| Labour | Duncan Smith | 15.2 | 3,821 | 3,866 | 3,926 | 4,008 | 4,347 | 4,999 | 6,300 | |
| Fine Gael | James Reilly | 14.8 | 3,707 | 3,753 | 3,803 | 3,882 | 3,992 | 4,200 | | |
| Inds. 4 Change | Dean Mulligan | 10.2 | 2,550 | 2,606 | 2,745 | 2,909 | 3,754 | | | |
| Sinn Féin | Ann Graves | 5.3 | 1,327 | 1,361 | 1,402 | 1,481 | | | | |
| Social Democrats | Tracey Carey | 4.4 | 1,106 | 1,125 | 1,214 | 1,273 | | | | |
| Independent | Gemma O'Doherty | 4.1 | 1,026 | 1,088 | 1,149 | | | | | |
| Independent | Glenn Brady | 2.7 | 670 | 726 | | | | | | |
| Independent | Peadar O'Kelly | 1.4 | 350 | | | | | | | |
| Independent | Charlie Keddy | 0.4 | 112 | | | | | | | |
| Independent | Cormac McKay | 0.2 | 46 | | | | | | | |
Electorate: 99,039 Valid: 25,090 Spoilt: 254 (1.0%) Quota: 12,546 Turnout: 25,344 (25.6%)
