= Derek Keating =

Irish politician (1955–2023)

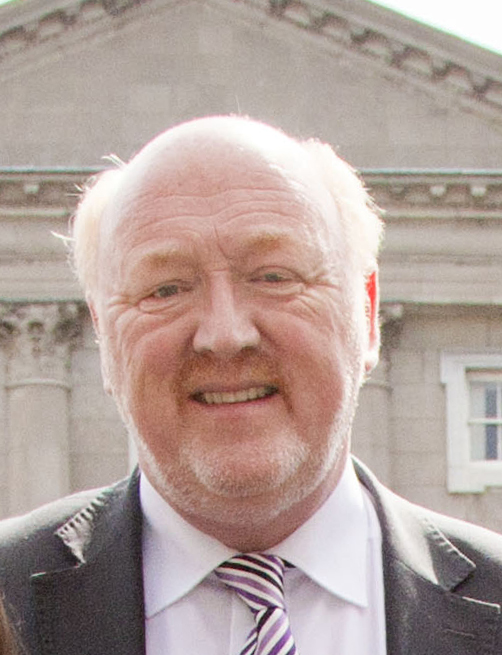
- Keating in 2014

Teachta Dála
- In office February 2011 – February 2016
- Constituency: Dublin Mid-West

Personal details
- Born: 16 May 1955 Ballyfermot, Dublin, Ireland
- Died: 6 May 2023 (aged 67) Dublin, Ireland
- Party: Fine Gael
- Spouse: Anne Keating
- Children: 4

Derek Keating (16 May 1955 – 6 May 2023) was an Irish Fine Gael politician who served as a Teachta Dála (TD) for the Dublin Mid-West constituency from 2011 to 2016. He had also served as a local councillor for Lucan in the South Dublin County Council.

== Background and early career ==
Born on 16 May 1955 and raised in Ballyfermot, Keating spent his early married life in Palmerstown, before moving to Lucan. A former FÁS Community Employment Scheme supervisor at St Mary's Parish Centre, Lucan, Keating was a member of Fianna Fáil during the 1980s, but later joined the Progressive Democrats (PDs). He was a director of elections for Progressive Democrats candidate Tom Morrissey in the Castleknock local electoral area at the 1991 local elections. In 1998, following the constituency boundary revision which created the new constituency of Dublin Mid-West, he left the PDs, and in 1999 stood as an Independent candidate to South Dublin County Council for the Lucan electoral area. He was elected by just four votes over Fine Gael incumbent Peter Brady. Keating was re-elected in 2004, receiving 3,680 votes.

After failing as an Independent candidate for Dublin Mid-West at the 2007 general election, he joined Fine Gael in 2008, and was re-elected as a Fine Gael candidate at the 2009 local elections. He was involved in controversy after taunting the Garda Representative Association's general secretary by issuing the statement: "Mr PJ Stone should put on a uniform and go and do real work and stop rabble-rousing."

== TD (2011-2016) ==
Keating became a TD for Dublin Mid-West in February 2011, serving until 2016 alongside Leo Varadkar, in which Varadkar described Keating as a "hard-working public representative". Keating was re-elected for Fine Gael in 2011 following vote shares in his favor at 26.88 percent in the 2009 elections, which was the strongest votes in the country.

During Budget debates in December 2012, Keating hit out at what he saw as a "Culture of Dependence" in Ireland, saying: "increased dependency on the State encourages a new lifestyle of welfare economy ... a woman will have a lone parent allowance, children’s allowance, rent subsidy, school grants, a medical card, fuel allowance and special payments from the community welfare officer which come under section 13 of the Social Welfare Act for exceptional payments".

Later in December 2012, Keating returned €7,571 of expenses to the Government, following a sample audit of expenses.

Keating was accused in May 2013, in a newspaper article by a school principal in Lucan, of falsely claiming credit for getting an extension to the school. His parliamentary aide, Tommy Morris, was then investigated by the Garda Síochána for taking about 3,000 copies of the Lucan Gazette (which carried the article) from local shops and dumping them. Keating said Morris acted without his knowledge or consent. Fine Gael also condemned the action.

In July 2013, a protest held outside his home by an anti-abortion group led to him leaving as he felt threatened by their behaviour. The protestors had shouted at him to open the door and banged on his front door and windows. He called Gardaí and provided names of people he had recognised. Gardaí said that they had been called but that no arrests were made.

After losing his seat at the 2016 general election, Keating attempted to get re-elected to South Dublin County Council in the 2019 local elections, but did not succeed.

== Personal life ==
Keating was married to Anne, a former deputy school principal, for more than four decades till his death; they had two daughters.

Keating was diagnosed with dementia late in his life; he was reported to be "still doing 5K runs" in late 2022, but his health deteriorated quickly in the following months. He died on 6 May 2023, at the age of 67.

| Dáil | Election | Deputy (Party) | Deputy (Party) | Deputy (Party) | Deputy (Party) | Deputy (Party) |
|---|---|---|---|---|---|---|
| 29th | 2002 | Paul Gogarty (GP) | 3 seats 2002–2007 | Mary Harney (PDs) | John Curran (FF) | 4 seats 2002–2024 |
| 30th | 2007 | Paul Gogarty (GP) | Joanna Tuffy (Lab) | Mary Harney (PDs) | John Curran (FF) | 4 seats 2002–2024 |
| 31st | 2011 | Robert Dowds (Lab) | Joanna Tuffy (Lab) | Frances Fitzgerald (FG) | Derek Keating (FG) | 4 seats 2002–2024 |
| 32nd | 2016 | Gino Kenny (AAA–PBP) | Eoin Ó Broin (SF) | Frances Fitzgerald (FG) | John Curran (FF) | 4 seats 2002–2024 |
| 32nd | 2019 by-election | Gino Kenny (AAA–PBP) | Eoin Ó Broin (SF) | Mark Ward (SF) | John Curran (FF) | 4 seats 2002–2024 |
| 33rd | 2020 | Gino Kenny (S–PBP) | Eoin Ó Broin (SF) | Mark Ward (SF) | Emer Higgins (FG) | 4 seats 2002–2024 |
| 34th | 2024 | Paul Gogarty (Ind.) | Eoin Ó Broin (SF) | Mark Ward (SF) | Emer Higgins (FG) | Shane Moynihan (FF) |
