= Shane Moynihan =

Irish politician

Shane Moynihan TD
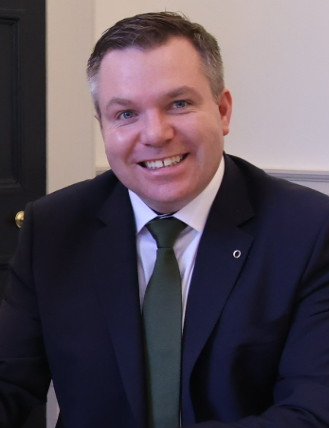
- Moynihan in 2024

Teachta Dála
- Incumbent
- Assumed office November 2024
- Constituency: Dublin Mid-West

Personal details
- Born: 1982/1983 (age 42–43)
- Party: Fianna Fáil
- Education: Trinity College Dublin
- Website: shanemoynihan.ie

Shane Moynihan (born 1982/1983) is an Irish Fianna Fáil politician who has been a Teachta Dála (TD) for the Dublin Mid-West constituency since the 2024 general election.

== Early life ==
Moynihan is a graduate of Trinity College Dublin, where he earned a PhD in political science.

== Political career ==
He was a member of South Dublin County Council for the Palmerstown–Fonthill area from 2019 to 2024. He was a candidate at the 2019 Dublin Mid-West by-election, caused by the departure of Fine Gael's Frances Fitzgerald to the European Parliament, in which Sinn Féin's Mark Ward won the seat.

== Political views ==
The Phoenix has characterised Moynihan as a "traditional Fianna Fáil type" who is committed to the idea of a United Ireland and the restoration of the Irish language. The Phoenix has also described Moynihan as an "Atlanticist" in terms of International Relations.

Dáil	Election	Deputy (Party)	Deputy (Party)	Deputy (Party)	Deputy (Party)	Deputy (Party)
29th	2002	Paul Gogarty (GP)	3 seats 2002–2007	Mary Harney (PDs)	John Curran (FF)	4 seats 2002–2024
30th	2007	Paul Gogarty (GP)	Joanna Tuffy (Lab)	Mary Harney (PDs)	John Curran (FF)	4 seats 2002–2024
31st	2011	Robert Dowds (Lab)	Joanna Tuffy (Lab)	Frances Fitzgerald (FG)	Derek Keating (FG)	4 seats 2002–2024
32nd	2016	Gino Kenny (AAA–PBP)	Eoin Ó Broin (SF)	Frances Fitzgerald (FG)	John Curran (FF)	4 seats 2002–2024
32nd	2019 by-election	Gino Kenny (AAA–PBP)	Eoin Ó Broin (SF)	Mark Ward (SF)	John Curran (FF)	4 seats 2002–2024
33rd	2020	Gino Kenny (S–PBP)	Eoin Ó Broin (SF)	Mark Ward (SF)	Emer Higgins (FG)	4 seats 2002–2024
34th	2024	Paul Gogarty (Ind.)	Eoin Ó Broin (SF)	Mark Ward (SF)	Emer Higgins (FG)	Shane Moynihan (FF)
