= Noel Ahern =

Irish former politician (born 1944)

Minister of State
- 2008–2009: Transport
- 2007–2008: Finance
- 2002–2007: Environment, Heritage and Local Government
- 2002–2007: Community, Rural and Gaeltacht Affairs

Teachta Dála
- In office November 1992 – February 2011
- Constituency: Dublin North-West

Personal details
- Born: 28 December 1944 (age 81) Dublin, Ireland
- Party: Fianna Fáil
- Relatives: Maurice Ahern (brother); Bertie Ahern (brother)
- Education: University College Dublin; College of Commerce, Rathmines

Noel Ahern (born 28 December 1944) is an Irish former Fianna Fáil politician. He served as a Teachta Dála (TD) for the Dublin North-West constituency from 1992 to 2011. He also served as the Minister of State at the Department of Transport with special responsibility for Road Safety from May 2008 to April 2009.

== Early and personal life ==
Born in Drumcondra, Dublin, he was educated at the Christian Brothers O'Connell School, Dublin, University College Dublin and the College of Commerce, Rathmines. He worked as an official with CIÉ before becoming a politician. Ahern is a brother of the former Taoiseach and Fianna Fáil leader, Bertie Ahern and younger brother of former Lord Mayor of Dublin Maurice Ahern.

== Political career ==
He was elected to Dublin City Council in 1985. At the 1992 general election he was elected to Dáil Éireann and was re-elected in every subsequent election until his retirement in 2011.

Between 1994 and 1997, Ahern served as Opposition spokesman on the Environment with special responsibility for Housing. In 1997, he served as Chairman of the Oireachtas All Party Dáil Committee on Social Community and Family Affairs. In 2002, he was appointed as Minister of State at the Department of the Environment, Heritage and Local Government, with responsibility for Housing and Urban Renewal, and at the Department of Community, Rural and Gaeltacht Affairs, with responsibility for Drugs Strategy and Community Affairs. After the 2007 general election, he was appointed as Minister of State at the Department of Finance with special responsibility for the Office of Public Works.

In May 2008, after Brian Cowen became Taoiseach, he was appointed Minister of State at the Department of Transport with special responsibility for Road Safety. In April 2009, Ahern resigned along with all junior ministers, at the request of the Taoiseach, and was not reappointed.

=== Housing affordability controversy ===
Ahern created controversy in June 2006 when, as minister responsible for housing, he claimed that there were many affordable new houses available in Dublin under €200,000. He was quoted as saying there was 'a tendency to get carried away' with the average house price.

Later in that year, Ahern again drew criticism when he described the four interest rate increases up to August 2006 as 'painless' for borrowers.

== Retirement ==
In January 2011, he announced that he would not be contesting the 2011 general election. He receives an annual pension payment of €70,233.

Political offices
New office	Minister of State for Drugs Strategy and Community Affairs; 2002–2007	Succeeded by Pat Carey
Preceded by Bobby Molloy	Minister of State for Housing and Urban Renewal; 2002–2007	Succeeded by Batt O'Keeffe
Preceded by Tom Parlon	Minister of State at the Department of Finance; 2007–2008	Succeeded by Martin Mansergh
New office	Minister of State at the Department of Transport; 2008–2009	Office abolished

Dáil	Election	Deputy (Party)	Deputy (Party)	Deputy (Party)	Deputy (Party)
2nd	1921	Philip Cosgrave (SF)	Joseph McGrath (SF)	Richard Mulcahy (SF)	Michael Staines (SF)
3rd	1922	Philip Cosgrave (PT-SF)	Joseph McGrath (PT-SF)	Richard Mulcahy (PT-SF)	Michael Staines (PT-SF)
4th	1923	Constituency abolished. See Dublin North			

Dáil	Election	Deputy (Party)	Deputy (Party)	Deputy (Party)	Deputy (Party)	Deputy (Party)
9th	1937	Seán T. O'Kelly (FF)	A. P. Byrne (Ind.)	Cormac Breathnach (FF)	Patrick McGilligan (FG)	Archie Heron (Lab)
10th	1938	Seán T. O'Kelly (FF)	A. P. Byrne (Ind.)	Cormac Breathnach (FF)	Patrick McGilligan (FG)	Eamonn Cooney (FF)
11th	1943	Seán T. O'Kelly (FF)	A. P. Byrne (Ind.)	Cormac Breathnach (FF)	Patrick McGilligan (FG)	Martin O'Sullivan (Lab)
12th	1944	Seán T. O'Kelly (FF)	John S. O'Connor (FF)	Cormac Breathnach (FF)	Patrick McGilligan (FG)	Martin O'Sullivan (Lab)
12th	1945 by-election	Vivion de Valera (FF)	John S. O'Connor (FF)	Cormac Breathnach (FF)	Patrick McGilligan (FG)	Martin O'Sullivan (Lab)
13th	1948	Mick Fitzpatrick (CnaP)	A. P. Byrne (Ind.)	Cormac Breathnach (FF)	3 seats from 1948 to 1969	
14th	1951	Declan Costello (FG)	A. P. Byrne (Ind.)	Cormac Breathnach (FF)	3 seats from 1948 to 1969	
14th	1952 by-election	Declan Costello (FG)	Thomas Byrne (Ind.)	Cormac Breathnach (FF)	3 seats from 1948 to 1969	
15th	1954	Declan Costello (FG)	Thomas Byrne (Ind.)	Richard Gogan (FF)	3 seats from 1948 to 1969	
16th	1957	Declan Costello (FG)	Thomas Byrne (Ind.)	Richard Gogan (FF)	3 seats from 1948 to 1969	
17th	1961	Declan Costello (FG)	Michael Mullen (Lab)	Richard Gogan (FF)	3 seats from 1948 to 1969	
18th	1965	Declan Costello (FG)	Michael Mullen (Lab)	Richard Gogan (FF)	3 seats from 1948 to 1969	
19th	1969	Hugh Byrne (FG)	Jim Tunney (FF)	Richard Gogan (FF)	David Thornley (Lab)	4 seats from 1969 to 1977
20th	1973	Hugh Byrne (FG)	Jim Tunney (FF)	Richard Gogan (FF)	David Thornley (Lab)	4 seats from 1969 to 1977
21st	1977	Constituency abolished. See Dublin Finglas and Dublin Cabra				

Dáil	Election	Deputy (Party)	Deputy (Party)	Deputy (Party)	Deputy (Party)
22nd	1981	Jim Tunney (FF)	Michael Barrett (FF)	Mary Flaherty (FG)	Hugh Byrne (FG)
23rd	1982 (Feb)	Jim Tunney (FF)	Michael Barrett (FF)	Mary Flaherty (FG)	Proinsias De Rossa (WP)
24th	1982 (Nov)	Jim Tunney (FF)	Michael Barrett (FF)	Mary Flaherty (FG)	Proinsias De Rossa (WP)
25th	1987	Jim Tunney (FF)	Michael Barrett (FF)	Mary Flaherty (FG)	Proinsias De Rossa (WP)
26th	1989	Jim Tunney (FF)	Michael Barrett (FF)	Mary Flaherty (FG)	Proinsias De Rossa (WP)
27th	1992	Noel Ahern (FF)	Róisín Shortall (Lab)	Mary Flaherty (FG)	Proinsias De Rossa (DL)
28th	1997	Noel Ahern (FF)	Róisín Shortall (Lab)	Pat Carey (FF)	Proinsias De Rossa (DL)
29th	2002	Noel Ahern (FF)	Róisín Shortall (Lab)	Pat Carey (FF)	3 seats from 2002
30th	2007	Noel Ahern (FF)	Róisín Shortall (Lab)	Pat Carey (FF)	3 seats from 2002
31st	2011	Dessie Ellis (SF)	Róisín Shortall (Lab)	John Lyons (Lab)	3 seats from 2002
32nd	2016	Dessie Ellis (SF)	Róisín Shortall (SD)	Noel Rock (FG)	3 seats from 2002
33rd	2020	Dessie Ellis (SF)	Róisín Shortall (SD)	Paul McAuliffe (FF)	3 seats from 2002
34th	2024	Dessie Ellis (SF)	Rory Hearne (SD)	Paul McAuliffe (FF)	3 seats from 2002
