= Pat Carey =

Irish former politician (born 1947)

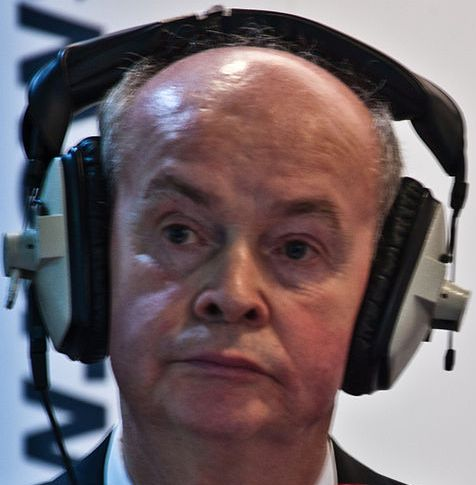
- Carey in 2011

Minister for Community, Equality and Gaeltacht Affairs
- In office 23 March 2010 – 9 March 2011
- Taoiseach: Brian Cowen
- Preceded by: Éamon Ó Cuív
- Succeeded by: Department responsibilities dispersed

Minister for Communications, Energy and Natural Resources
- In office 23 January 2011 – 9 March 2011
- Taoiseach: Brian Cowen
- Preceded by: Eamon Ryan
- Succeeded by: Pat Rabbitte

Minister for Transport
- In office 20 January 2011 – 9 March 2011
- Taoiseach: Brian Cowen
- Preceded by: Noel Dempsey
- Succeeded by: Leo Varadkar (Transport, Tourism and Sport)

Minister of State
- 2008–2010: Government Chief Whip
- 2008–2010: Defence
- 2007–2008: Community, Rural and Gaeltacht Affairs

Teachta Dála
- In office June 1997 – February 2011
- Constituency: Dublin North-West

Personal details
- Born: 9 November 1947 (age 78) Castlemaine, County Kerry, Ireland
- Party: Fianna Fáil
- Education: St Patrick's College, Dublin; University College Dublin; Trinity College Dublin

Pat Carey (born 9 November 1947) is an Irish former Fianna Fáil politician. He was a Teachta Dála (TD) for the Dublin North-West constituency from 1997 to 2011. He served as the Minister for Community, Equality and Gaeltacht Affairs from 2010 to 2011, and also as Government Chief Whip from 2008 to 2010.

== Early and private life ==
Carey was born in Castlemaine, County Kerry in 1947. He was educated at Presentation Brothers College, Milltown, County Kerry and went to St. Patrick's College in Drumcondra, Dublin to complete his teacher training. He subsequently studied at University College Dublin and Trinity College Dublin where he received a Bachelor of Arts degree and a H.Dip. in Education respectively. Before entering politics Carey was a national school teacher and a deputy principal.

Since leaving office, Carey came out as gay, and voiced support for the 2015 marriage equality referendum, saying "My only regret is that I didn't have the courage or confidence to [come out while in politics]. When I look back it's an awful pity I didn't feel able to do that. Nobody stopped me, but I wasn't sure how it would be received."

== Political career ==
Carey entered local politics in 1985 when he was elected to Dublin City Council for the Finglas area. He remained on the council until the abolition of the dual mandate in 2003. He was elected as a Fianna Fáil Teachta Dála (TD) for the constituency of Dublin North-West at the 1997 general election, defeating the sitting Fine Gael TD Mary Flaherty to win a second seat for the Fianna Fáil in the 4-seater constituency. He was re-elected at the 2002 general election.

Re-elected at the 2007 general election, he was appointed as Minister of State at the Department of Community, Rural and Gaeltacht Affairs with special responsibility for Drugs Strategy and Community Affairs. When Brian Cowen became Taoiseach in May 2008, Carey was appointed as Minister of State at the Department of the Taoiseach with responsibility as Government Chief Whip and Active Citizenship and as Minister of State at the Department of Defence.

On 23 March 2010, he was appointed as Minister for Community, Equality and Gaeltacht Affairs. On 20 January 2011, Carey was also appointed as Minister for Transport, following the resignation of Noel Dempsey. On 23 January 2011, Carey was also appointed as Minister for Communications, Energy and Natural Resources, following the resignation of Eamon Ryan.

He lost his seat at the 2011 general election. On 28 March 2011, the Sunday Independent reported that Carey had "appointed another party crony to a key State board on his final day in office".

In November 2015, Carey stepped down as Fianna Fáil's director of elections.

Political offices
| Preceded by Noel Ahern | Minister of State at the Department of Community, Rural and Gaeltacht Affairs with Conor Lenihan; 2007–2008 | Succeeded by John Curran |
| Preceded by Tom Kitt | Government Chief Whip; 2008–2010 | Succeeded by John Curran |
| Preceded by Tom Kitt | Minister of State at the Department of Defence; 2008–2010 | Succeeded by John Curran |
| Preceded by Éamon Ó Cuív as Minister for Community, Rural and Gaeltacht Affairs | Minister for Community, Equality and Gaeltacht Affairs; 2010–2011 | Department responsibilities dispersed |
| Preceded by Noel Dempsey | Minister for Transport; 2011 | Succeeded by Leo Varadkar as Minister for Transport, Tourism and Sport |
| Preceded by Eamon Ryan | Minister for Communications, Energy and Natural Resources; 2011 | Succeeded by Pat Rabbitte |

| Dáil | Election | Deputy (Party) | Deputy (Party) | Deputy (Party) | Deputy (Party) |
|---|---|---|---|---|---|
| 2nd | 1921 | Philip Cosgrave (SF) | Joseph McGrath (SF) | Richard Mulcahy (SF) | Michael Staines (SF) |
| 3rd | 1922 | Philip Cosgrave (PT-SF) | Joseph McGrath (PT-SF) | Richard Mulcahy (PT-SF) | Michael Staines (PT-SF) |
| 4th | 1923 | Constituency abolished. See Dublin North | | | |

| Dáil | Election | Deputy (Party) | Deputy (Party) | Deputy (Party) | Deputy (Party) | Deputy (Party) |
|---|---|---|---|---|---|---|
| 9th | 1937 | Seán T. O'Kelly (FF) | A. P. Byrne (Ind.) | Cormac Breathnach (FF) | Patrick McGilligan (FG) | Archie Heron (Lab) |
| 10th | 1938 | Seán T. O'Kelly (FF) | A. P. Byrne (Ind.) | Cormac Breathnach (FF) | Patrick McGilligan (FG) | Eamonn Cooney (FF) |
| 11th | 1943 | Seán T. O'Kelly (FF) | A. P. Byrne (Ind.) | Cormac Breathnach (FF) | Patrick McGilligan (FG) | Martin O'Sullivan (Lab) |
| 12th | 1944 | Seán T. O'Kelly (FF) | John S. O'Connor (FF) | Cormac Breathnach (FF) | Patrick McGilligan (FG) | Martin O'Sullivan (Lab) |
| 12th | 1945 by-election | Vivion de Valera (FF) | John S. O'Connor (FF) | Cormac Breathnach (FF) | Patrick McGilligan (FG) | Martin O'Sullivan (Lab) |
| 13th | 1948 | Mick Fitzpatrick (CnaP) | A. P. Byrne (Ind.) | Cormac Breathnach (FF) | 3 seats from 1948 to 1969 | |
| 14th | 1951 | Declan Costello (FG) | A. P. Byrne (Ind.) | Cormac Breathnach (FF) | 3 seats from 1948 to 1969 | |
| 14th | 1952 by-election | Declan Costello (FG) | Thomas Byrne (Ind.) | Cormac Breathnach (FF) | 3 seats from 1948 to 1969 | |
| 15th | 1954 | Declan Costello (FG) | Thomas Byrne (Ind.) | Richard Gogan (FF) | 3 seats from 1948 to 1969 | |
| 16th | 1957 | Declan Costello (FG) | Thomas Byrne (Ind.) | Richard Gogan (FF) | 3 seats from 1948 to 1969 | |
| 17th | 1961 | Declan Costello (FG) | Michael Mullen (Lab) | Richard Gogan (FF) | 3 seats from 1948 to 1969 | |
| 18th | 1965 | Declan Costello (FG) | Michael Mullen (Lab) | Richard Gogan (FF) | 3 seats from 1948 to 1969 | |
| 19th | 1969 | Hugh Byrne (FG) | Jim Tunney (FF) | Richard Gogan (FF) | David Thornley (Lab) | 4 seats from 1969 to 1977 |
| 20th | 1973 | Hugh Byrne (FG) | Jim Tunney (FF) | Richard Gogan (FF) | David Thornley (Lab) | 4 seats from 1969 to 1977 |
| 21st | 1977 | Constituency abolished. See Dublin Finglas and Dublin Cabra | | | | |

| Dáil | Election | Deputy (Party) | Deputy (Party) | Deputy (Party) | Deputy (Party) |
|---|---|---|---|---|---|
| 22nd | 1981 | Jim Tunney (FF) | Michael Barrett (FF) | Mary Flaherty (FG) | Hugh Byrne (FG) |
| 23rd | 1982 (Feb) | Jim Tunney (FF) | Michael Barrett (FF) | Mary Flaherty (FG) | Proinsias De Rossa (WP) |
| 24th | 1982 (Nov) | Jim Tunney (FF) | Michael Barrett (FF) | Mary Flaherty (FG) | Proinsias De Rossa (WP) |
| 25th | 1987 | Jim Tunney (FF) | Michael Barrett (FF) | Mary Flaherty (FG) | Proinsias De Rossa (WP) |
| 26th | 1989 | Jim Tunney (FF) | Michael Barrett (FF) | Mary Flaherty (FG) | Proinsias De Rossa (WP) |
| 27th | 1992 | Noel Ahern (FF) | Róisín Shortall (Lab) | Mary Flaherty (FG) | Proinsias De Rossa (DL) |
| 28th | 1997 | Noel Ahern (FF) | Róisín Shortall (Lab) | Pat Carey (FF) | Proinsias De Rossa (DL) |
| 29th | 2002 | Noel Ahern (FF) | Róisín Shortall (Lab) | Pat Carey (FF) | 3 seats from 2002 |
| 30th | 2007 | Noel Ahern (FF) | Róisín Shortall (Lab) | Pat Carey (FF) | 3 seats from 2002 |
| 31st | 2011 | Dessie Ellis (SF) | Róisín Shortall (Lab) | John Lyons (Lab) | 3 seats from 2002 |
| 32nd | 2016 | Dessie Ellis (SF) | Róisín Shortall (SD) | Noel Rock (FG) | 3 seats from 2002 |
| 33rd | 2020 | Dessie Ellis (SF) | Róisín Shortall (SD) | Paul McAuliffe (FF) | 3 seats from 2002 |
| 34th | 2024 | Dessie Ellis (SF) | Rory Hearne (SD) | Paul McAuliffe (FF) | 3 seats from 2002 |
