= John Curran (Irish politician) =

Irish politician (born 1960)

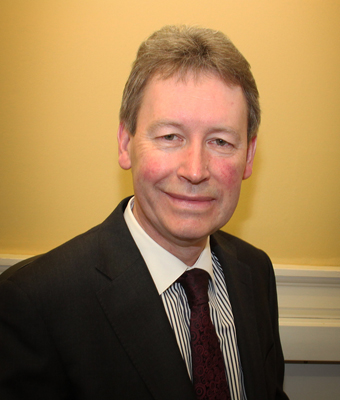
- Curran in 2016

Chair of the Committee on Housing and Homelessness
- In office 4 April 2016 – 10 February 2020
- Preceded by: New office
- Succeeded by: Office abolished

Minister of State
- 2010–2011: Government Chief Whip
- 2010–2011: Defence
- 2009–2010: Education and Science
- 2009–2010: Justice, Equality and Law Reform
- 2008–2010: Community, Rural and Gaeltacht Affairs

Teachta Dála
- In office February 2016 – February 2020
- In office May 2002 – February 2011
- Constituency: Dublin Mid-West

Personal details
- Born: 17 June 1960 (age 66) Lucan, Dublin, Ireland
- Party: Fianna Fáil
- Education: University College Dublin

John Curran (born 17 June 1960) is an Irish former Fianna Fáil politician who served as Chair of the Committee on Housing and Homelessness from 2016 to 2020 and a Minister of State from 2008 to 2011. He served as a Teachta Dála (TD) for the Dublin Mid-West constituency from 2002 to 2011 and 2016 to 2020.

Following his re-election in 2016, he chaired the all-party Oireachtas Housing and Homelessness Committee. This committee launched their final report on 17 June 2016.

Curran was elected to South Dublin County Council at the 1999 local elections representing the Clondalkin–Newcastle local electoral area. He was first elected to Dáil Éireann at the 2002 general election when the constituency was first created. He was re-elected on the first count at the 2007 general election.

On 13 May 2008, shortly after Brian Cowen became Taoiseach, he was appointed as Minister of State at the Department of Community, Rural and Gaeltacht Affairs with special responsibility for the National Drugs Strategy and Community Affairs. On 22 April 2009, he was reassigned within the same department, and also as Minister of State at the Department of Education and Science and at the Department of Justice, Equality and Law Reform, with responsibility for integration policy.

On 23 March 2010 he was appointed as Minister of State at the Department of the Taoiseach with responsibility as Government Chief Whip and Minister of State at the Department of Defence.

He lost his seat at the 2011 general election, but regained it in the 2016 general election. He then chaired the All-Party Oireachtas Social Protection Committee. He lost his seat again at the 2020 general election.

In December 2022, he was named as one of the members of the Electoral Commission which is due to be established in early 2023.

Political offices
Preceded by Pat Carey; Conor Lenihan	Minister of State at the Department of Community, Rural and Gaeltacht Affairs; 2008–2010; With: Conor Lenihan (2008–2009)	Succeeded by Mary White as Minister of State at the Department of Community, Equality and Gaeltacht Affairs
Preceded by Jimmy Devins; Seán Haughey; Conor Lenihan; John Moloney (Irish politician)	Minister of State at the Department of Education and Science; 2009–2010; With: Seán Haughey; Conor Lenihan; John Moloney	Succeeded by Seán Haughey; Conor Lenihan; John Moloney; Mary White as Ministers of State at the Department of Education and Skills
Preceded by Conor Lenihan; John Moloney	Minister of State at the Department of Justice, Equality and Law Reform; 2009–2010; With: John Moloney	Succeeded by John Moloney; Mary White as Ministers of State at the Department of Justice and Law Reform
Preceded by Pat Carey	Government Chief Whip; 2010–2011	Succeeded by Paul Kehoe
Preceded by Pat Carey	Minister of State at the Department of Defence; 2010–2011	Succeeded by Paul Kehoe

Dáil	Election	Deputy (Party)	Deputy (Party)	Deputy (Party)	Deputy (Party)	Deputy (Party)
29th	2002	Paul Gogarty (GP)	3 seats 2002–2007	Mary Harney (PDs)	John Curran (FF)	4 seats 2002–2024
30th	2007	Paul Gogarty (GP)	Joanna Tuffy (Lab)	Mary Harney (PDs)	John Curran (FF)	4 seats 2002–2024
31st	2011	Robert Dowds (Lab)	Joanna Tuffy (Lab)	Frances Fitzgerald (FG)	Derek Keating (FG)	4 seats 2002–2024
32nd	2016	Gino Kenny (AAA–PBP)	Eoin Ó Broin (SF)	Frances Fitzgerald (FG)	John Curran (FF)	4 seats 2002–2024
32nd	2019 by-election	Gino Kenny (AAA–PBP)	Eoin Ó Broin (SF)	Mark Ward (SF)	John Curran (FF)	4 seats 2002–2024
33rd	2020	Gino Kenny (S–PBP)	Eoin Ó Broin (SF)	Mark Ward (SF)	Emer Higgins (FG)	4 seats 2002–2024
34th	2024	Paul Gogarty (Ind.)	Eoin Ó Broin (SF)	Mark Ward (SF)	Emer Higgins (FG)	Shane Moynihan (FF)
