= 2019 Dublin Mid-West by-election =

By-election to the 32nd Dáil

- 29 November 2019
- Turnout: 19,447 (26.6%)
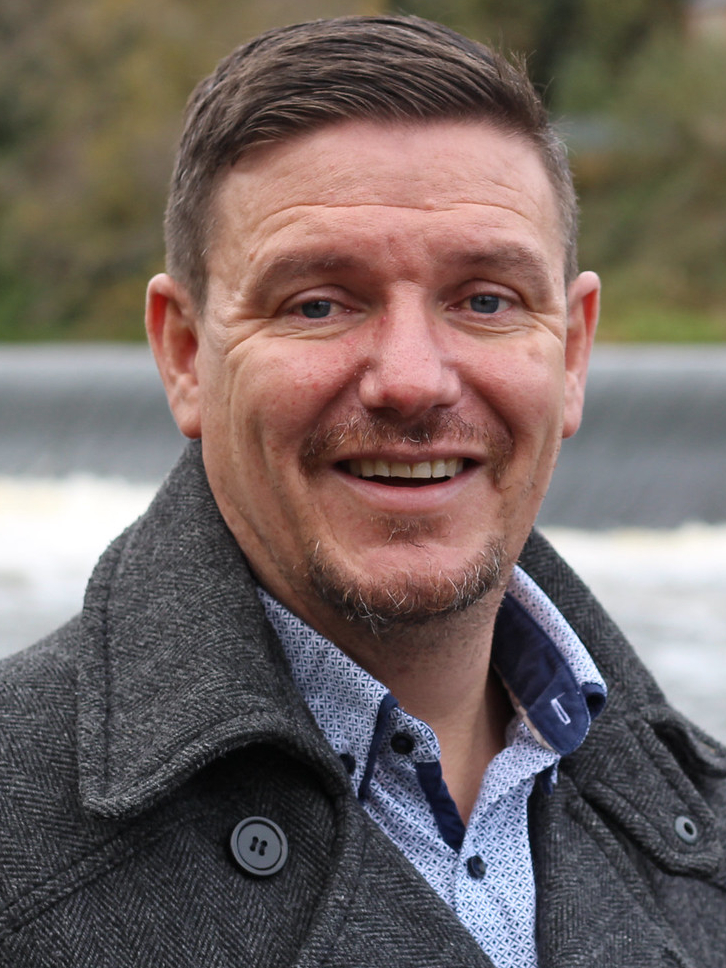

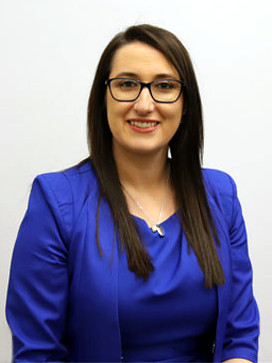

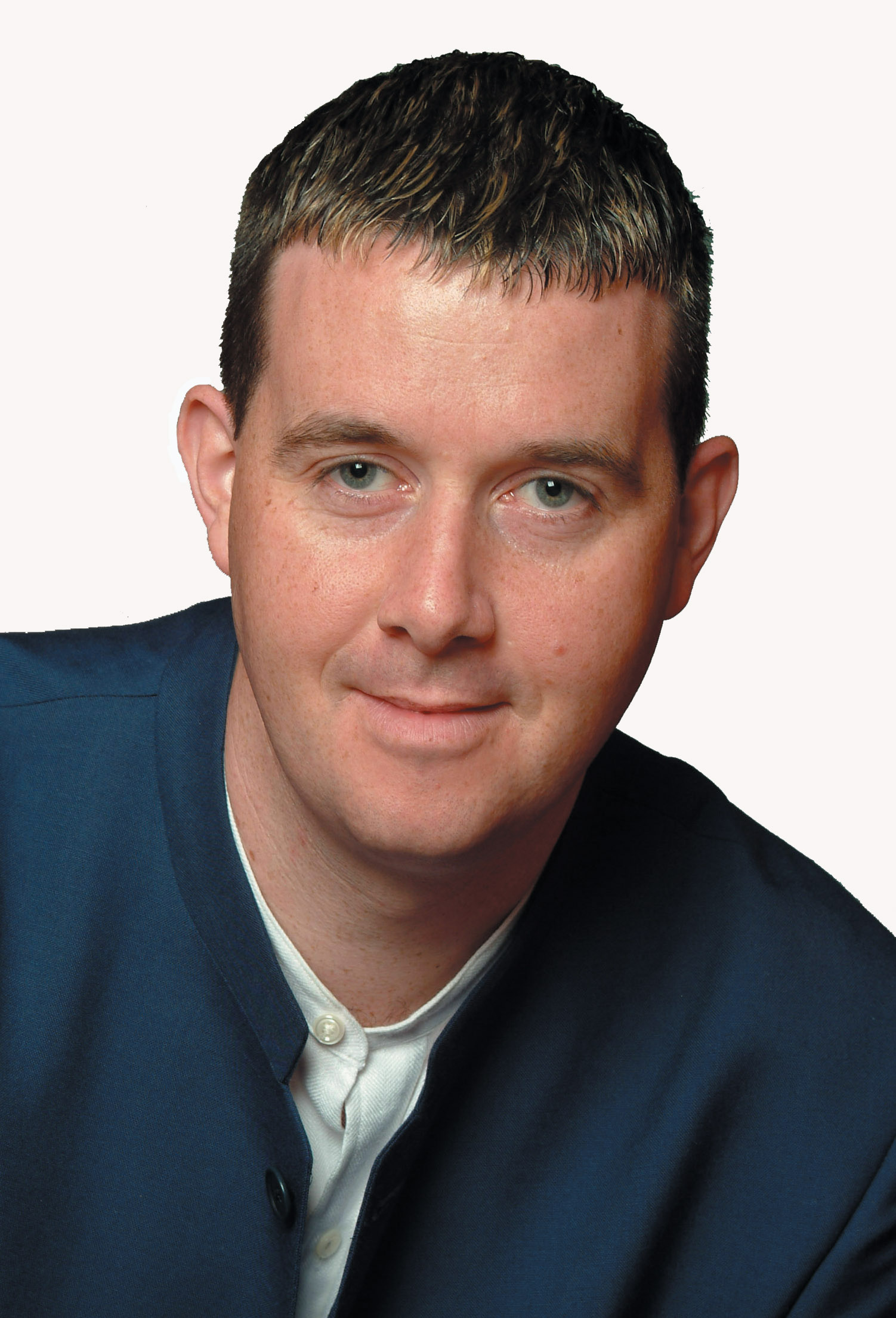
Nominee	Mark Ward	Emer Higgins	Paul Gogarty
Party	Sinn Féin	Fine Gael	Independent
First preferences	4,622	3,576	2,435
Percentage	24.0%	18.6%	12.7%
Final count	7,669	7,144	-
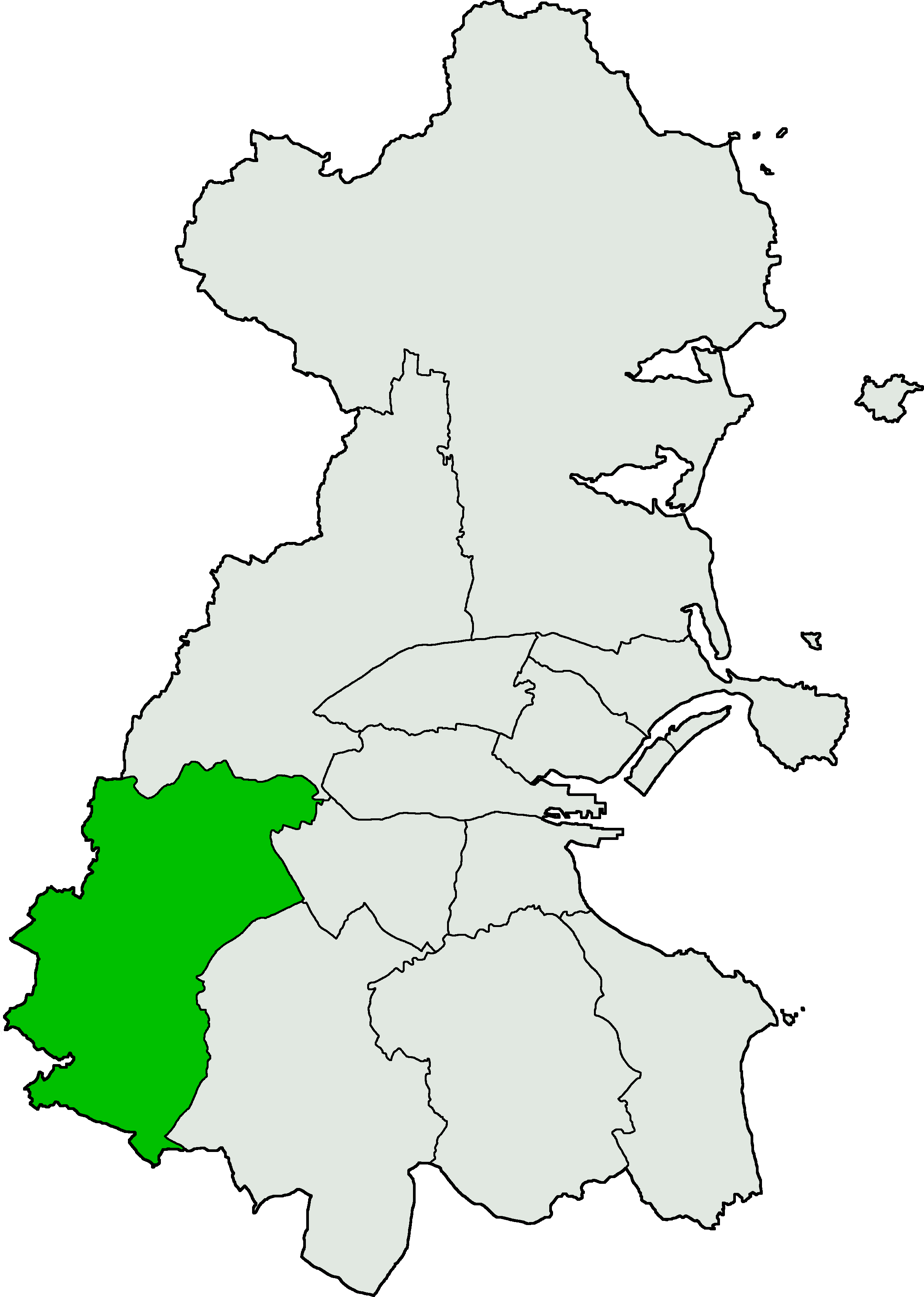
- Dublin Mid-West shown within County Dublin
TD before election
Frances Fitzgerald
Fine Gael
TD after election
Mark Ward
Sinn Féin

A Dáil by-election was held in the constituency of Dublin Mid-West in Ireland on Friday, 29 November 2019, to fill a vacancy in the 32nd Dáil. It followed the election of Fine Gael Teachta Dála (TD) Frances Fitzgerald to the European Parliament.

It was held on the same day as three other by-elections in Cork North-Central, Dublin Fingal and Wexford. The Electoral (Amendment) Act 2011 stipulates that a by-election in Ireland must be held within six months of a vacancy occurring. The by-election writ was moved in the Dáil on 7 November 2019.

At the 2016 general election, the electorate of Dublin Mid-West was 69,388, and the constituency elected one Sinn Féin TD, one Fine Gael TD, one Fianna Fáil TD, and one AAA–PBP TD.

The by-election was won by Sinn Féin candidate Mark Ward, a member of South Dublin County Council.

Among the candidates were seven South Dublin County Councillors; Paul Gogarty, Emer Higgins, Peter Kavanagh, Shane Moynihan, Francis Timmons, Joanna Tuffy and Mark Ward and former South Dublin County Councillor Ruth Nolan.

This was the first occasion when by-elections were contested by Independents 4 Change (who also contested Dublin Fingal) and the Social Democrats (who also contested Cork North-Central and Dublin Fingal).

== Result ==
2019 Dublin Mid-West by-election
Party	Candidate	FPv%	Count								
Party	Candidate	FPv%	1	2	3	4	5	6	7	8	9
Sinn Féin	Mark Ward	24.0	4,622	4,729	4,812	5,228	5,426	5,616	6,293	6,652	7,669
Fine Gael	Emer Higgins	18.6	3,576	3,603	3,703	3,748	3,959	4,362	4,583	5,287	7,144
Independent	Paul Gogarty	12.7	2,435	2,557	2,680	2,840	3,176	3,731	4,099	5,063	
Fianna Fáil	Shane Moynihan	11.8	2,264	2,304	2,360	2,394	2,564	2,758	2,894		
Independent	Francis Timmons	6.8	1,299	1,365	1,410	1,590	1,807	1,929			
Labour	Joanna Tuffy	6.7	1,294	1,333	1,442	1,547	1,775				
Green	Peter Kavanagh	6.4	1,222	1,268	1,393	1,544					
Solidarity–PBP	Kellie Sweeney	5.1	983	1,138	1,281						
Social Democrats	Anne-Marie McNally	4.1	788	845							
Workers' Party	David Gardiner	1.6	317								
Inds. 4 Change	Ruth Nolan	1.4	271								
Independent	Charlie Keddy	0.5	95								
Independent	Peter Madden	0.4	71								
Electorate: 73,152 Valid: 19,237 Spoilt: 210 (0.3%) Quota: 9,619 Turnout: 19,447 (26.6%)
