= Joanna Tuffy =

Irish Labour Party politician (b. 1965)

Cllr Joanna Tuffy
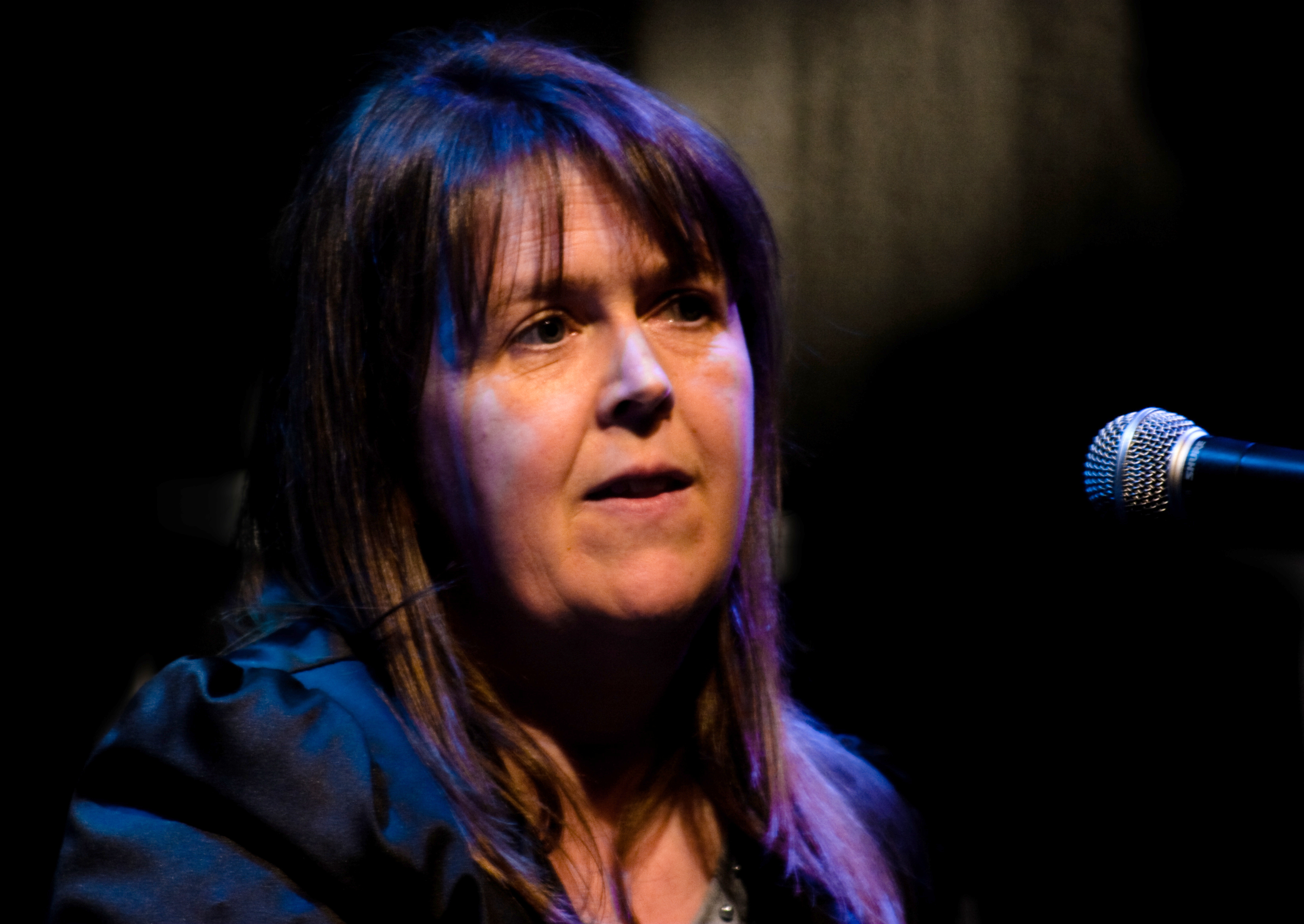

South Dublin County Councillor
- Incumbent
- Assumed office June 2019
- Constituency: South Dublin County Council

Teachta Dála
- In office May 2007 – February 2016
- Constituency: Dublin Mid-West

Senator
- In office September 2002 – May 2007
- Constituency: Administrative Panel

Personal details
- Born: 9 March 1965 (age 61) London, United Kingdom
- Party: Labour Party
- Domestic partner: Philip Long (died 2017)
- Education: Trinity College Dublin; Dublin Institute of Technology

Joanna Tuffy (born 9 March 1965) is an Irish Labour Party politician who served as a Teachta Dála (TD) for the Dublin Mid-West constituency from 2007 to 2016. She was a Senator for the Administrative Panel from 2002 to 2007.

== Early life ==
Born in London in 1965, Tuffy was educated at Trinity College Dublin (BA) and the Dublin Institute of Technology (Legal Studies).

== Political career ==
She was elected to South Dublin County Council for the Lucan area in 1999 and served until 2003. At the 2002 general election she unsuccessfully stood for election to Dáil Éireann for Dublin Mid-West. She was subsequently elected to the 22nd Seanad Éireann by the Administrative Panel. She was elected to Dáil Éireann for the first time at the 2007 general election.

Her father is Eamon Tuffy, a former Labour Party councillor for Lucan. He was co-opted to replace her in 2003.

Tuffy, along with TD Tommy Broughan, opposed Labour going into coalition with Fine Gael in the aftermath of the 2011 general election.

In September 2013, Tuffy publicly disagreed with the official Labour Party position supporting the abolition of the Seanad during the referendum campaign. She argued that it had played a key role in the past and could do so in the future.

Tuffy lost her seat at the 2016 general election.

She was re-elected to South Dublin County Council in the 2019 local elections. She contested the 2019 Dublin Mid-West by-election, when she gained 6.7% of the first preference votes but was not elected. She was also an unsuccessful candidate for Dublin Mid-West at the 2020 general election, when her share of first preference votes fell to only 3.39%. She was re-elected to South Dublin County Council at the 2024 Local Elections.

Dáil	Election	Deputy (Party)	Deputy (Party)	Deputy (Party)	Deputy (Party)	Deputy (Party)
29th	2002	Paul Gogarty (GP)	3 seats 2002–2007	Mary Harney (PDs)	John Curran (FF)	4 seats 2002–2024
30th	2007	Paul Gogarty (GP)	Joanna Tuffy (Lab)	Mary Harney (PDs)	John Curran (FF)	4 seats 2002–2024
31st	2011	Robert Dowds (Lab)	Joanna Tuffy (Lab)	Frances Fitzgerald (FG)	Derek Keating (FG)	4 seats 2002–2024
32nd	2016	Gino Kenny (AAA–PBP)	Eoin Ó Broin (SF)	Frances Fitzgerald (FG)	John Curran (FF)	4 seats 2002–2024
32nd	2019 by-election	Gino Kenny (AAA–PBP)	Eoin Ó Broin (SF)	Mark Ward (SF)	John Curran (FF)	4 seats 2002–2024
33rd	2020	Gino Kenny (S–PBP)	Eoin Ó Broin (SF)	Mark Ward (SF)	Emer Higgins (FG)	4 seats 2002–2024
34th	2024	Paul Gogarty (Ind.)	Eoin Ó Broin (SF)	Mark Ward (SF)	Emer Higgins (FG)	Shane Moynihan (FF)
