= Dublin Mid-West =

Dáil constituency (2002–present)

- Dáil constituency
- Location of Dublin Mid-West within County Dublin
- Interactive map of constituency boundaries since the 2024 general election
- Major settlements: Clondalkin; Lucan; Palmerstown; Rathcoole; Saggart

Current constituency
- Created: 2002
- Seats: 3 (2002–2007); 4 (2007–2024); 5 (2024–)
- TDs: Paul Gogarty (Ind); Emer Higgins (FG); Shane Moynihan (FF); Eoin Ó Broin (SF); Mark Ward (SF)
- Local government area: South Dublin
- Created from: Dublin South-West; Dublin West
- EP constituency: Dublin

Dublin Mid-West is a parliamentary constituency represented in Dáil Éireann, the lower house of the Irish parliament or Oireachtas. The constituency elects five deputies (Teachtaí Dála, commonly known as TDs) on the system of proportional representation by means of the single transferable vote (PR-STV).

== History and boundaries ==
Dublin Mid-West contains the areas of Clondalkin, Lucan, Palmerstown, Rathcoole, Newcastle and Saggart. The constituency was created by the Electoral (Amendment) (No. 2) Act 1998 as a three-seat constituency, composed of areas which had previously been in the constituencies of Dublin South-West and Dublin West, and came into operation at the 2002 general election. Under the Electoral (Amendment) Act 2005, the town of Palmerstown was incorporated into Dublin Mid-West (having been in Dublin West), with an increase to 4 seats, taking effect at the 2007 general election. It has retained these boundaries since 2007.

The Constituency Review Report 2023 of the Electoral Commission recommended that at the next general election Dublin Mid-West become a five-seat constituency, with transfers of territory from Dublin South-West and Dublin South-Central.

The Electoral (Amendment) Act 2023 defines the constituency as:

In the county of South Dublin, the electoral divisions of:

Clondalkin-Cappaghmore, Clondalkin-Dunawley, Clondalkin-Monastery, Clondalkin-Moorfield, Clondalkin-Rowlagh, Clondalkin Village, Lucan-Esker, Lucan Heights, Lucan-St. Helens, Newcastle, Palmerston Village, Palmerston West, Rathcoole, Saggart, Tallaght-Fettercairn.

Changes to the Dublin Mid-West constituency
| Years | TDs | Boundaries | Notes |
|---|---|---|---|
| 2002–2007 | 3 | In the county of South Dublin the electoral divisions of Clondalkin-Cappaghmore, Clondalkin-Dunawley, Clondalkin-Moorfield, Clondalkin-Rowlagh, Clondalkin Village, Lucan-Esker, Lucan Heights, Lucan-St. Helens, Newcastle, Rathcoole, Saggart; and that part of the electoral division of Clondalkin-Monastery situated west of a line drawn along the M50 Western Parkway. | Created from Dublin South-West and Dublin West. |
| 2007– | 4 | In the county of South Dublin the electoral divisions of Clondalkin-Cappaghmore, Clondalkin-Dunawley, Clondalkin-Moorfield, Clondalkin-Rowlagh, Clondalkin Village, Lucan-Esker, Lucan Heights, Lucan-St. Helens, Newcastle, Palmerston Village, Palmerston West, Rathcoole, Saggart; and that part of the electoral division of Clondalkin-Monastery situated west of a line drawn along the M50 Western Parkway. | Territory added from Dublin South-West. |

== TDs ==
Teachtaí Dála (TDs) for Dublin Mid-West 2002–
Key to parties: AAA–PBP = AAA–PBP; FF = Fianna Fáil; FG = Fine Gael; GP = Green; Ind. = Independent; Lab = Labour; PDs = Progressive Democrats; SF = Sinn Féin; S–PBP = Solidarity–PBP
| Dáil | Election | Deputy (Party) | Deputy (Party) | Deputy (Party) | Deputy (Party) | Deputy (Party) |
| 29th | 2002 | Paul Gogarty (GP) | 3 seats 2002–2007 | Mary Harney (PDs) | John Curran (FF) | 4 seats 2002–2024 |
| 30th | 2007 | Paul Gogarty (GP) | Joanna Tuffy (Lab) | Mary Harney (PDs) | John Curran (FF) | 4 seats 2002–2024 |
| 31st | 2011 | Robert Dowds (Lab) | Joanna Tuffy (Lab) | Frances Fitzgerald (FG) | Derek Keating (FG) | 4 seats 2002–2024 |
| 32nd | 2016 | Gino Kenny (AAA–PBP) | Eoin Ó Broin (SF) | Frances Fitzgerald (FG) | John Curran (FF) | 4 seats 2002–2024 |
| 32nd | 2019 by-election | Gino Kenny (AAA–PBP) | Eoin Ó Broin (SF) | Mark Ward (SF) | John Curran (FF) | 4 seats 2002–2024 |
| 33rd | 2020 | Gino Kenny (S–PBP) | Eoin Ó Broin (SF) | Mark Ward (SF) | Emer Higgins (FG) | 4 seats 2002–2024 |
| 34th | 2024 | Paul Gogarty (Ind.) | Eoin Ó Broin (SF) | Mark Ward (SF) | Emer Higgins (FG) | Shane Moynihan (FF) |

Note: The columns in this table are used only for presentational purposes, and no significance should be attached to the order of columns. For details of the order in which seats were won at each election, see the detailed results of that election.

== Elections ==
*: Outgoing TD

=== 2024 general election ===
2024 general election: Dublin Mid-West
| Party | Candidate | FPv% | Count | | | | | | | | | | | | |
| Party | Candidate | FPv% | 1 | 2 | 3 | 4 | 5 | 6 | 7 | 8 | 9 | 10 | 11 | 12 | 13 |
|---|---|---|---|---|---|---|---|---|---|---|---|---|---|---|---|
| Sinn Féin | Eoin Ó Broin (Note: The outgoing Sinn Féin TD and the Social Democrats councillor are both named Eoin Ó Broin.) | 20.8 | 9,892 | | | | | | | | | | | | |
| Sinn Féin | Mark Ward | 11.2 | 5,323 | 6,817 | 6,853 | 6,871 | 6,893 | 6,976 | 7,171 | 7,517 | 7,923 | | | | |
| Fine Gael | Emer Higgins | 10.1 | 4,798 | 4,817 | 4,820 | 4,884 | 5,036 | 5,101 | 5,154 | 5,175 | 5,506 | 5,630 | 5,809 | 8,580 | |
| Fianna Fáil | Shane Moynihan | 10.0 | 4,746 | 4,767 | 4,775 | 4,822 | 5,276 | 5,431 | 5,549 | 5,574 | 5,803 | 5,944 | 6,203 | 6,791 | 7,231 |
| Fine Gael | Vicki Casserly | 7.9 | 3,723 | 3,740 | 3,750 | 3,822 | 3,893 | 3,951 | 4,000 | 4,021 | 4,190 | 4,301 | 4,442 | | |
| Independent | Paul Gogarty | 7.7 | 3,646 | 3,683 | 3,739 | 3,837 | 3,851 | 4,076 | 4,245 | 4,448 | 4,682 | 5,130 | 6,274 | 6,940 | 7,106 |
| Social Democrats | Eoin Ó Broin | 6.1 | 2,907 | 3,017 | 3,025 | 3,151 | 3,184 | 3,255 | 3,339 | 3,382 | 4,051 | 5,638 | 6,006 | 6,154 | 6,215 |
| PBP–Solidarity | Gino Kenny (Note: Kenny is a member of People Before Profit.) | 5.5 | 2,608 | 2,730 | 2,748 | 2,783 | 2,801 | 2,863 | 2,943 | 3,030 | 3,359 | | | | |
| Labour | Francis Timmons | 4.8 | 2,270 | 2,322 | 2,345 | 2,451 | 2,500 | 2,552 | 2,625 | 2,698 | | | | | |
| Independent Ireland | Linda de Courcy | 3.9 | 1,823 | 1,846 | 1,968 | 1,984 | 2,007 | 2,048 | 2,416 | 3,279 | 3,427 | 3,691 | | | |
| Aontú | Colm Quinn | 3.1 | 1,492 | 1,527 | 1,552 | 1,561 | 1,569 | 1,601 | | | | | | | |
| Irish Freedom | Glen Moore | 3.0 | 1,435 | 1,448 | 1,566 | 1,573 | 1,575 | 1,605 | 1,935 | | | | | | |
| Independent | Alan Hayes | 1.8 | 855 | 865 | 899 | 920 | 923 | | | | | | | | |
| Fianna Fáil | Lynda Prendergast | 1.8 | 850 | 858 | 858 | 879 | | | | | | | | | |
| Green | Karla Doran | 1.3 | 637 | 643 | 650 | | | | | | | | | | |
| The Irish People | Robert Coyle | 0.7 | 348 | 356 | | | | | | | | | | | |
| Independent | Seanán Ó Coistín | 0.3 | 123 | 127 | | | | | | | | | | | |
Electorate: 85,769 Valid: 47,476 Spoilt: 454 Quota: 7,913 Turnout: 55.9%

=== 2020 general election ===
2020 general election: Dublin Mid-West
| Party | Candidate | FPv% | Count | | | | | | | | |
| Party | Candidate | FPv% | 1 | 2 | 3 | 4 | 5 | 6 | 7 | 8 | 9 |
|---|---|---|---|---|---|---|---|---|---|---|---|
| Sinn Féin | Eoin Ó Broin | 26.1 | 11,842 | | | | | | | | |
| Sinn Féin | Mark Ward | 16.7 | 7,621 | 9,808 | | | | | | | |
| Fianna Fáil | John Curran | 10.8 | 4,931 | 4,980 | 4,997 | 5,449 | 5,555 | 5,704 | 6,049 | 6,454 | 7,383 |
| Fine Gael | Emer Higgins | 9.9 | 4,487 | 4,514 | 4,526 | 4,571 | 4,651 | 4,879 | 5,370 | 8,230 | 9,735 |
| Solidarity–PBP | Gino Kenny (Note: Kenny was a member of People Before Profit.) | 7.9 | 3,572 | 3,819 | 4,228 | 4,416 | 4,871 | 5,115 | 6,153 | 6,302 | 8,089 |
| Fine Gael | Vicki Casserly | 7.7 | 3,501 | 3,518 | 3,529 | 3,582 | 3,616 | 3,835 | 4,208 | | |
| Independent | Paul Gogarty | 6.5 | 2,950 | 2,994 | 3,049 | 3,186 | 3,427 | 3,784 | 4,836 | 5,412 | |
| Green | Peter Kavanagh | 6.1 | 2,785 | 2,855 | 2,924 | 3,031 | 3,229 | 3,669 | | | |
| Labour | Joanna Tuffy | 3.4 | 1,541 | 1,573 | 1,599 | 1,679 | 1,751 | | | | |
| Independent | Francis Timmons | 2.4 | 1,103 | 1,160 | 1,238 | 1,299 | | | | | |
| Fianna Fáil | Catriona McClean | 1.5 | 667 | 674 | 677 | | | | | | |
| Workers' Party | David Gardiner | 1.0 | 452 | 466 | 503 | | | | | | |
Electorate: 74,506 Valid: 45,452 Spoilt: 480 (1.0%) Quota: 9,091 Turnout: 45,932 (61.5%)

=== 2019 by-election ===
A by-election was held in the constituency on 29 November 2019 to fill the seat vacated by Frances Fitzgerald on her election to the European Parliament in May 2019.

2019 by-election: Dublin Mid-West
| Party | Candidate | FPv% | Count | | | | | | | | |
| Party | Candidate | FPv% | 1 | 2 | 3 | 4 | 5 | 6 | 7 | 8 | 9 |
|---|---|---|---|---|---|---|---|---|---|---|---|
| Sinn Féin | Mark Ward | 24.0 | 4,622 | 4,729 | 4,812 | 5,228 | 5,426 | 5,616 | 6,293 | 6,652 | 7,669 |
| Fine Gael | Emer Higgins | 18.6 | 3,576 | 3,603 | 3,703 | 3,748 | 3,959 | 4,362 | 4,583 | 5,287 | 7,144 |
| Independent | Paul Gogarty | 12.7 | 2,435 | 2,557 | 2,680 | 2,840 | 3,176 | 3,731 | 4,099 | 5,063 | |
| Fianna Fáil | Shane Moynihan | 11.8 | 2,264 | 2,304 | 2,360 | 2,394 | 2,564 | 2,758 | 2,894 | | |
| Independent | Francis Timmons | 6.8 | 1,299 | 1,365 | 1,442 | 1,590 | 1,807 | 1,929 | | | |
| Labour | Joanna Tuffy | 6.7 | 1,294 | 1,333 | 1,442 | 1,547 | 1,775 | | | | |
| Green | Peter Kavanagh | 6.4 | 1,222 | 1,268 | 1,393 | 1,544 | | | | | |
| Solidarity–PBP | Kellie Sweeney | 5.1 | 983 | 1,138 | 1,281 | | | | | | |
| Social Democrats | Anne-Marie McNally | 4.1 | 788 | 845 | | | | | | | |
| Workers' Party | David Gardiner | 1.6 | 317 | | | | | | | | |
| Inds. 4 Change | Ruth Nolan | 1.4 | 271 | | | | | | | | |
| Independent | Charlie Keddy | 0.5 | 95 | | | | | | | | |
| Independent | Peter Madden | 0.4 | 71 | | | | | | | | |
Electorate: 73,152 Valid: 19,237 Spoilt: 210 (0.3%) Quota: 9,619 Turnout: 19,447 (26.6%)

=== 2016 general election ===
2016 general election: Dublin Mid-West
| Party | Candidate | FPv% | Count | | | | | | | | | | | |
| Party | Candidate | FPv% | 1 | 2 | 3 | 4 | 5 | 6 | 7 | 8 | 9 | 10 | 11 | 12 |
|---|---|---|---|---|---|---|---|---|---|---|---|---|---|---|
| Sinn Féin | Eoin Ó Broin | 22.7 | 9,782 | | | | | | | | | | | |
| Fine Gael | Frances Fitzgerald | 20.9 | 9,028 | | | | | | | | | | | |
| Fianna Fáil | John Curran | 16.2 | 6,971 | 7,054 | 7,109 | 7,114 | 7,145 | 7,180 | 7,218 | 7,274 | 7,383 | 7,685 | 8,287 | 9,497 |
| AAA–PBP | Gino Kenny | 10.7 | 4,629 | 5,257 | 5,270 | 5,321 | 5,331 | 5,397 | 5,474 | 5,791 | 6,331 | 6,542 | 7,498 | 7,911 |
| Social Democrats | Anne-Marie McNally | 6.1 | 2,633 | 2,730 | 2,747 | 2,766 | 2,773 | 2,804 | 2,867 | 3,048 | 3,235 | 3,679 | 4,460 | 5,320 |
| Independent | Paul Gogarty | 5.9 | 2,522 | 2,593 | 2,623 | 2,646 | 2,658 | 2,700 | 2,741 | 2,863 | 3,164 | 3,505 | | |
| Fine Gael | Derek Keating | 5.4 | 2,337 | 2,356 | 2,549 | 2,559 | 2,603 | 2,636 | 2,653 | 2,696 | 2,725 | 3,640 | 4,179 | |
| Labour | Joanna Tuffy | 5.0 | 2,146 | 2,175 | 2,252 | 2,259 | 2,311 | 2,342 | 2,355 | 2,475 | 2,515 | | | |
| Independent | Francis Timmons | 2.5 | 1,085 | 1,195 | 1,200 | 1,210 | 1,214 | 1,233 | 1,318 | 1,422 | | | | |
| Workers' Party | Lorraine Hennessey | 1.2 | 502 | 553 | 555 | 568 | 570 | 584 | 613 | | | | | |
| Green | Tom Kivlehan | 0.9 | 388 | 405 | 410 | 413 | 417 | 430 | 443 | | | | | |
| Independent | Clare Leonard | 0.8 | 358 | 379 | 383 | 398 | 403 | 422 | | | | | | |
| Independent | Patrick Akpoveta | 0.7 | 288 | 307 | 311 | 318 | 343 | | | | | | | |
| Independent | Haroon Khan | 0.6 | 268 | 272 | 273 | 275 | | | | | | | | |
| Direct Democracy | Christopher Healy | 0.4 | 167 | 179 | 180 | | | | | | | | | |
Electorate: 69,388 Valid: 43,104 Spoilt: 446 (1.0%) Quota: 8,621 Turnout: 43,550 (62.8%)

=== 2011 general election ===
2011 general election: Dublin Mid-West
| Party | Candidate | FPv% | Count | | | | | | | | |
| Party | Candidate | FPv% | 1 | 2 | 3 | 4 | 5 | 6 | 7 | 8 | 9 |
|---|---|---|---|---|---|---|---|---|---|---|---|
| Labour | Joanna Tuffy | 17.5 | 7,495 | 7,513 | 7,533 | 7,553 | 7,633 | 7,827 | 8,948 | | |
| Fine Gael | Frances Fitzgerald | 17.0 | 7,281 | 7,285 | 7,303 | 7,323 | 7,424 | 7,493 | 7,903 | 9,213 | |
| Fine Gael | Derek Keating | 13.9 | 5,933 | 5,938 | 5,945 | 5,964 | 5,992 | 6,072 | 6,503 | 7,244 | 7,703 |
| Labour | Robert Dowds | 13.2 | 5,643 | 5,645 | 5,661 | 5,695 | 5,734 | 5,870 | 6,519 | 7,934 | 8,112 |
| Sinn Féin | Eoin Ó Broin | 11.8 | 5,060 | 5,066 | 5,088 | 5,117 | 5,164 | 5,399 | 6,628 | 7,120 | 7,151 |
| Fianna Fáil | John Curran | 11.8 | 5,043 | 5,047 | 5,068 | 5,095 | 5,130 | 5,193 | 5,513 | | |
| People Before Profit | Gino Kenny (Note: Kenny campaigned as a member of the United Left Alliance.) | 5.8 | 2,471 | 2,481 | 2,513 | 2,536 | 2,597 | 3,059 | | | |
| Green | Paul Gogarty | 3.5 | 1,484 | 1,490 | 1,498 | 1,509 | 1,534 | 1,605 | | | |
| Workers' Party | Mick Finnegan | 1.6 | 694 | 700 | 712 | 722 | 735 | | | | |
| Socialist Party | Robert Connolly (Note: Connolly campaigned as a member of the United Left Alliance.) | 1.5 | 622 | 624 | 634 | 637 | 649 | | | | |
| Independent | Michael Ryan | 0.9 | 375 | 397 | 429 | 514 | | | | | |
| Independent | Jim McHale | 0.6 | 255 | 269 | 319 | | | | | | |
| Independent | Colm McGrath | 0.6 | 253 | 264 | | | | | | | |
| Independent | Niall Smith | 0.3 | 113 | | | | | | | | |
Electorate: 64,880 Valid: 42,722 Spoilt: 471 (1.1%) Quota: 8,545 Turnout: 43,193 (66.6%)

=== 2007 general election ===
2007 general election: Dublin Mid-West
| Party | Candidate | FPv% | Count | | | | | |
| Party | Candidate | FPv% | 1 | 2 | 3 | 4 | 5 | 6 |
|---|---|---|---|---|---|---|---|---|
| Fianna Fáil | John Curran | 23.2 | 8,650 | | | | | |
| Progressive Democrats | Mary Harney | 12.5 | 4,663 | 4,956 | 5,066 | 5,454 | 5,668 | 7,786 |
| Fine Gael | Frances Fitzgerald | 12.0 | 4,480 | 4,532 | 4,680 | 4,975 | 5,344 | 5,664 |
| Labour | Joanna Tuffy | 10.9 | 4,075 | 4,145 | 4,440 | 4,895 | 6,004 | 6,672 |
| Green | Paul Gogarty | 10.8 | 4,043 | 4,123 | 4,393 | 5,557 | 6,700 | 7,920 |
| Fianna Fáil | Luke Moriarty | 9.8 | 3,671 | 4,200 | 4,333 | 4,666 | 5,185 | |
| Sinn Féin | Joanne Spain | 9.3 | 3,462 | 3,529 | 3,970 | 4,138 | | |
| Independent | Derek Keating | 7.2 | 2,701 | 2,729 | 2,907 | | | |
| People Before Profit | Gino Kenny | 2.8 | 1,058 | 1,099 | | | | |
| Workers' Party | Mick Finnegan | 1.0 | 366 | 378 | | | | |
| Independent | Jim McHale | 0.5 | 170 | 180 | | | | |
Electorate: 61,347 Valid: 37,339 Spoilt: 319 (0.9%) Quota: 7,468 Turnout: 37,658 (61.4%)

=== 2002 general election ===
2002 general election: Dublin Mid-West
| Party | Candidate | FPv% | Count | | | | | | | | | |
| Party | Candidate | FPv% | 1 | 2 | 3 | 4 | 5 | 6 | 7 | 8 | 9 | 10 |
|---|---|---|---|---|---|---|---|---|---|---|---|---|
| Fianna Fáil | John Curran | 20.7 | 5,904 | 5,928 | 5,979 | 6,112 | 6,292 | 6,508 | 6,909 | 7,086 | 9,350 | |
| Progressive Democrats | Mary Harney | 20.0 | 5,706 | 5,719 | 5,732 | 5,812 | 5,953 | 6,196 | 6,348 | 6,924 | 7,524 | |
| Green | Paul Gogarty | 12.3 | 3,508 | 3,523 | 3,541 | 3,627 | 3,870 | 3,947 | 4,594 | 5,260 | 5,645 | 6,345 |
| Fianna Fáil | Des Kelly | 11.3 | 3,218 | 3,232 | 3,237 | 3,290 | 3,381 | 3,434 | 3,625 | 3,737 | | |
| Labour | Joanna Tuffy | 9.0 | 2,563 | 2,566 | 2,602 | 2,744 | 2,891 | 3,199 | 3,594 | 4,495 | 4,808 | 5,371 |
| Fine Gael | Austin Currie | 7.1 | 2,008 | 2,017 | 2,023 | 2,051 | 2,100 | 2,573 | 2,687 | | | |
| Sinn Féin | Tony Flannery | 6.5 | 1,855 | 1,861 | 1,912 | 2,031 | 2,244 | 2,326 | | | | |
| Fine Gael | Therese Ridge | 4.5 | 1,268 | 1,271 | 1,314 | 1,419 | 1,536 | | | | | |
| Independent | David Green | 3.8 | 1,078 | 1,092 | 1,170 | 1,313 | | | | | | |
| Independent | Colm McGrath | 1.7 | 487 | 488 | 521 | | | | | | | |
| Workers' Party | Andrew McGuinness | 1.4 | 393 | 393 | 407 | | | | | | | |
| Independent | Michael O'Mara | 1.3 | 361 | 362 | | | | | | | | |
| Christian Solidarity | Colm Callanan | 0.4 | 107 | | | | | | | | | |
Electorate: 55,184 Valid: 28,456 Spoilt: 237 (0.8%) Quota: 7,115 Turnout: 28,693 (52.0%)

== See also ==
- Dáil constituencies
- Elections in the Republic of Ireland
- Politics of the Republic of Ireland
- List of Dáil by-elections
- List of political parties in the Republic of Ireland
