= Robert Dowds =

Irish former politician (born 1953)

Teachta Dála
- In office February 2011 – February 2016
- Constituency: Dublin Mid-West

Personal details
- Born: 11 May 1953 (age 73) Dublin, Ireland
- Party: Labour Party
- Spouse: Katherine Dowds (m. 1986)
- Children: 2
- Education: Trinity College Dublin; St Patrick's College, Dublin

Robert Dowds (born 11 May 1953) is an Irish former Labour Party politician who served as a Teachta Dála (TD) for the Dublin Mid-West constituency from 2011 to 2016.

He was a member of South Dublin County Council for the Clondalkin electoral area from 1999 to 2011. He was re-elected at the 2004 local elections, serving as Mayor of South Dublin County Council from 2004 to 2005, and re-elected again at the 2009 local elections.

He did not contest the 2016 general election.

He attempted to get re-elected to South Dublin County Council in 2019, but was unsuccessful by a margin of 39 votes.

A member of the Church of Ireland, he went on scholarship to The King's Hospital private school in Dublin, and was also educated at Trinity College Dublin and St. Patrick's College, Drumcondra.

Dáil	Election	Deputy (Party)	Deputy (Party)	Deputy (Party)	Deputy (Party)	Deputy (Party)
29th	2002	Paul Gogarty (GP)	3 seats 2002–2007	Mary Harney (PDs)	John Curran (FF)	4 seats 2002–2024
30th	2007	Paul Gogarty (GP)	Joanna Tuffy (Lab)	Mary Harney (PDs)	John Curran (FF)	4 seats 2002–2024
31st	2011	Robert Dowds (Lab)	Joanna Tuffy (Lab)	Frances Fitzgerald (FG)	Derek Keating (FG)	4 seats 2002–2024
32nd	2016	Gino Kenny (AAA–PBP)	Eoin Ó Broin (SF)	Frances Fitzgerald (FG)	John Curran (FF)	4 seats 2002–2024
32nd	2019 by-election	Gino Kenny (AAA–PBP)	Eoin Ó Broin (SF)	Mark Ward (SF)	John Curran (FF)	4 seats 2002–2024
33rd	2020	Gino Kenny (S–PBP)	Eoin Ó Broin (SF)	Mark Ward (SF)	Emer Higgins (FG)	4 seats 2002–2024
34th	2024	Paul Gogarty (Ind.)	Eoin Ó Broin (SF)	Mark Ward (SF)	Emer Higgins (FG)	Shane Moynihan (FF)
