= 2019 Cork North-Central by-election =

By-election to the 32nd Dáil

- 29 November 2019
- Turnout: 25,854 (30.2%)
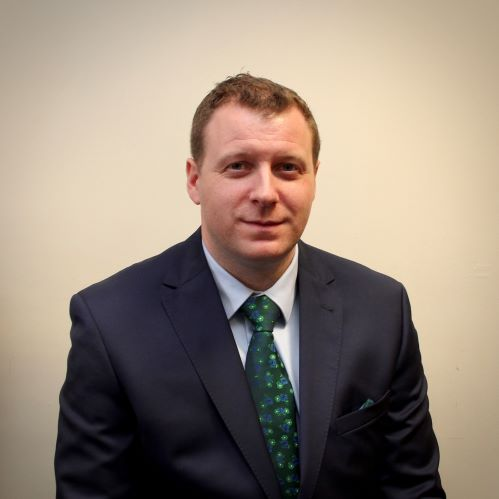

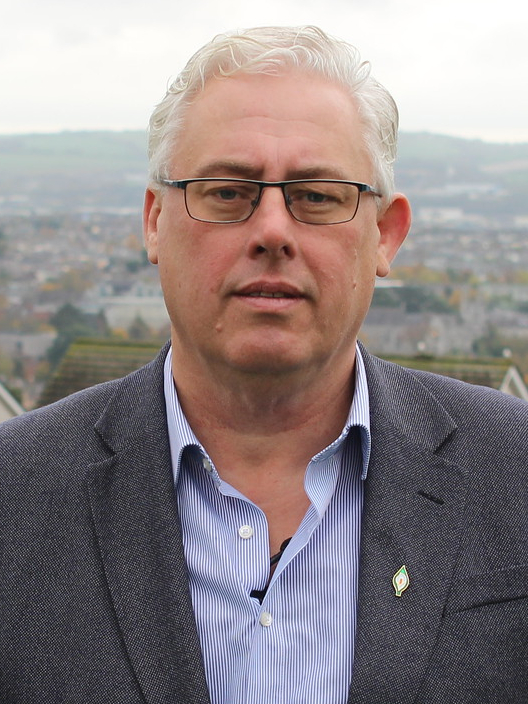

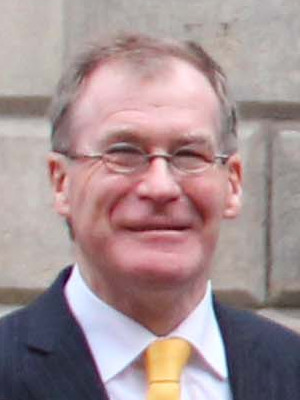
Nominee	Pádraig O'Sullivan	Thomas Gould	Colm Burke
Party	Fianna Fáil	Sinn Féin	Fine Gael
First preferences	7,148	5,041	5,385
Percentage	28.0%	19.7%	21.1%
Final count	11,633	8,044	-
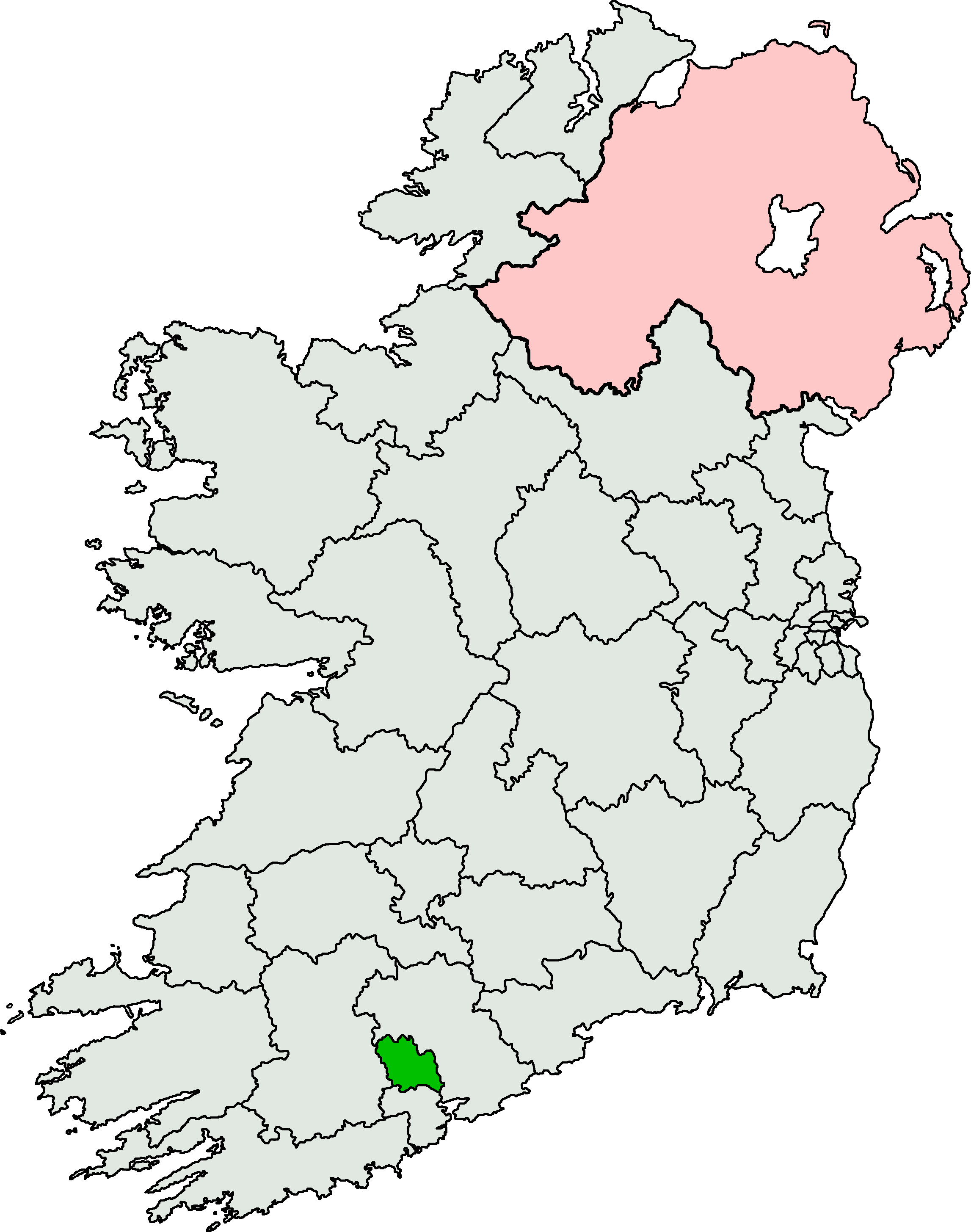
- Cork North-Central shown within Ireland
TD before election
Billy Kelleher
Fianna Fáil
TD after election
Pádraig O'Sullivan
Fianna Fáil

A Dáil by-election was held in the constituency of Cork North-Central on Friday, 29 November 2019, to fill a vacancy in the 32nd Dáil. It followed the election of Fianna Fáil Teachta Dála (TD) Billy Kelleher to the European Parliament.

The by-election was won by the Fianna Fáil candidate Pádraig O'Sullivan, a member of Cork County Council.

Three other by-elections were held on the same day, in Dublin Fingal, Dublin Mid-West, and Wexford. The Electoral (Amendment) Act 204 stipulates that a by-election in Ireland must be held within six months of a vacancy occurring. The by-election writ was moved in the Dáil on 7 November 2019.

At the 2016 general election, the electorate of Cork North-Central was 81,609, and the constituency elected one Fianna Fáil TD, one AAA–PBP TD, one Sinn Féin TD, and one Fine Gael TD. The 2019 electorate was 85,524 (a 4.8% increase).

Among the by-election candidates were Senator and former MEP Colm Burke; four Cork City Councillors (Thomas Gould, John Maher, Oliver Moran and Fiona Ryan); Cork County Councillor Pádraig O'Sullivan; and three unsuccessful candidates at the May 2019 city council election (Sinéad Halpin. Thomas Kiely, and Finian Toomey). This was the first occasion Aontú (also contested Wexford) and the Social Democrats (also contested Dublin Fingal and Dublin Mid-West) contested by-elections.

In mid-November it was reported that Fine Gael's Dara Murphy would be resigning his seat in the same constituency in December, to become deputy chef de cabinet of European Commissioner Mariya Gabriel. The Irish Times reported regret within Fine Gael that Murphy had not resigned sooner, which would have allowed one single transferable vote by-election to fill both vacancies, increasing the likelihood that Fine Gael would have retained a seat.

== Result ==
2019 Cork North-Central by-election
Party	Candidate	FPv%	Count									
Party	Candidate	FPv%	1	2	3	4	5	6	7	8	9	10
Fianna Fáil	Pádraig O'Sullivan	28.0	7,148	7,154	7,177	7,202	7,250	7,451	7,544	7,878	8,657	11,633
Fine Gael	Colm Burke	21.1	5,385	5,386	5,398	5,431	5,469	5,593	5,684	6,118	6,972	
Sinn Féin	Thomas Gould	19.7	5,041	5,042	5,077	5,275	5,368	5,479	5,935	6,184	7,130	8,044
Labour	John Maher	9.7	2,482	2,485	2,501	2,565	2,705	2,750	2,947	3,866		
Green	Oliver Moran	7.4	1,883	1,884	1,898	1,932	2,095	2,195	2,537			
Solidarity	Fiona Ryan	4.4	1,121	1,125	1,155	1,260	1,436	1,534				
Aontú	Finian Toomey	3.9	1,008	1,015	1,042	1,070	1,098					
Social Democrats	Sinéad Halpin	2.5	644	644	652	727						
Independent	Martin Condon	1.1	291	294	347							
Workers' Party	James Coughlan	1.1	281	285	290							
Independent	Thomas Kiely	0.9	234	248								
Independent	Charlie Keddy	0.2	49									
Electorate: 85,524 Valid: 25,567 Spoilt: 287 (1.1%) Quota: 12,784 Turnout: 25,854 (30.2%)

The number of votes to qualify for reimbursement of election expenses was 3,179 (one-quarter of the quota), which was reached by O'Sullivan, Burke, Gould, and Maher.
