= Mark Ward (politician) =

Irish politician

Mark Ward TD
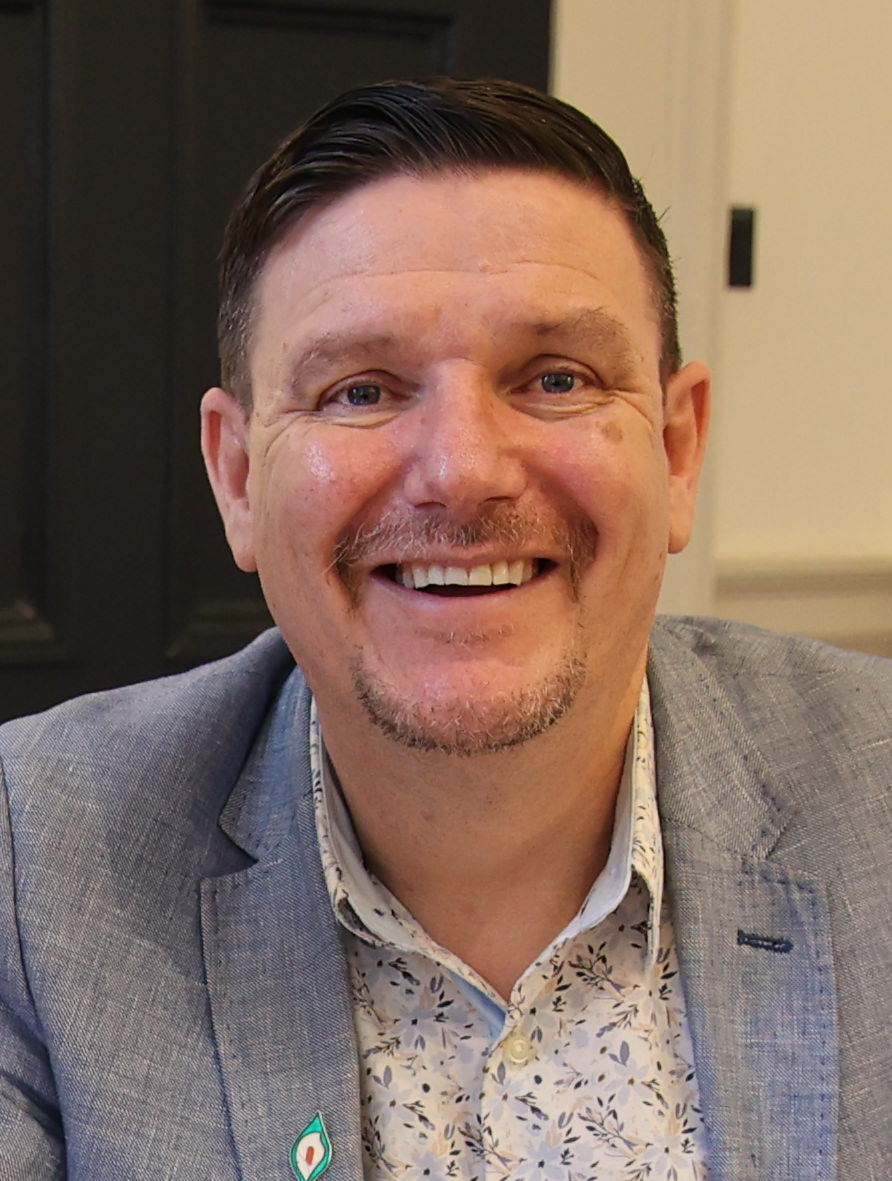
- Ward in 2024

Teachta Dála
- Incumbent
- Assumed office November 2019
- Constituency: Dublin Mid-West

Personal details
- Born: 1974/1975 (age 50–51) Dublin, Ireland
- Party: Sinn Féin
- Children: 3
- Education: NUI Maynooth; University College Dublin; IT Carlow
- Website: sinnfein.ie/mark-ward

Mark Ward (born 1974/1975) is an Irish Sinn Féin politician who has been a Teachta Dála (TD) for the Dublin Mid-West constituency since the 2019 by-election.

== Early life ==
Ward grew up in Harelawn, north Clondalkin and was diagnosed with multiple sclerosis in 2005. He is a qualified behavioural therapist, having diplomas from NUI Maynooth and University College Dublin and a B.A. in Community Development and Addiction Studies from IT Carlow.

== Political career ==
Ward stood as an independent candidate at the 2009 local elections for South Dublin County Council but was not elected. He was co-opted representing Sinn Féin onto South Dublin County Council on 14 March 2016, for the Clondalkin local electoral area. He was elected Mayor of South Dublin in June 2018, serving until June 2019. He was re-elected to the council at the 2019 South Dublin County Council election, this time for the Palmerstown–Fonthill local electoral area. On 30 November 2019, he was elected to Dáil Éireann at the 2019 Dublin Mid-West by-election. Despite predictions that he would lose his seat, he retained it at the 2020 general election, alongside his running mate Eoin O'Broin.

Ward has been Sinn Féin Mental Health Spokesperson since 2020. He was re-elected in the 2024 general election. Despite predictions that he would lose his seat Ward came second after the first count and was the second candidate elected alongside Eoin O'Broin.

== Personal life ==
Ward has three children. He is a fan of Dublin Gaelic footballers, and has a full back tattoo of the Dublin GAA crest. From November 2016 until 2017, he was homeless, and this experience has resulted in him vowing to focus on housing as his main priority in politics.

Dáil	Election	Deputy (Party)	Deputy (Party)	Deputy (Party)	Deputy (Party)	Deputy (Party)
29th	2002	Paul Gogarty (GP)	3 seats 2002–2007	Mary Harney (PDs)	John Curran (FF)	4 seats 2002–2024
30th	2007	Paul Gogarty (GP)	Joanna Tuffy (Lab)	Mary Harney (PDs)	John Curran (FF)	4 seats 2002–2024
31st	2011	Robert Dowds (Lab)	Joanna Tuffy (Lab)	Frances Fitzgerald (FG)	Derek Keating (FG)	4 seats 2002–2024
32nd	2016	Gino Kenny (AAA–PBP)	Eoin Ó Broin (SF)	Frances Fitzgerald (FG)	John Curran (FF)	4 seats 2002–2024
32nd	2019 by-election	Gino Kenny (AAA–PBP)	Eoin Ó Broin (SF)	Mark Ward (SF)	John Curran (FF)	4 seats 2002–2024
33rd	2020	Gino Kenny (S–PBP)	Eoin Ó Broin (SF)	Mark Ward (SF)	Emer Higgins (FG)	4 seats 2002–2024
34th	2024	Paul Gogarty (Ind.)	Eoin Ó Broin (SF)	Mark Ward (SF)	Emer Higgins (FG)	Shane Moynihan (FF)
