= Coláiste Phádraig (Lucan) =

Lucan CBS
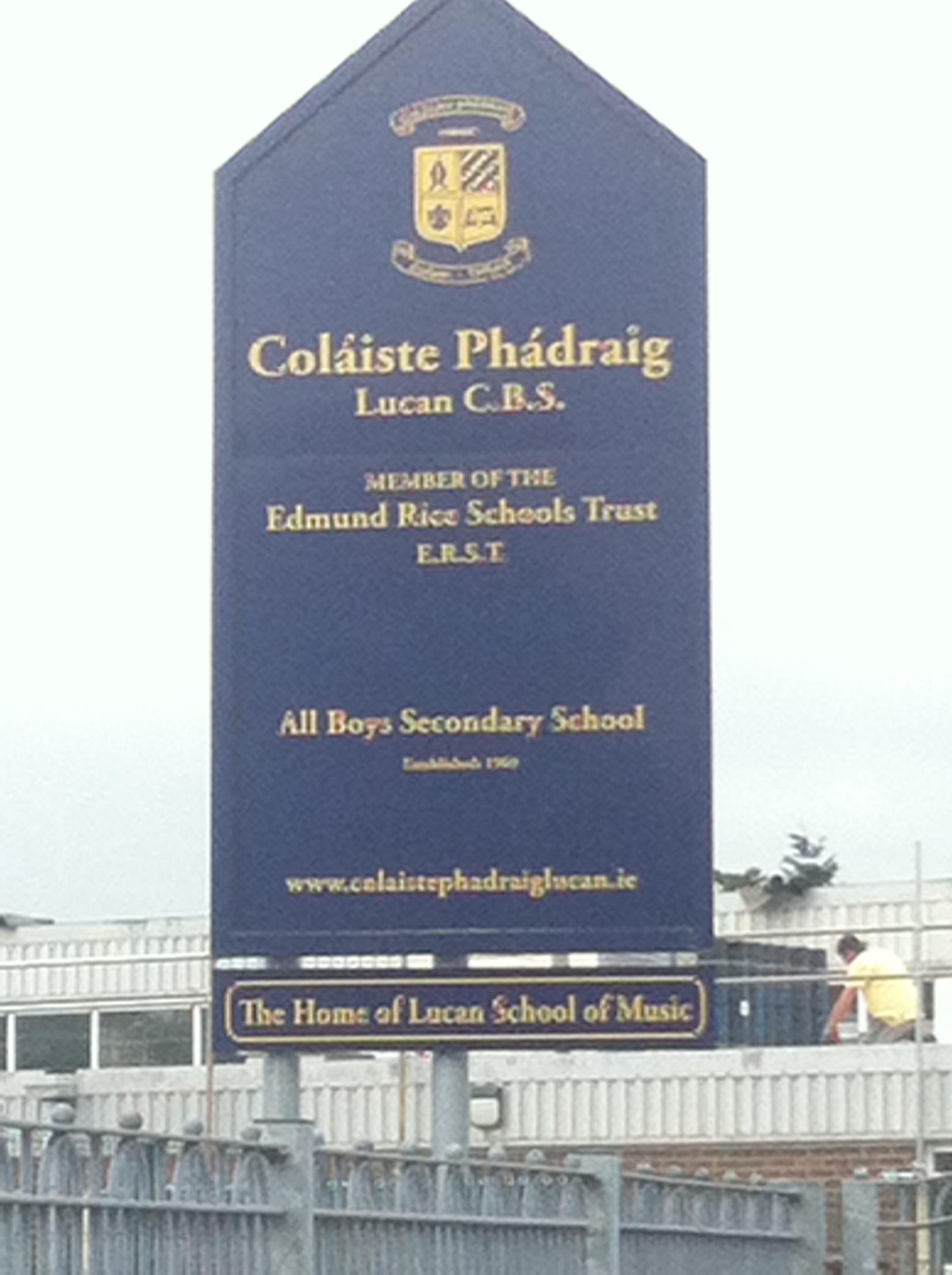

Location
- Lucan, Dublin; Ireland; 53.3568°N 6.4324°W

Information
- Type: Secondary school
- Motto: Críost Ionam ("Christ within me")
- Religious affiliation: Catholic
- Established: 1969
- Principal: Tom O'Meara
- Enrollment: 704
- Affiliation: Edmund Rice Schools Trust
- Website: Coláiste Phádraig

Coláiste Phádraig (St. Patrick's College) is a Christian Brothers secondary school for boys in Lucan, County Dublin, Ireland. It is located in an estate called Roselawn with a relatively large campus that includes three basketball courts, two football pitches, a large school building and a modern sports hall which includes a school gym. Coláiste Phádraig is part of the Edmund Rice Trust schools.

== History ==
The school opened in September 1969, and in its infancy was composed of merely two teachers and forty-five students. Initial lessons were taught in just one prefab. During the 1970s, in order to accommodate the increasing student population, more prefabs were added, until a new school building was commissioned, ultimately opening in 1978. Further growth and development occurred, resulting in an increase in the staff size of the school to thirty by the turn of the decade. However, with a spiking population in Lucan, the existing school building was no longer of a sufficient size, and thus a large extension was built in 2004 to expand the footprint of the school. The extension contained computer and science labs and a careers library in addition to new metalwork and woodwork rooms and a gym were also added.

In early 2023, a new 2-storey prefab was put in to the south-west of the current building. It contains 7 regular classrooms, a special needs unit, and a library. It was first used in June, by students of the nearby all-girls school, St. Joseph's College, sitting their Leaving Certificate as their school was undergoing renovations.

As of 2023, 57 teachers are situated in the school, which is attended by 704 students. Tom O'Meara is the current principal, while Tony Canning and Catherine McDonald are the current deputy principals. A memorial garden, in addition to a student award, has been erected in the school for Mark O'Neill, a student who died while attending the school.

== Notable alumni ==
- Johnny McCaffery - ex-captain of the Dublin hurling team.
- Derek McGrath (footballer) - ex-footballer with Brighton & Hove Albion F.C.
- Bryan McMahon - drummer with Future Kings of Spain
- Darragh Markey - footballer with St. Patrick's Athletic, winner of Centenary Shield with Ireland.
- Salvatore of Lucan - artist
- Daithí de Róiste - former Lord Mayor of Dublin

== Extra-curricular activities ==
The school operates a series of extra curricular activities. The school consistently takes part in the BT Young Scientist competition, and has produced multiple award winners at the exhibition. In 2012, the school's first year soccer team won the Leinster Cup, a schools tournament organised by the FAI. This was followed by similar successes in 2016. Recently, the school introduced rugby, cricket, hockey, and ultimate teams, as well as a debating squad, who compete in contests such as the Schools Competition, organised by Oxford Union. Furthermore, the school organises a 5-a-side tournament for charity, named in honour of Mark O'Neill.

In 2016, the school became All-Ireland Champions at the 'A' Grade in U16 Basketball following a meteoric rise in the sport.

The school is also renowned for its participation in many Irish-Language competitions such as Feachtas Tráth na gCéist, which it has won thrice and many Irish debating competitions. Due to these victories, Coláiste Phadráig CBS is considered one of the best non-Gaelscoil schools in teaching and promoting Gaeilge as a language. The school also supports Seachtain na Gaeilge (Irish-language week) every year.

== Facilities ==
The school has many modern facilities. These include five laboratories, four computer rooms, a metalwork and woodwork room, a home economics room, a large canteen and a study hall where all state examinations (the Junior and Leaving Certificate) take place. Outside, there are junior and senior yards, a soccer pitch, a Gaelic football and hurling pitch a car park for patrons of the school and two basketball courts. Soccer goals are also placed in the yards. A massive sports hall is situated beside the school building that has recently gone under renovation. It contains facilities for tennis, soccer, hockey, badminton, and basketball. It also contains a modern gymnasium that is used by students and teachers alike.

The school, equipped with multiple computer rooms, was selected as a trial school for the teaching of computer science as a Leaving Certificate subject.
