= St Finian's Esker church and graveyard =

St Finian's Esker
- Teampall Fhinnéin
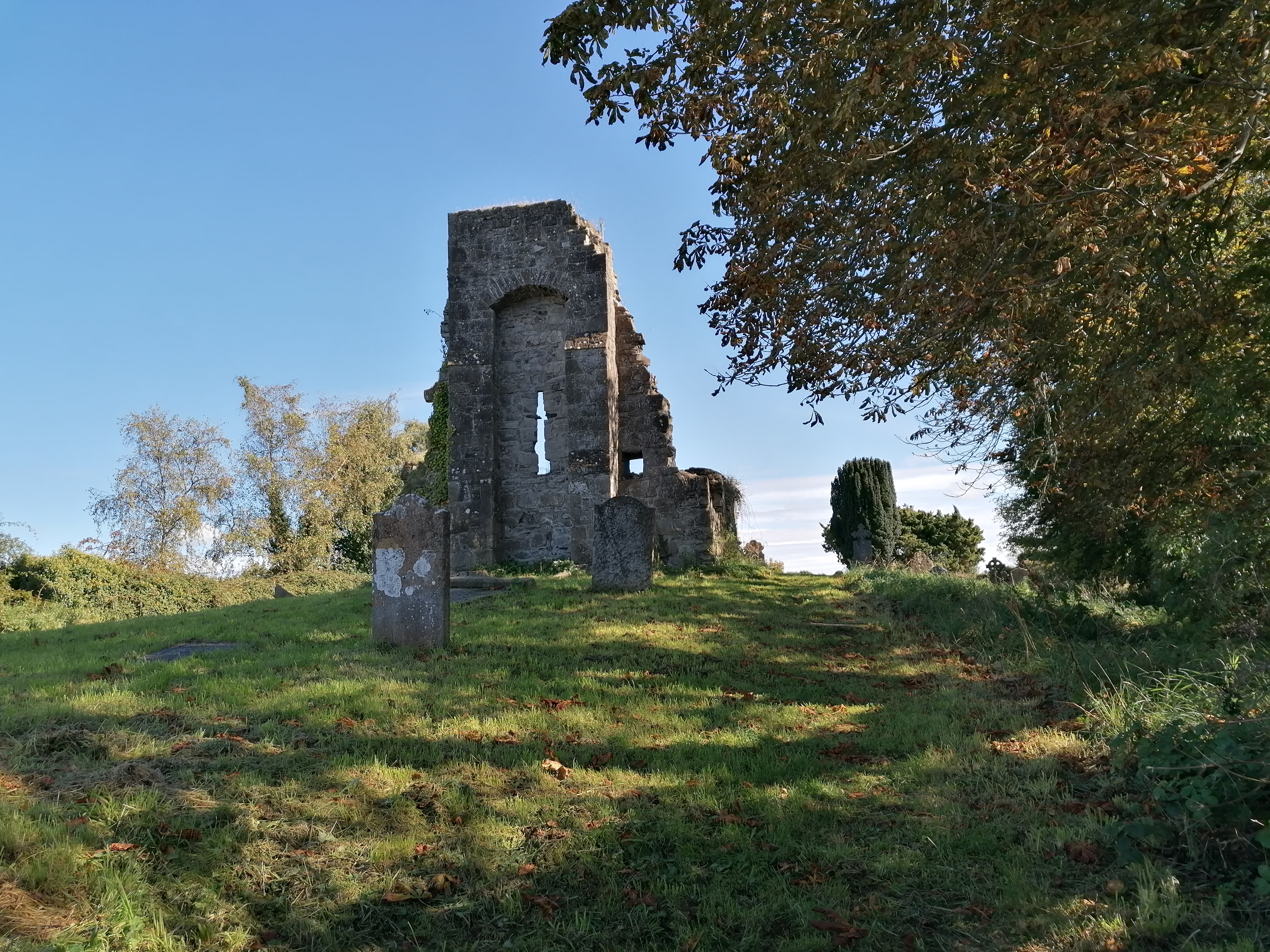
- West gable end of St. Finian's church ruin, Esker, County Dublin

- Location within Dublin
- 53°20′59″N 6°26′16″W
- Location: Esker, Lucan, Dublin
- Country: Ireland
- Denomination: Pre-Reformation Catholic

History
- Founded: 13th century
- Dedication: Finnian of Clonard

Architecture
- Functional status: Ruined
- Architectural type: Norman
- Years built: 17th century

Specifications
- Materials: stone

Administration
- Diocese: Dublin

St Finian's Esker church and graveyard is an historical site in Esker near Lucan, County Dublin, Ireland. It contains a medieval church in ruins and an enclosed graveyard. The graveyard has over 50 extant memorials from the early 18th century to the early 20th century. Both the church and graveyard are protected structures in the ownership of South Dublin County Council.

== Location and history ==
Situated in the suburban area of Esker, County Dublin near Lucan village, the church and graveyard are sited on a hill which overlooks the surrounding area. The location is significant as it on the Esker Riada along the Slighe Mhór, one of the five main ancient routes through the country.

Esker was one of four Medieval Royal Manors of Dublin. The church is near the site of the original Manor House of Esker and an ancient stone bridge constructed in the reign of King John of England, locally referred to as King John's Bridge. The church and graveyard are recorded by the National Monument Service of Ireland. It is a nave and chancel style parish church and has been reconstructed over many periods of use.

== Features ==
=== Church ===
The church is long and narrow. Records show it was re-roofed in the 16th century but was in ruin by the early 17th century. The west gable wall is buttressed and likely supported a double bellcote, it has a long and narrow embrasure. There is a double ogee arch window in the South wall. Only the foundations of the East wall remains. There is a short horizontal length of herringbone masonry in the North wall which is uncommon in Irish churches.

=== Graveyard ===
The earliest recorded gravestones in the graveyard date to the early 19th century. Other memorials include one for a priest, Father James McCartan, who was interred here following his murder in nearby Lucan in 1807. Another memorial depicts a carved skull and crossbones in a memento mori motif. A transcription of the gravestones was published in 1989 and contains records of approximately 60 memorials.

== Conservation ==
In 2019, the site was selected as the first Dublin monument in the Heritage Council "Adopt a Monument" scheme. In October 2020, conservation work commenced to stabilise the structure. Funding was provided by the National Monuments Service Community Monuments Fund through the Department of Housing, Local Government and Heritage and also supported by South Dublin County Council.

== Gallery ==
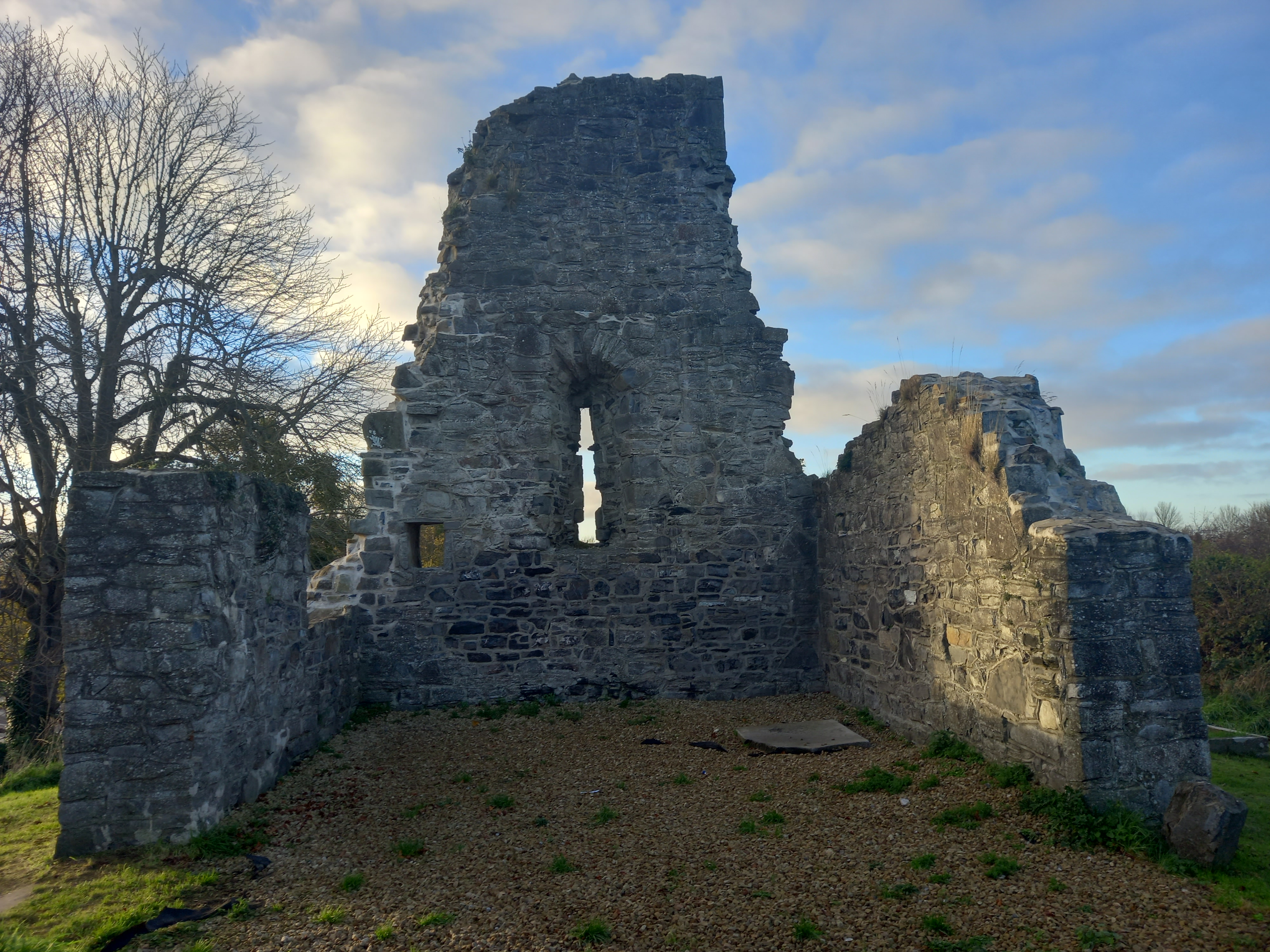
West wall (interior)

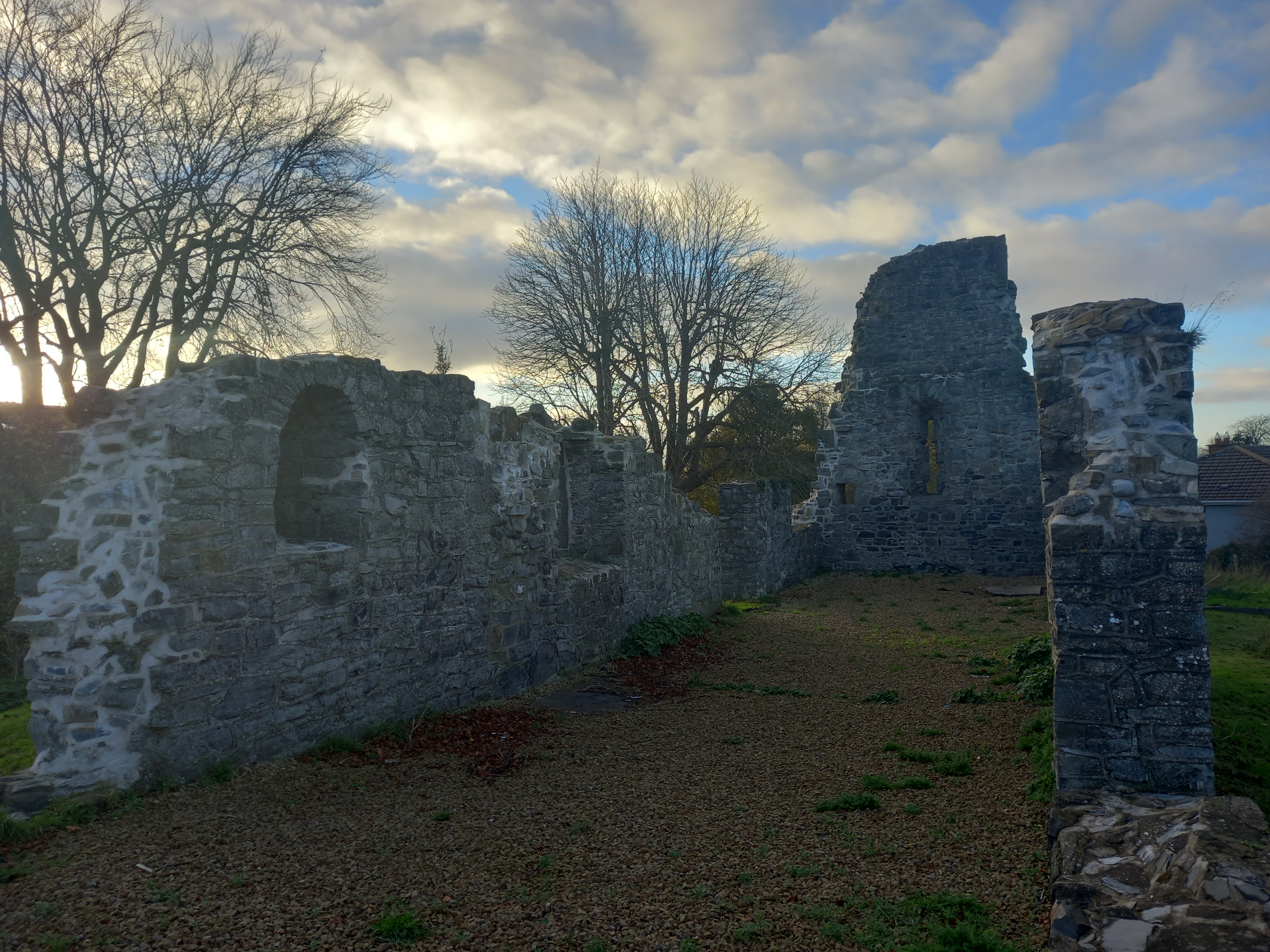
Church interior facing west

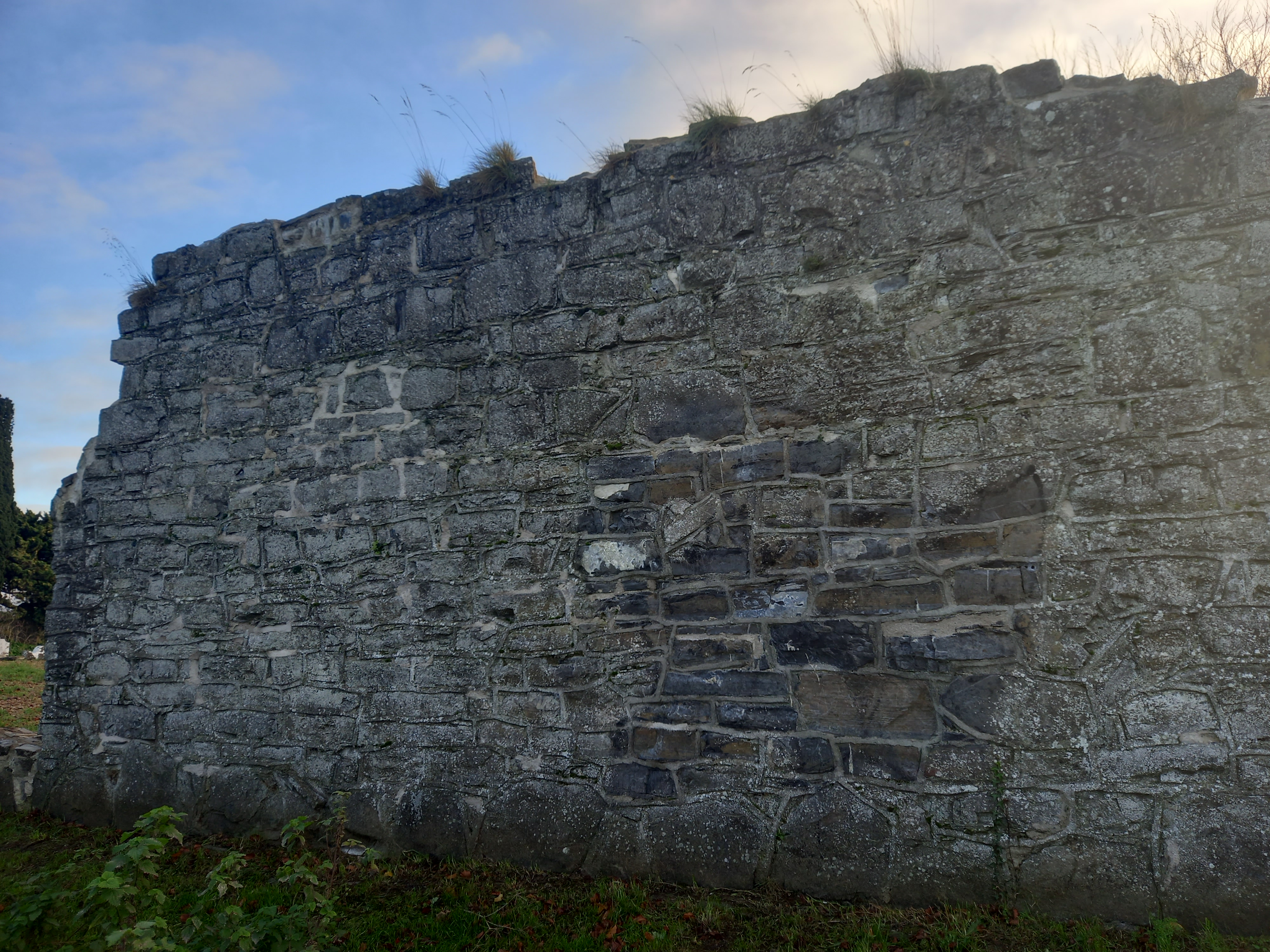
North wall (exterior)

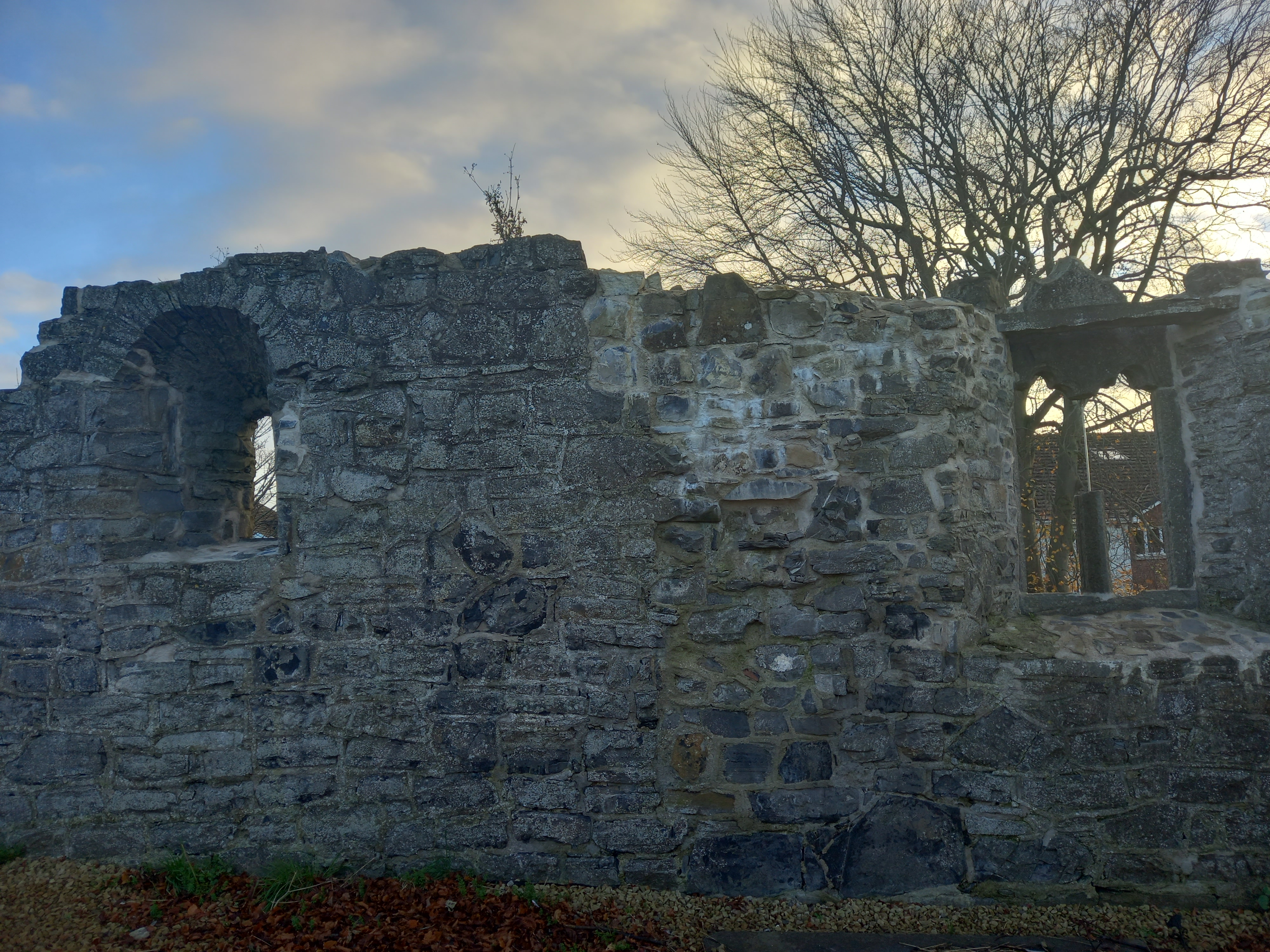
South wall (interior)

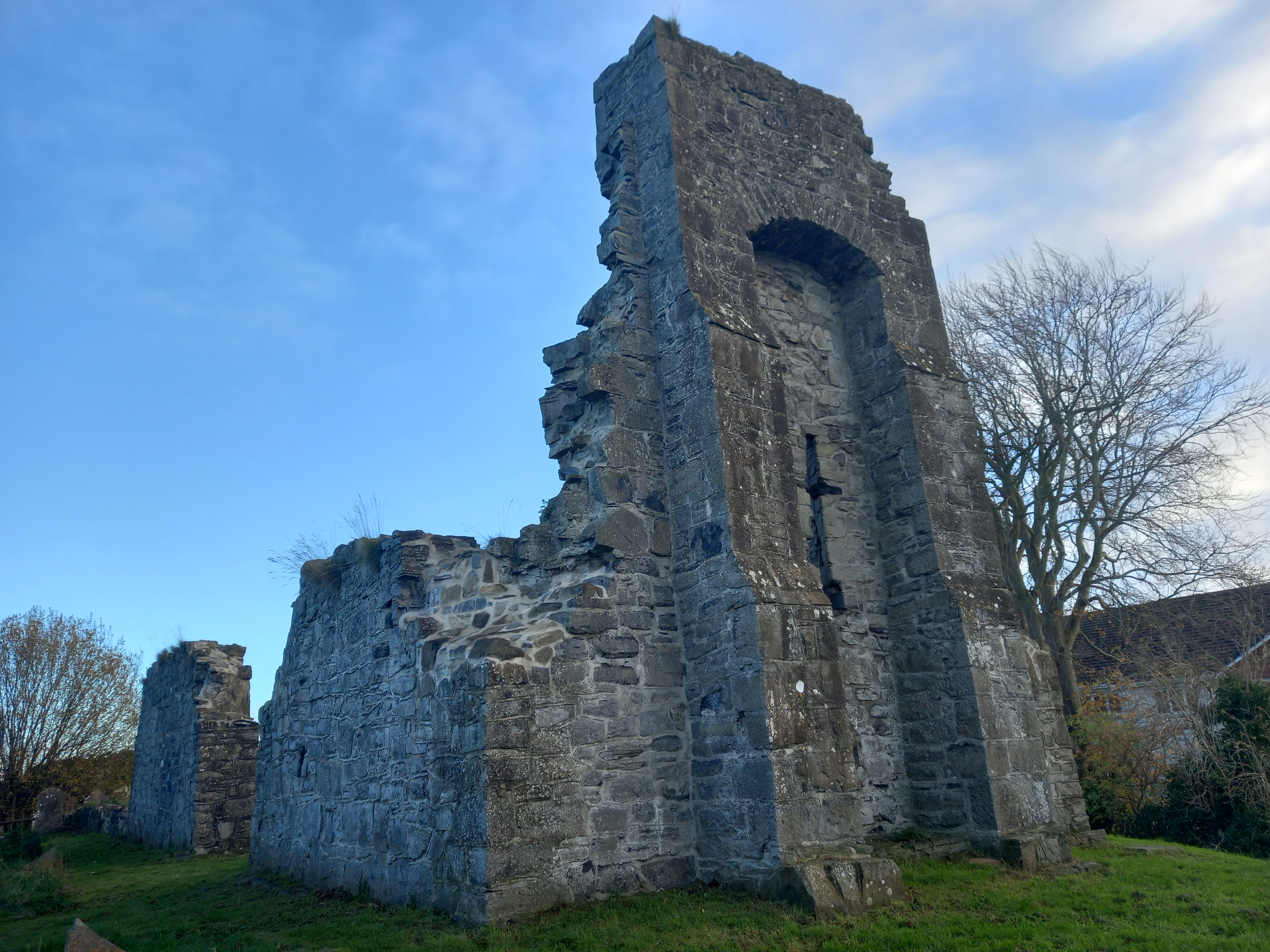
Northwest corner (exterior)
