= Lucan, Dublin =

Outer suburb of Dublin, Ireland

Lucan Leamhcán (Irish)
- Suburb (village core)
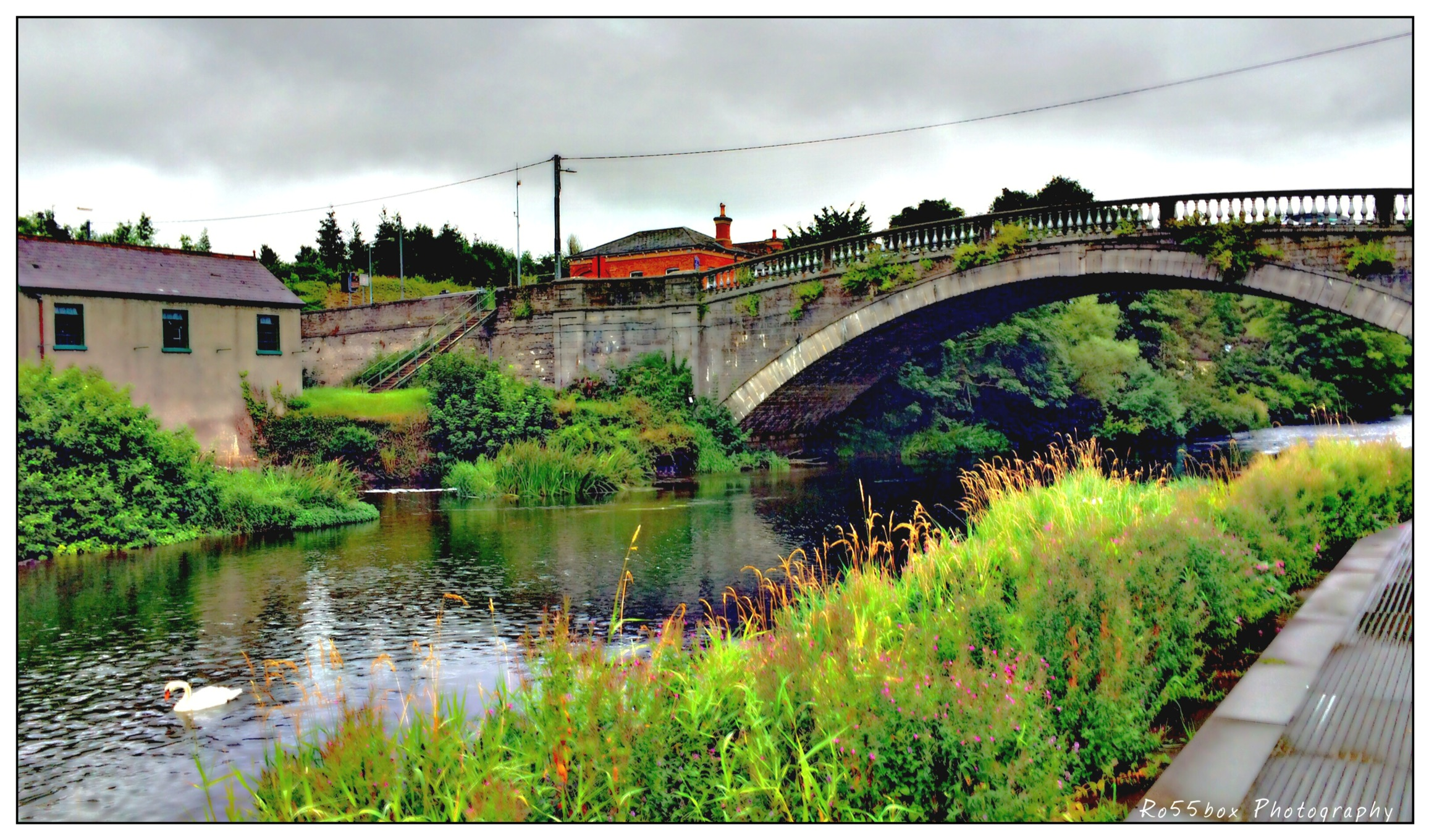
- The R109 road crosses the River Liffey at Coldblow Bridge, Lucan

- Location in County Dublin Lucan (Ireland)
- Coordinates: 53°21′16″N 6°26′55″W
- Country: Ireland
- Province: Leinster
- County: County Dublin
- Local government areas: South Dublin (mostly); Fingal (partially)
- Dáil constituency: Dublin Mid-West
- EP constituency: Dublin

Population (2022)
  - Urban: 57,550
- Time zone: UTC+0 (WET)
  - Summer (DST): UTC+1 (IST (WEST))
- Irish Grid Reference: O029352

Lucan (/ˈljuːkən/ LEW-kən; Irish: Leamhcán) is a suburban village to the west of Dublin, Ireland, located 12 km from Dublin city centre, on the River Liffey. It is near the Strawberry Beds and Lucan Weir, and at the confluence of the River Griffeen. It is mostly in the local government area of South Dublin, with the exception of the North Lucan areas of Laraghcon, Coldblow and Saint Catherine's Park, which are in Fingal. Lucan is in a townland and civil parish of the same name, in the barony of Newcastle. Road access to Lucan is from the N4, and the M50 motorway at Junction 7.

== Etymology ==
In the Irish language, leamhachán refers to the marsh-mallow plant, used up to modern times in folk medicine (for sprains and chest infections) and sweet manufacture, and so the name could be rendered as "place of marsh-mallow plants" or "land abounding in marsh-mallows." The plant grows in the Liffey Valley and surrounds, as recorded in the 1837 Ainmleabhar Paróiste, reported by Jackson (1914). In 1615, the area was described as 'a marshy place'... The alternative meaning is derived from the Irish for elm, leamhán, and has been more popularised, although both definitions could be equally valid, with both mallows and elms still growing in the Lucan area, and etymological experts unable to definitively choose one meaning over the other, as is evidenced on logainm.ie.

== History ==
=== Early history ===
Evidence of prehistoric settlement in the Lucan area includes sites in the Cooldrinagh townland of Lucan, with early Mesolithic flints found in significant quantities, as well as the remains of two small kerbed passage tombs. In the area around Vesey Park, there are remains of a hillfort (Knockanardousk "hill of the high water") that may have been the house and enclosure of an early lord of Lucan in medieval times. This enclosure also contained a souterrain, excavated in the 18th century by George Petrie and of which, some of the finds are in the National Museum of Ireland. Another notable archaeological site is St Finian's Esker church and graveyard, which is listed by both the National Monuments Service and the National Inventory of Architectural Heritage. There are two other medieval churches in Lucan also; the Church of the Blessed Virgin, Lucan village (an enclosed gated graveyard & medieval church site with attached chantry or tower house, and the medieval parish church of Aderrig, Lucan, off Tubber Lane.

=== Sarsfields and Veseys ===
When Oliver Cromwell came to Ireland, Lucan was a village of 120 inhabitants.

In 1566, Sir William Sarsfield acquired Lucan Manor, and the property became closely associated with the Sarsfield family. Patrick Sarsfield, the Irish Jacobite leader, was born in the castle that had occupied the manor grounds and was granted the title Earl of Lucan by James II.

Lucan House was built on the site of Sarsfield's castle in 1772, by the Rt Hon. Agmondisham Vesey, who was descended from the Sarsfield family. The circular ground floor dining room is said to have been an inspiration for the Oval Office of the White House. The decorative plasterwork was carried out by Michael Stapleton. Over the years, the house passed out of the Vesey family and, from 1942 until 2024, was the residence of the Italian ambassador to Ireland.

=== Developments ===
Historical population
Year	Pop.	±%
1811	991	—
1821	1,162	+17.3%
1831	1,229	+5.8%
1841	562	−54.3%
1851	578	+2.8%
1861	552	−4.5%
1871	523	−5.3%
1881	691	+32.1%
1891	843	+22.0%
1901	972	+15.3%
1911	919	−5.5%
1926	849	−7.6%
1936	867	+2.1%
1946	1,029	+18.7%
1951	1,297	+26.0%
1956	1,594	+22.9%
1961	1,657	+4.0%
1966	2,100	+26.7%
1971	4,245	+102.1%
1981	11,763	+177.1%
1986	12,259	+4.2%
1991	13,931	+13.6%
1996	19,821	+42.3%
2002	33,272	+67.9%
2006	37,424	+12.5%
2011	45,861	+22.5%
2016	49,279	+7.5%
2022	57,550	+16.8%
As of the 2022 census for all ED labels including "Lucan".

The discovery of a sulphurous spa in Lucan in 1758 brought the district into prominence, and it became a destination for weekend parties from Dublin and the surrounding countryside. Several developments followed in the vicinity, and by 1795 a ballroom and a later hotel had been erected. Many of the structures in Lucan village were constructed as part of a large redevelopment around 1815. Later, Lucan was a terminus on the combination of tram lines serving Lucan and Leixlip from Dublin city centre.

Described by Weston St. John Joyce in 1912 as a "pretty town", as of the early 21st century, Lucan's village core "remained largely intact". Between 1971 and 1976, Lucan's population increased from 4,245 to 12,451. By the time of the 2006 census it had a population of approximately 37,300. This growth was precipitated by development of housing estates in the surrounding area with a study, undertaken in the early 21st century, noting a disconnect between Lucan village and some of the surrounding housing developments.

== Transport and access ==
Lucan village is located north of the N4/M4 national primary route to the west and northwest of Ireland. The village is approximately 5 km (3.1 mi) west of the M50 Dublin ring road. An outer-orbital distributor called the Outer Ring Road, designated as R136, from the N4 (Woodies) interchange to the N81 Tallaght Bypass, was completed in 2008.

As the first non-toll bridge located to the west of the paid West-Link toll bridge, Lucan Bridge and the roads approaching it witness a large volume of traffic on a daily basis as north and south-bound motorists use it as a rat run to save money. Speaking of the impact this has had on the local community, Fianna Fáil local election candidate Caitríona McClean was quoted as saying "The people of Lucan not only have to deal with the excessive traffic and the inconvenience this has on their daily lives but it also impacts the local environment given the dirt it creates, the air pollution and the noise. Old Rectory and Sarsfield Park residents are particularly impacted [...] with cars bumper to bumper blocking the entrance and exit to their estates during rush hours in particular".

Lucan is located between two major national/commuter railway lines. The original Lucan North (Leixlip) Station on the north/northwest line, and Lucan South station on the south/southwest line, were closed in 1941 and 1947, respectively. The greenfield development of the Lucan townlands as a major residential area was predicated on the location between the motorways and railways. Adamstown railway station re-opened in 2007 to serve the Adamstown area; it is located south of Finnstown, Lucan.

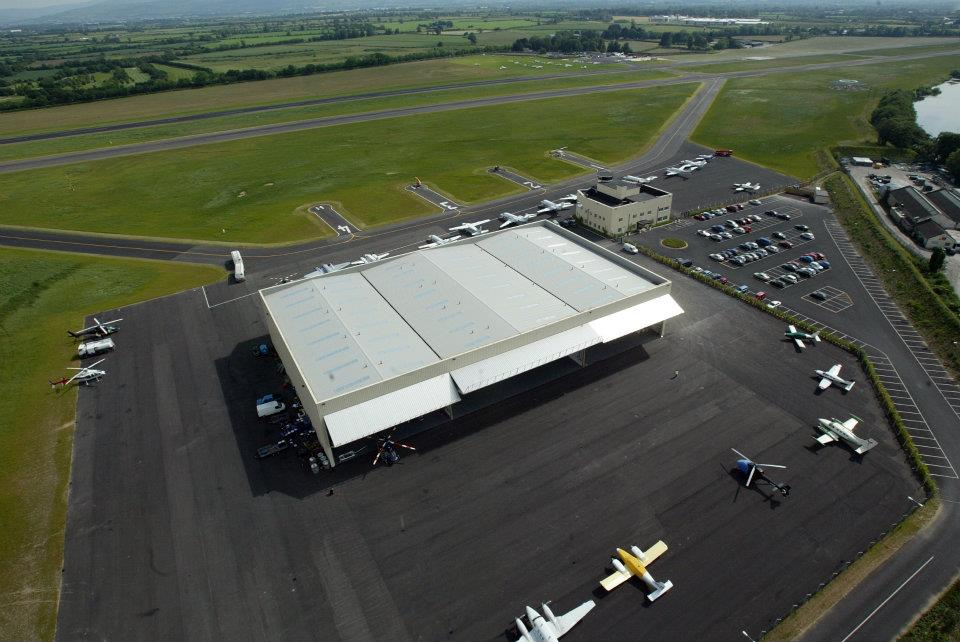
Weston Airport, near Lucan, County Dublin

Dublin Bus provides several bus services to the area. Feeder routes, such as the L52, run through Lucan from Adamstown station to Blanchardstown. Some independent bus operators also serve Lucan.

Weston Airport is located to the west of Lucan near the Dublin/Kildare border. This facility conducts pilot training and serves privately owned light aircraft and helicopters.

== Features ==
=== King John's Bridge ===
King John's Bridge in Griffeen Park is reputed to be the oldest surviving bridge in Ireland, having apparently been constructed sometime during the reign of John, King of England from 1199 to 1216. Originally composed of three arches, only one arch survives today, and is in a ruinous state. The bridge, which is a designated protected structure, is situated in quiet parkland and crosses the narrow Griffeen River; sited close to the ruins of Old Esker Church. Postcards were printed of the bridge in the 1930s such was its renown.

=== Lucan House ===
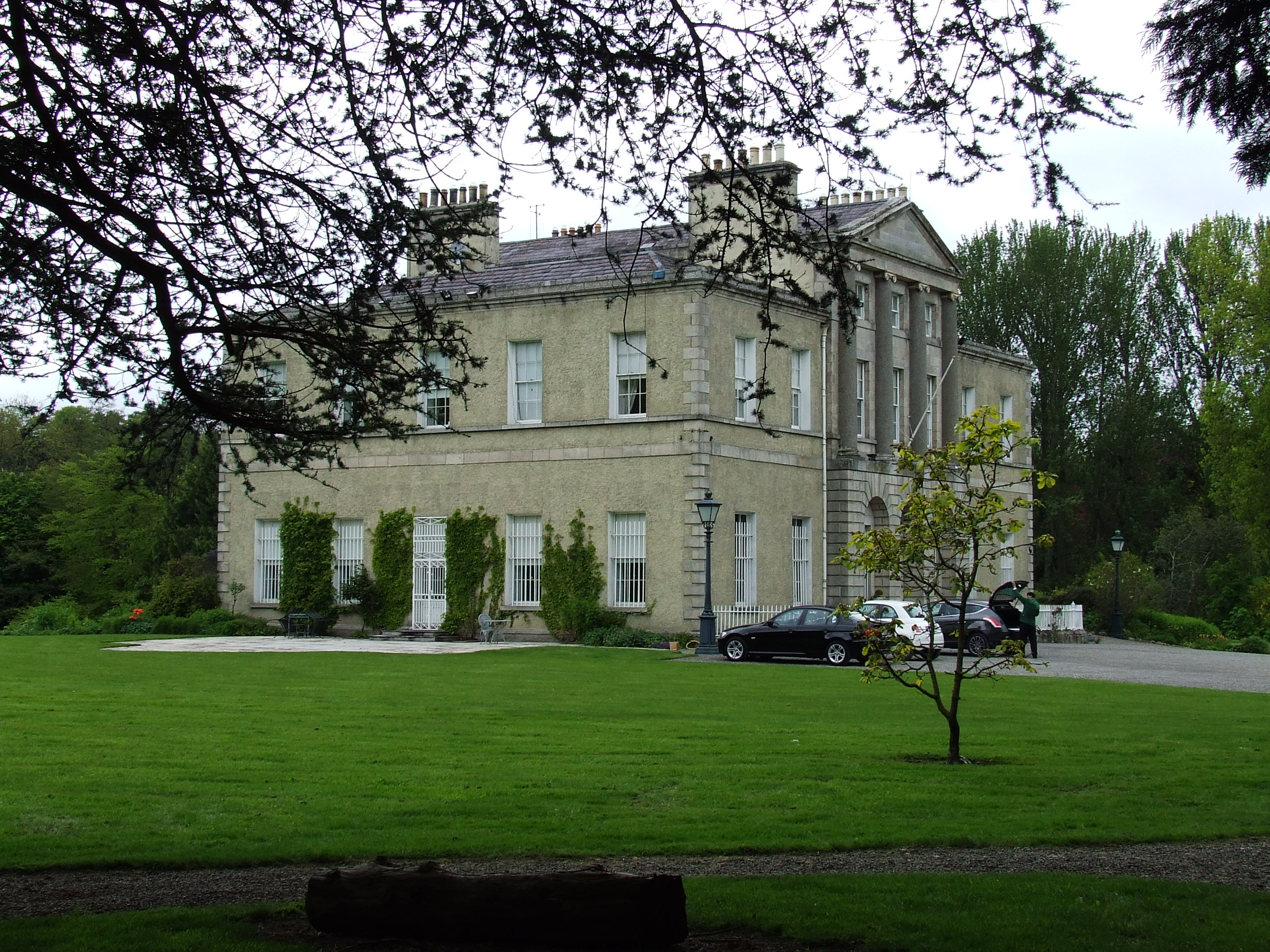
Lucan House was previously the residence of the Italian ambassador to Ireland

Lucan House is a seven-bay two-storey over basement Palladian country villa. Agmonisham Vesey cleared the previous residence and began construction in 1772. The architecture is the work of Vesey and William Chambers, with Michael Stapleton responsible for the plasterwork. The estate passed through the Sarsfield, Vesey and Colthurst families through marriage and also was once the residence of Charles Hugh O'Conor, the third son of Charles Owen O'Conor and then, in 1954, it was purchased by the Italian Government for use as the residence of the Italian Ambassador to Ireland. The remainder of the estate land is now Liffey Valley Park.

=== Ruined medieval church ===
Another notable feature is St Finian's medieval church and graveyard at Esker.

== Amenities ==
The Griffeen Valley Park runs along the Griffeen River, with some smaller outlying park areas among housing developments to the west. The main area of the park is split by the Lucan bypass, with Vesey Park on one side and Griffeen Park on the other. A feature of the park is the old woodland in Vesey Park that was retained when the park was formed. This woodland is most extensive along the Griffeen River and contains mature deciduous and coniferous trees. An area of the park, along the river, contains a wet woodland with extensive fern and bryophyte growth. The woodland also provides a habitat for the protected species Hypericum hirsutum.

Lucan Library is part of a network of libraries in South Dublin.

== Education ==
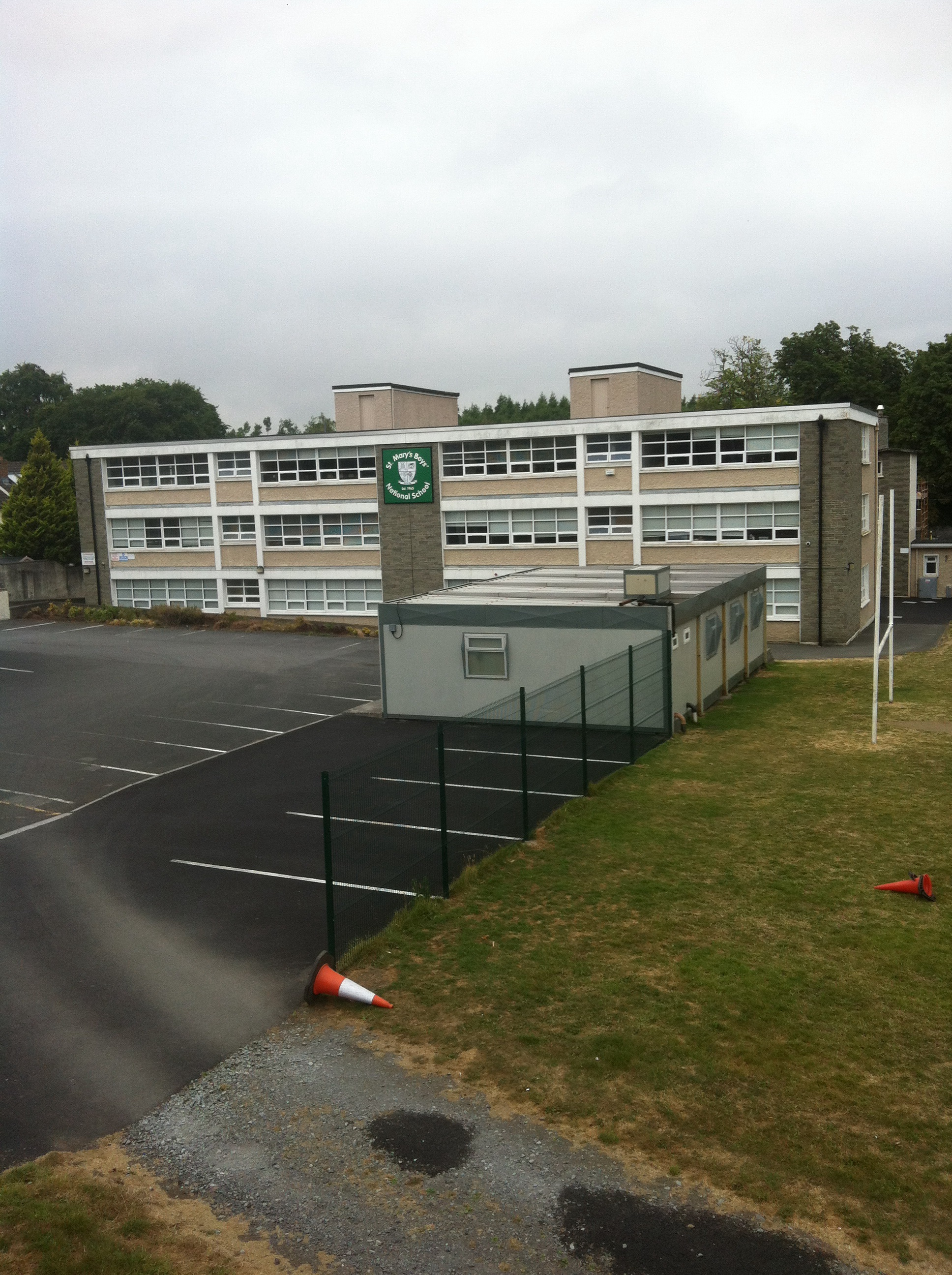
St. Mary's Boy's National School

Lucan has a number of schools. St. Mary's Boys National School (BNS) is the oldest school which dates back to 1833. Other schools include Scoil Mhuire Girls Primary School, St. Joseph's Girls Secondary School, Kishoge Community College (mixed), Griffeen Community College (mixed), Coláiste Phádraig (a Christian Brothers secondary school), St. Andrew's (mixed) National School, Lucan Community College, Esker Educate Together primary school, Scoil Áine and St. Thomas's primary schools (Esker, mixed VEC school), Divine Mercy National School (mixed primary), Scoil Mhuire (mixed primary), Adamstown Castle Educate Together, St John The Evangelist primary schools and Adamstown Community College. There are two Irish-speaking primary schools, Gaelscoil Eiscir Riada and Gaelscoil Naomh Pádraig (mixed), and an Irish-speaking secondary school, Coláiste Cois Life.

== Media ==
Lucan has a free magazine, The Link, that contains items of local interest. The Lucan Newsletter, used by local organizations to report on activities and meetings, was first published in 1967 and is produced and published weekly by volunteers. Local newspapers include the Liffey Champion (a weekly newspaper for the Lucan area of South Dublin and North Kildare), The Echo (published in Lucan as the Lucan Echo), and the Lucan Gazette.

Liffey Sound Communications Co-operative Society Limited, a not-for-profit organisation, runs Liffey Sound FM, the local community radio station. Liffey Sound FM is another local media source run entirely by volunteers. The station has been broadcasting since July 2006.

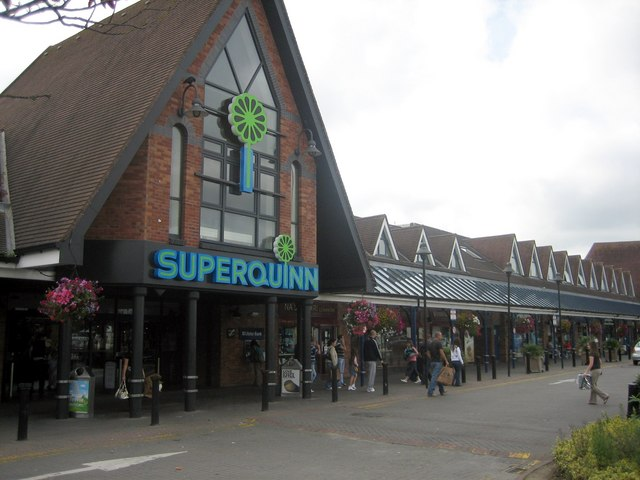
Lucan Shopping Centre

== Economy ==
In terms of retail, the main street contains the newsagent Centra, bookmakers, boutiques, banks, charity shops, IT shops and cafés. The Lucan Shopping Centre includes SuperValu, Dunnes Stores, Peter Mark, and McDonald's, along with a Community Library.

The area is primarily a residential one, but employers in the area include the Liffey Valley Shopping Centre, Citywest and Tallaght in southwest Dublin, Intel in Leixlip, County Kildare, and eBay's European operation in Blanchardstown.

== Climate ==
Lucan has an oceanic climate (Köppen: Cfb).

Climate data for Lucan
Month	Jan	Feb	Mar	Apr	May	Jun	Jul	Aug	Sep	Oct	Nov	Dec	Year
Mean daily maximum °C (°F)	7.4 (45.3)	8.1 (46.6)	9.6 (49.3)	11.8 (53.2)	14.7 (58.5)	17.3 (63.1)	18.7 (65.7)	18.3 (64.9)	16.5 (61.7)	13.3 (55.9)	9.8 (49.6)	7.9 (46.2)	12.8 (55.0)
Daily mean °C (°F)	5.2 (41.4)	5.5 (41.9)	6.5 (43.7)	8.4 (47.1)	11.3 (52.3)	13.9 (57.0)	15.4 (59.7)	15.1 (59.2)	13.3 (55.9)	10.5 (50.9)	7.4 (45.3)	5.6 (42.1)	9.8 (49.7)
Mean daily minimum °C (°F)	2.8 (37.0)	2.9 (37.2)	3.5 (38.3)	5.0 (41.0)	7.7 (45.9)	10.4 (50.7)	12.2 (54.0)	12.0 (53.6)	10.2 (50.4)	7.8 (46.0)	4.9 (40.8)	3.4 (38.1)	6.9 (44.4)
Average precipitation mm (inches)	62.7 (2.47)	58.4 (2.30)	58.0 (2.28)	60.1 (2.37)	74.0 (2.91)	72.3 (2.85)	81.1 (3.19)	79.6 (3.13)	68.9 (2.71)	84.2 (3.31)	80.8 (3.18)	74.0 (2.91)	854.1 (33.61)
Source: Weather.Directory

== Local organisations and charities ==
Lucan Disability Action Group was established, in October 2000, to address the needs of people with disabilities in the Lucan area.

== Sport ==
=== GAA ===
Lucan has three Gaelic Athletic Association (GAA) teams. Lucan Sarsfields, the largest sports organisation in the town, was founded in 1886. Its grounds are located on the 12th Lock on the Grand Canal. Lucan Sarsfields were runners up on the 2013 Dublin Senior Hurling Championship final. Club members have included the former Dublin hurling captain Johnny McCaffrey.

Westmanstown Gaels are also located in north Lucan at the Westmanstown Sports Centre, which has diversified from its roots as a leisure centre for the Garda Síochána.

An Irish-language GAA club, Na Gaeil Óga CLG, started their juvenile structure in the area in September 2014 and is based in Gaelscoileanna and a Gaelcholáiste in the area, Gaelscoil Naomh Pádraig, Gaelscoil Eiscir Riada and Coláiste Cois Life. The majority of the club's adult teams play in St Catherine's Park.

=== Football ===
Several football teams play in the area: Arthur Griffith Park FC, Griffeen Celtic, Beech Park, Esker Celtic, Ballyowen Celtic, Hillcrest AFC, Liffey Valley Rangers FC, and Lucan United FC. The latter, Lucan United, was included in the list of clubs proposed to contest the inaugural season of the FAI National League in Autumn 2026.

=== Boxing ===
Esker Amateur Boxing Club hosted the first-ever All-Female Amateur Boxing tournament in Ireland. As of 2016, it had grown to become Europe's largest female-only boxing tournament. Another boxing club, Lucan Boxing Club, was reformed in 2008 after several years of hiatus.

=== Other sports ===
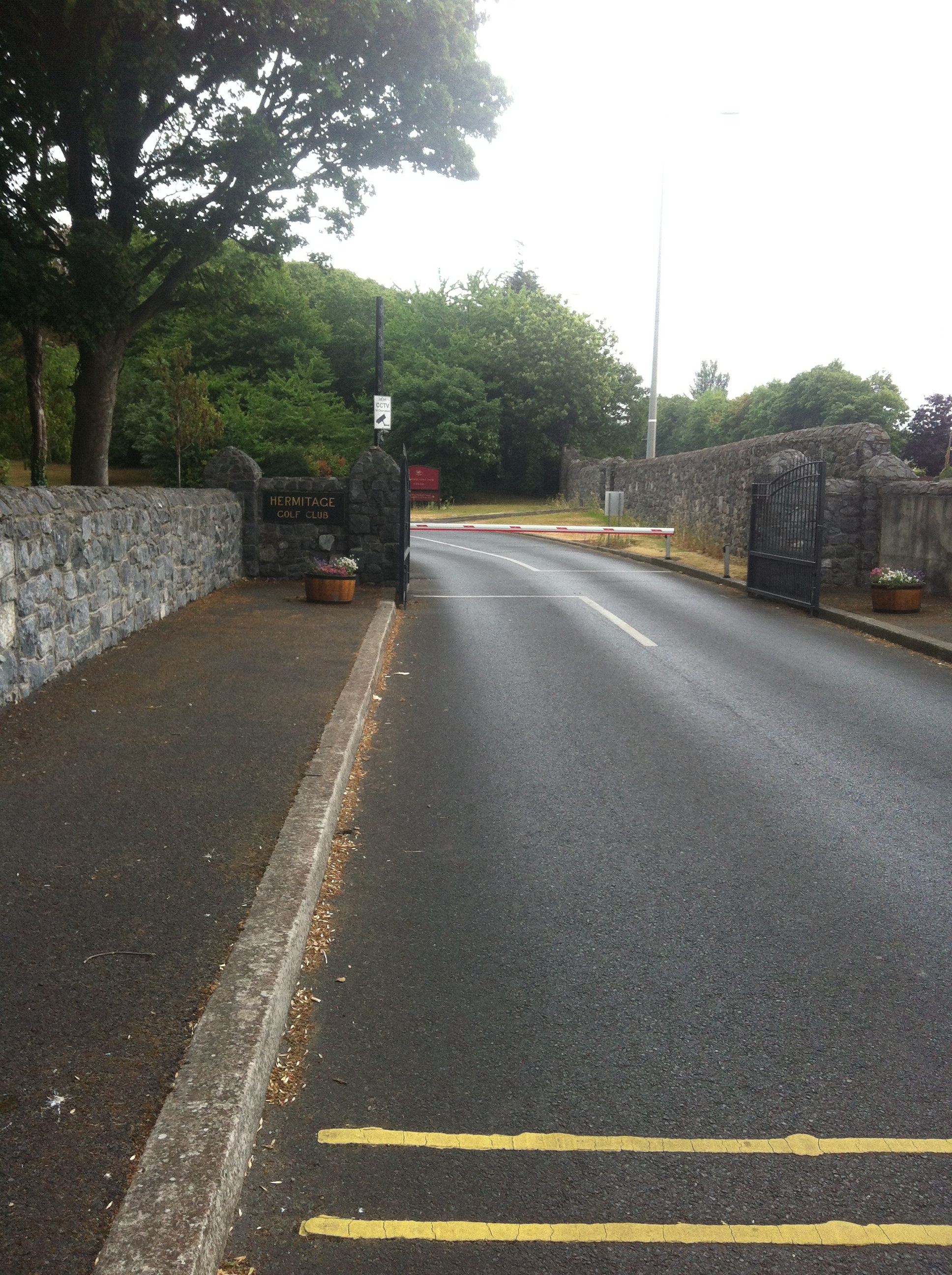
Entrance to Hermitage Golf Club

The two main golf courses in Lucan are Lucan Golf Club and Hermitage Golf Club. Both courses are member-run. Another nearby course, Liffey Valley Par 3, is situated between Leixlip and Lucan.

Liffey Celtics Basketball Club is a basketball club for girls and boys aged 7 and upwards. It was formed in 2003, and enters teams into competitions organised by the Dublin Area Board. The club's senior women's team competes in the Basketball Ireland Super League. The club was named Basketball Ireland "Club of the Year" in 2011.

== Awards ==
In September 2013, Lucan Village claimed the South Dublin title in the Tidy Towns competition.

== People ==
Former or current residents of the town have included:

- James Abankwah (born 2004) – professional footballer
- Millenic Alli (born 2000) – professional footballer
- Aaron Callaghan (born 1966) – football manager
- Tommy Carr (born 1961) – former Dublin GAA inter-county footballer and manager
- Jake Carroll (born 1991) – professional footballer
- Joanne Doyle (born 1973) – Irish dancer with Riverdance
- Joan Freeman (born 1958) – founder of Pieta House
- James Gandon (1743-1823) – architect
- Paul Gogarty (born 1968) – politician and Teachta Dála for Dublin Mid-West
- John and Edward Grimes, known professionally as Jedward (born 1991) – singing duo
- James Alexander Hamilton Irwin (1876-1954) – Presbyterian minister and a supporter of Irish unity and independence.
- Derek Keating (1955-2023) - politician
- Ciarán Kelly (born 1998) – professional footballer
- Liam Lawlor (1945-2005) – politician
- Salvatore of Lucan, pseudonym of Salvatore Fullam (born 1994) – Irish artist
- Darragh Markey (born 1997) – professional footballer
- John McCaffrey (born 1987) – Dublin GAA inter-county hurler
- Derek McGrath (born 1972) – professional footballer
- Laura Nolan (born 1994) - choreographer
- Patrick Sarsfield (1655-1693) – Lucan born Jacobite leader. Earl of Lucan
- Jack Sheedy – Dublin GAA inter-county footballer and All Ireland winner
- Joanna Tuffy (born 1965) - politician and councillor for Lucan electoral area

== See also ==
- Earl of Lucan
