= Salvatore of Lucan =

Irish figurative artist (born 1994)

- Born: Salvatore Fullam; 1994 (age 31–32); Lucan, Dublin
- Education: National College of Art and Design
- Occupation: Painter
- Years active: 2018-
- Awards: Whyte's Award, RHA, 2019 Zurich Portrait Prize, 2021

Salvatore Fullam (born 1994), known professionally as Salvatore of Lucan, is an Irish artist from Lucan, Dublin. He primarily paints large-scale works most of which focus on his own life and explore themes of home, identity and relationships. The Irish Museum of Modern Art described his work as featuring "expansive domestic scenes where realism meets the uncanny, and the familiar broaches the magical."

== Life ==
Fullam is mixed race, with a Bangladeshi father and an Irish mother. His parents met in Munich in the 1980s. He did not know his father growing up and was raised by his mother, alongside his younger sister, in Lucan. He attended CBS Lucan.

Fullam's uncle was a self-taught artist whose surrealist oil paintings were "all over" the house as he grew up. He remembers looking at them as a child and trying to figure out their meaning.

Fullam met his father for the first time in 2018 in New York, an encounter he depicted in "Me and my Dad in McDonalds" (2018). Fullam said his father had been "an illegal immigrant for over half his life, leaving Bangladesh and going from country to country until finally ending up in America."

== Name ==
In 2018, Fullam decided to start painting under the alias 'Salvatore of Lucan'. The format recalls renaissance artists such as Leonardo da Vinci, who were often known by their place of birth.

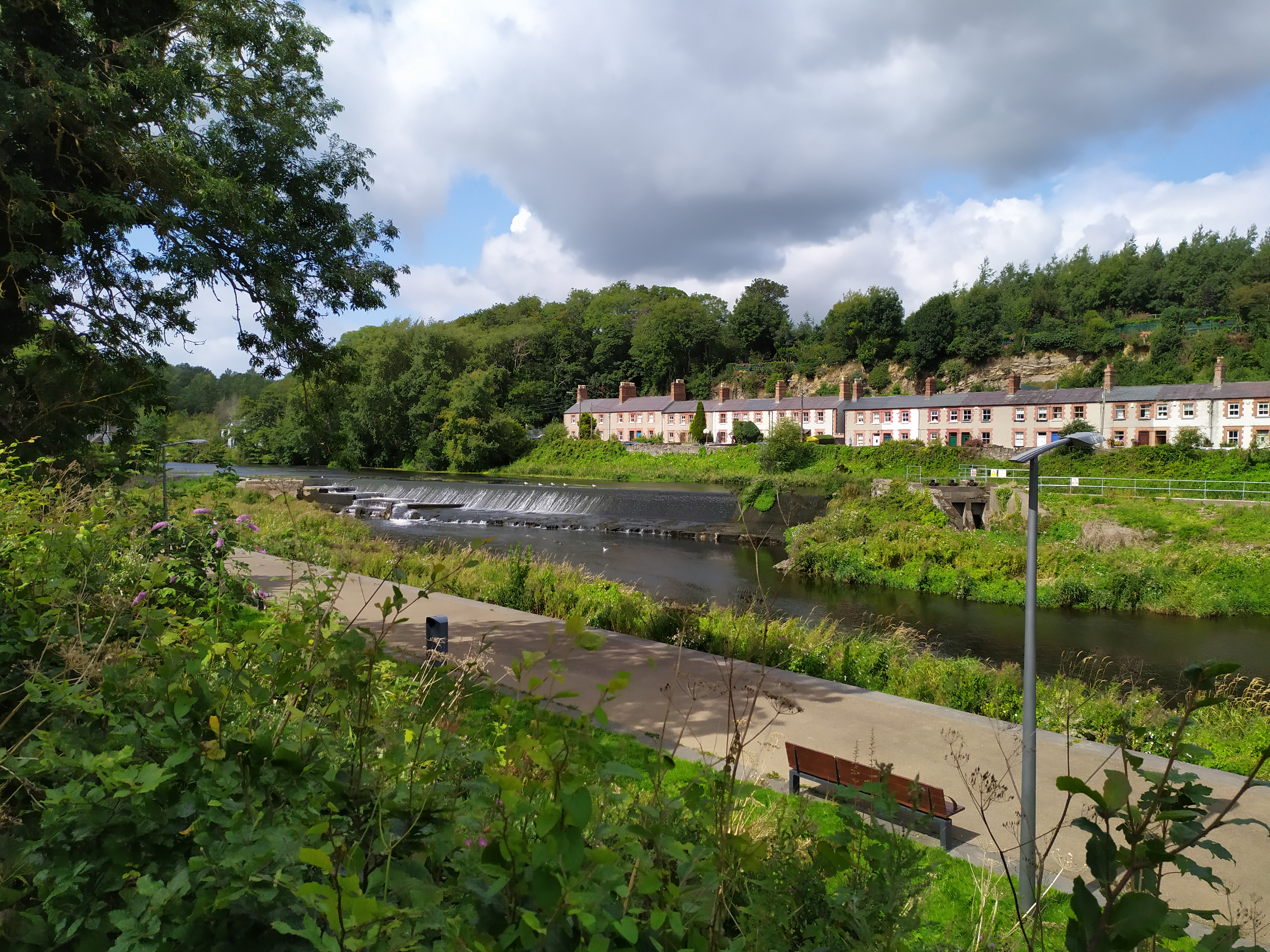
The River Liffey as it flows through the suburb of Lucan in summertime

He has described being asked where he is from often, despite being Irish, a situation complicated by his Italian first name:

"...And also, I'm not Italian at all, I just have an Italian name. I used to have to tell my whole life story when people asked me where I was from. Also, I love Lucan. And I'm from there".

== Career ==
Fullam was not academically gifted and found it an "easy choice" to go to art college, where he studied Fine Art Painting but was initially interested in studying fashion. He graduated from the National College of Art and Design in 2016. As Fullam explained in a 2024 interview:

"I started my career by going on the dole and renting a studio that I rarely left. After about one or two years, I started getting into some group shows. Eventually I was given a show in Pallas Projects as part of their program there".

His first show, entitled Show of Himself, took place in Pallas Projects, Dublin in 2018. In 2019, he won the Whyte's Award at the RHA annual exhibition and was nominated for Hennessy Craig Award, appearing in RTÉ's Exhibitionists - Road to the RHA documentary, which followed artists seeking to feature in the show. He also received the Arts Council's Next Generation Award. He participated in Culture Night 2020 as part of an Arts Council showcase of paintings that had been recently added to its collection.

Fullam's first time exhibiting paintings outside of Ireland was at the Meštrović Pavilion in Zagreb as part of Pallas Projects '6th Biennial of Painting' in October 2021.

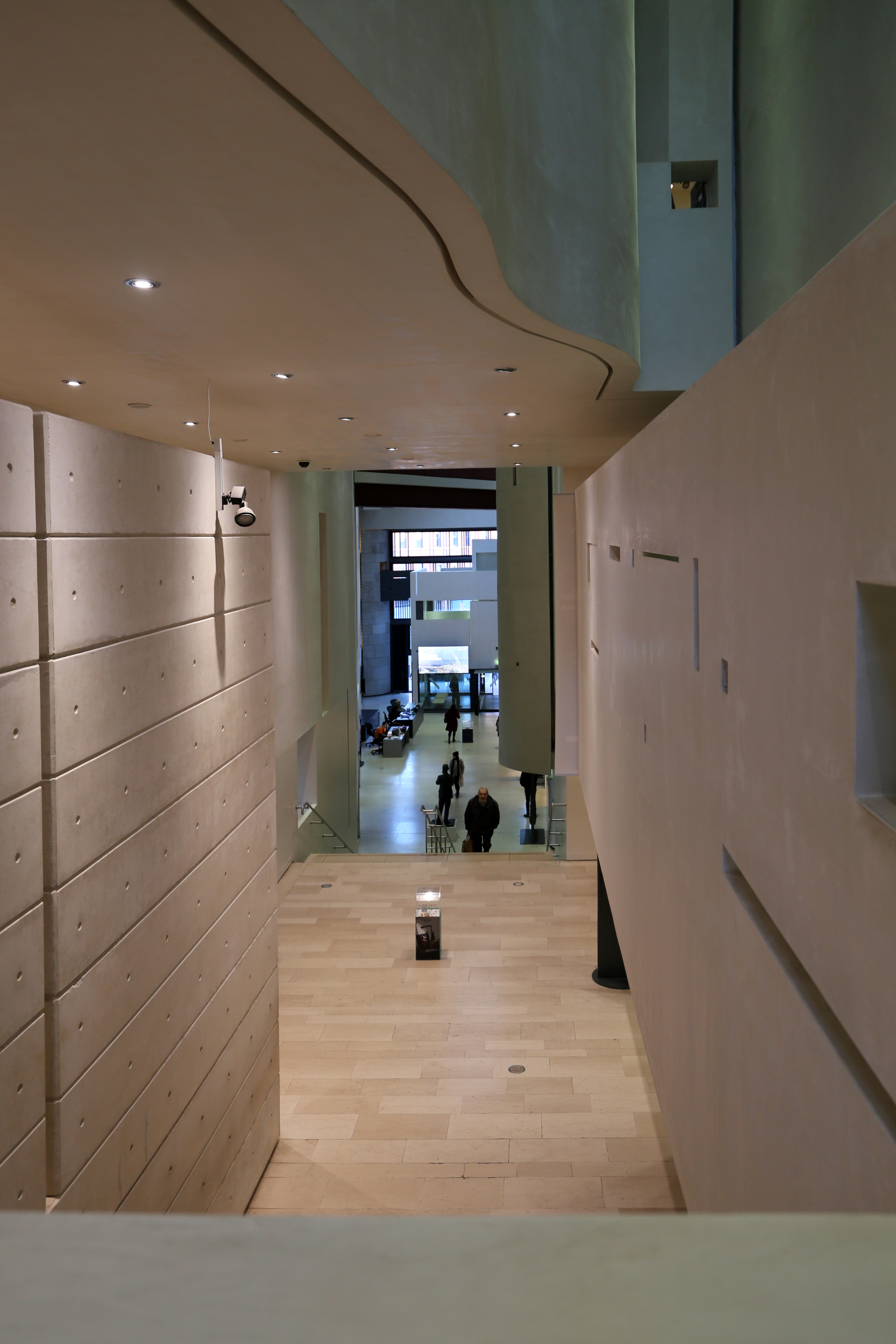
The interior of the National Gallery of Ireland

He won the National Gallery of Ireland's Zurich Portrait Prize on 30 November 2021 for his submission Me Ma Healing Me (2020), which was inspired by his mother's use of sound healing and reiki to care for him. He had been nominated twice before for the same award.

In 2023, Fullam was commissioned by the Arts Committee of the Law Library at the King's Inns, Dublin to paint the six former Taoisigh who trained at the establishment. The individuals in question were John Bruton, Liam Cosgrave, John A Costello, Garret FitzGerald, Charles Haughey and Jack Lynch. The work was unveiled in October 2024 at the King's Inns by then-Taoiseach Simon Harris.

Fullam's show Fancy Situations opened at Dublin's Kevin Kavanagh Gallery on 6 June 2024. Irish author Megan Nolan wrote the accompanying text for the show.

In 2025, a portrait of Irish international footballer Paul McGrath commissioned by the National Gallery of Ireland went on display in the gallery's Dargan Wing.

From March to April 2026, the Dunamaise Arts Centre presented Fullam's show titled "Fancy Situations Dead Present Etc...". The Laois Nationalist described it as a "striking insight into the artist's evolving visual language, one that moves fluently between contemporary portraiture, narrative painting, and symbolic figuration."

Fullam was shortlisted for the Hennessy Craig Prize at the Royal Hibernian Academy in both 2019 and 2026.

== Artistic style ==
Fullam's paintings feature "figurative domestic scenes" where "the familiar approaches the magical". He notes: "My day to day life is also a mix between realism and imagination. So, I depict it the same way I experience them in real life".

Fullam has said that he can spend weeks just on graph paper before he starts painting a large-scale work.

== Influences ==
Fullam wanted to become a painter after his art teacher introduced him to artists such as Francis Bacon, Lucian Freud and David Hockney in school. He subsequently discovered Egon Schiele himself.

In creating the painting Me Ma Healing Me, for which he won the Zurich Portrait Prize, Fullam said he was "inspired by the kind of uncanny, suspended feeling one finds in the alchemist paintings of Leonora Carrington".

== Books ==
- — (2024). Fancy Situations Dead Present etc... Dublin: Kevin Kavanagh. ISBN 978-1-7392605-4-5.
