= Coláiste Cois Life =

School in Lucan, Ireland

Location
- Lucan; Ireland; 53.3496°N 6.4357°W

Information
- Established: 1997
- Chairperson: Anne-Marie D'arcy.
- Principal: Tomás Ó Donnagáin
- Gender: Mixed
- Enrollment: 771
- Colours: Blue and White
- Website: colaistecoislife.ie

Coláiste Cois Life is a mixed post-primary Gaelcholáiste (Irish language school) in Lucan, Ireland. The school is financed by resources from the Department of Education and voluntary donations, and is a member of the Dublin and Dún Laoghaire Education and Training Board. It was founded in 1997.

== History ==
Coláiste Cois Life was founded in 1997 and occupied a number of prefabricated buildings on Esker Manor. In 2006, a new two-story building was completed along with a new school campus on Castle Road. The new building still houses the school to this day and is located adjacent to the original site. The original site is now occupied by Gaelscoil Eiscir Riada, an all-Irish primary school.

In December 2013, a 10 m (33 ft) X 20 m (66 ft) section of the school's roof was torn off during. 100 km/h (62 mph) winds. The section of roof landed in the car park of a nearby primary school, Gaelscoil Naomh Pádraig. There were no injuries.

== Gaeltacht Leamhcáin ==
In the summer months, Gaeltacht Leamhcáin is based at Coláiste Cois Life offering 1–2 week Irish language courses for children between the ages of 9 and 12.

== School teams ==
- Boys' hurling and girls' camogie teams.
- Boys' and girls' Gaelic football.
- Boys' and girls' basketball teams.
- Debating teams.
- In 2019, the junior boys' Gaelic football team won the junior Dublin 'C' championship and reached the Leinster semifinal before losing to Portlaoise Community College.

== Rankings ==
In 2017, Coláiste Cois Life was ranked as the 40th best post-primary school in Ireland in a list by the Sunday Times. On the same list, the school ranked third out of all post-primary gaelcholáistí, (Note: Plural of Gaelcholáiste) and first out of all mixed gaelcholáistí.

== Notable past pupils ==
Conor McGregor – Mixed martial artist and boxer.

Síomha Ní Ruairc – Podcaster and television presenter.
