= List of female members of Dáil Éireann =

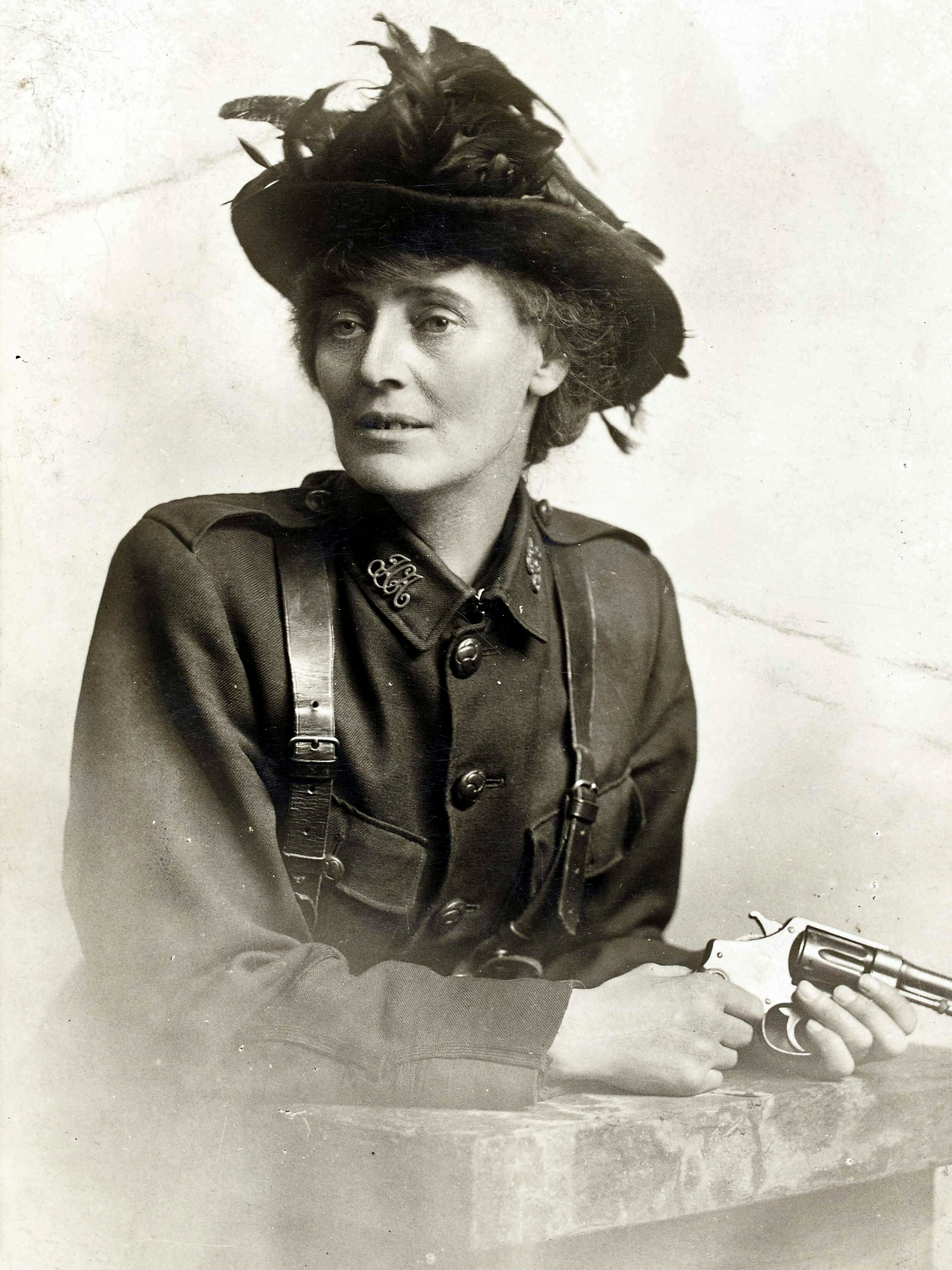
Constance Markievicz, the first woman elected to Dáil Éireann

This is a list of women Teachtaí Dála (TDs). It includes all women who have been elected to Dáil Éireann, the lower house of the Oireachtas, the bicameral parliament of Ireland.

== History ==
As of November 2024, a total of 151 women have been elected to the Dáil. The first woman TD was Constance Markievicz, elected in 1918 to the First Dáil, and she was joined by five other women in the Second Dáil. The number fell to one in the 6th Dáil, rose again and fell back to two in the 9th Dáil.

The 1981 general election to the 22nd Dáil saw the tally exceed ten for the first time, when six newly elected women brought the total to eleven. The arrival of nine newly elected women TDs in 1992 brought a total of 20 women to the 27th Dáil. 25 women were elected at the 2011 general election to the 31st Dáil. 35 women (22%) were elected to the 32nd Dáil in 2016.

== Women in Dáil Éireann ==
Denotes incumbent member of Dáil Éireann

	Name	Year (Note: Year of first election) (Note: b. stands for by-election)	Constituencies represented	Party represented	Age (Note: Age at first election)	Family
1	Constance Markievicz	1918	Dublin St Patrick's 1918–1921, Dublin South 1921–1922, 1923–1927 (Note: re-elected in June 1927, died in July)	Sinn Féin (Fianna Fáil from 1926)	50	
2	Kathleen Clarke	1921	Dublin Mid 1921–1922, June–Sept 1927	Sinn Féin (Fianna Fáil from 1926)	43	widow of Tom Clarke
2	Ada English	1921	NUI 1921–1922	Sinn Féin	46	
2	Mary MacSwiney	1921	Cork Borough 1921–1927 (June)	Sinn Féin	49	sister of Terence MacSwiney
2	Kathleen O'Callaghan	1921	Limerick City–Limerick East 1921–1923	Sinn Féin	33	widow of Michael O'Callaghan
2	Margaret Pearse	1921	Dublin County 1921–1922	Sinn Féin	64	mother of Patrick Pearse
7	Caitlín Brugha	1923	Waterford County 1923–1927 (Sept)	Sinn Féin	43	widow of Cathal Brugha
7	Margaret Collins-O'Driscoll	1923	Dublin North 1923–1933	Cumann na nGaedheal	45	sister of Michael Collins
7	Kathleen Lynn	1923	Dublin County 1923–1927 (June)	Sinn Féin	49	
10	Mary Reynolds	1932	Sligo–Leitrim 1932–1933, 1937–1961	Cumann na nGaedheal (Fine Gael from 1933)	42	widow of Patrick Reynolds
11	Helena Concannon	1933	NUI 1933–1937	Fianna Fáil	54	
11	Margaret Mary Pearse	1933	Dublin County 1933–1937	Fianna Fáil	55	sister of Patrick Pearse
11	Bridget Redmond	1933	Waterford 1933–1952	Cumann na nGaedheal (Fine Gael from 1933)	28	widow of William Redmond
14	Bridget Rice	1938	Monaghan 1938–1954	Fianna Fáil	53	widow of Eamon Rice
15	Mary Ryan	1944	Tipperary 1944–1948, Tipperary North 1948–1961	Fianna Fáil	46	widow of Martin Ryan
16	Honor Crowley	1945 b.	Kerry South 1945–1966	Fianna Fáil	42	widow of Frederick Crowley
17	Celia Lynch	1954	Dublin South-Central 1954–1961, Dublin North-Central 1961–1977	Fianna Fáil	46	widow of James B. Lynch
17	Maureen O'Carroll	1954	Dublin North-Central 1954–1957	Labour	41	
19	Kathleen O'Connor	1956 b.	Kerry North 1956–1957	Clann na Poblachta	21	daughter of Johnny Connor
20	Brigid Hogan-O'Higgins (Hogan to 1958)	1957	Galway South 1957–1961, Galway East 1961–1969, Clare–South Galway 1969–1977	Fine Gael	25	daughter of Patrick Hogan, married Michael O'Higgins
21	Sheila Galvin	1964 b.	Cork Borough 1964–1965	Fianna Fáil	49	widow of John Galvin
22	Joan Burke	1964 b.	Roscommon 1964–1969, Roscommon–Leitrim 1969–1981	Fine Gael	35	widow of James Burke
23	Eileen Desmond	1965 b.	Cork Mid 1965–1969, Cork South-Central 1973–1987	Labour	32	widow of Dan Desmond
24	Máire Geoghegan-Quinn	1975 b.	Galway West 1975–1997	Fianna Fáil	24	daughter of Johnny Geoghegan
25	Kit Ahern	1977	Kerry North 1977–1981	Fianna Fáil	50	
25	Síle de Valera	1977	Dublin County Mid 1977–1981, Clare 1987–2007	Fianna Fáil	22	granddaughter of Éamon de Valera
25	Eileen Lemass	1977	Dublin Ballyfermot 1977–1981, Dublin West 1981–1982, 1982–1987	Fianna Fáil	44	widow of Noel Lemass
28	Myra Barry	1979 b.	Cork North-East 1979–1981, Cork East 1981–1987	Fine Gael	22	daughter of Richard Barry
29	Carrie Acheson	1981	Tipperary South 1981–Feb. 1982	Fianna Fáil	46	sister of Tras Honan
29	Nuala Fennell	1981	Dublin South 1981–1987, 1989–1992	Fine Gael	45	
29	Mary Flaherty	1981	Dublin North-West 1981–1997	Fine Gael	28	wife of Alexis FitzGerald Jnr
29	Alice Glenn	1981	Dublin Central 1981–1982, 1982–1987	Fine Gael	58	
29	Mary Harney	1981	Dublin South-West 1981–2002, Dublin Mid-West 2002–2011	Fianna Fáil (Progressive Democrats 1985–2009) (Independent 2009–2011)	28	
29	Nora Owen	1981	Dublin North 1981–1987, 1989–2002	Fine Gael	36	grandniece of Michael Collins
29	Madeleine Taylor-Quinn (Taylor to 1982)	1981	Clare 1981–1982, 1982–1992	Fine Gael	30	daughter of Frank Taylor
36	Gemma Hussey	1982 (Feb)	Wicklow Feb. 1982–1989	Fine Gael	42	
36	Monica Barnes	1982 (Nov)	Dún Laoghaire Nov. 1982–1992, 1997–2002	Fine Gael	46	
36	Avril Doyle	1982 (Nov)	Wexford Nov. 1982–1987, 1992–1997	Fine Gael	33	daughter of Richard Belton
36	Mary O'Rourke	1982 (Nov)	Longford–Westmeath Nov. 1982–2002, 2007–2011, Westmeath 1992–2002	Fianna Fáil	45	sister of Brian Lenihan Snr
40	Anne Colley	1987	Dublin South 1987–1989	Progressive Democrats	35	daughter of George Colley
40	Geraldine Kennedy	1987	Dún Laoghaire 1987–1989	Progressive Democrats	35	
40	Mary Mooney	1987	Dublin South-Central 1987–1989	Fianna Fáil	28	
40	Máirín Quill	1987	Cork North-Central 1987–1997	Progressive Democrats	46	
40	Mary Coughlan	1987	Donegal South-West 1987–2011	Fianna Fáil	21	daughter of Cathal Coughlan
45	Theresa Ahearn	1989	Tipperary South 1989–2000	Fine Gael	38	
45	Mary Wallace	1989	Meath 1989–2007, Meath East 2007–2011	Fianna Fáil	30	
47	Niamh Bhreathnach	1992	Dún Laoghaire 1992–1997	Labour	47	
47	Joan Burton	1992	Dublin West 1992–1997, 2002–2020	Labour	43	
47	Eithne FitzGerald	1992	Dublin South 1992–1997	Labour	42	daughter-in-law of Garret FitzGerald
47	Frances Fitzgerald	1992	Dublin South-East 1992–2002, Dublin Mid-West 2011–2019	Fine Gael	42	
47	Helen Keogh	1992	Dún Laoghaire 1992–1997	Progressive Democrats	41	
47	Liz McManus	1992	Wicklow 1992–2011	Democratic Left (Labour Party from 1999)	45	
47	Breeda Moynihan-Cronin	1992	Kerry South 1992–2007	Labour	39	daughter of Michael Moynihan
47	Liz O'Donnell	1992	Dublin South 1992–2007	Progressive Democrats	36	
47	Róisín Shortall	1992	Dublin North-West 1992–2024	Labour (Independent 2012–2015) (Social Democrats from 2015)	38	
56	Kathleen Lynch	1994 b.	Cork North-Central 1994–1997, 2002–2016	Democratic Left (Labour Party from 1999)	41	
57	Mildred Fox	1995 b.	Wicklow 1995–2007	Independent	24	daughter of Johnny Fox
58	Cecilia Keaveney	1996 b.	Donegal North-East 1996–2007	Fianna Fáil	27	daughter of Paddy Keaveney
59	Deirdre Clune	1997	Cork South-Central 1997–2002, 2007–2011	Fine Gael	38	daughter of Peter Barry
59	Beverley Flynn (Cooper-Flynn until 2003)	1997	Mayo 1997–2011	Fianna Fáil (Independent 2001–2002, 2004–2008)	31	daughter of Pádraig Flynn
59	Mary Hanafin	1997	Dún Laoghaire 1997–2011	Fianna Fáil	38	daughter of Des Hanafin
59	Marian McGennis	1997	Dublin Central 1997–2002	Fianna Fáil	43	
59	Olivia Mitchell	1997	Dublin South 1997–2016	Fine Gael	49	
64	Jan O'Sullivan	1998 b.	Limerick East 1998–2011, Limerick City 2011–2020	Labour	47	
65	Mary Upton	1999 b.	Dublin South-Central 1999–2011	Labour	53	sister of Pat Upton
66	Olwyn Enright	2002	Laois–Offaly 2002–2011	Fine Gael	27	daughter of Tom Enright
66	Marian Harkin	2002	Sligo–Leitrim 2002–2007, 2020–	Independent	48	
66	Máire Hoctor	2002	Tipperary North 2002–2011	Fianna Fáil	38	
66	Fiona O'Malley	2002	Dún Laoghaire 2002–2007	Progressive Democrats	34	daughter of Desmond O'Malley
66	Mae Sexton	2002	Longford–Roscommon 2002–2007	Progressive Democrats	47	
71	Catherine Murphy	2005 b.	Kildare North 2005–2007, 2011–2024	Independent (Social Democrats from 2015)	51	
72	Áine Brady	2007	Kildare North 2007–2011	Fianna Fáil	52	daughter of Michael F. Kitt
72	Catherine Byrne	2007	Dublin South-Central 2007–2020	Fine Gael	51	
72	Margaret Conlon	2007	Cavan–Monaghan 2007–2011	Fianna Fáil	39	
72	Lucinda Creighton	2007	Dublin South-East 2007–2016	Fine Gael (Independent 2013–2015) (Renua 2015–2016)	27	
72	Joanna Tuffy	2007	Dublin Mid-West 2007–2016	Labour	42	
72	Mary White	2007	Carlow–Kilkenny 2007–2011	Green	58	
78	Maureen O'Sullivan	2009 b.	Dublin Central 2009–2020	Independent	58	
79	Áine Collins	2011	Cork North-West 2011–2016	Fine Gael	41	
79	Joan Collins	2011	Dublin South-Central 2011–2024	People Before Profit (Independents 4 Change 2016–2020) (Right to Change from 2020)	49	
79	Ciara Conway	2011	Waterford 2011–2016	Labour	30	
79	Marcella Corcoran Kennedy	2011	Laois–Offaly 2011–2016, Offaly 2016–2020	Fine Gael	48	
79	Clare Daly	2011	Dublin North 2011–2016, Dublin Fingal 2016–2019	Socialist Party (Independent 2012–2016) (Independents 4 Change 2016–2019)	42	
79	Regina Doherty	2011	Meath East 2011–2020	Fine Gael	40	
79	Anne Ferris	2011	Wicklow 2011–2016	Labour	56	
79	Heather Humphreys	2011	Cavan–Monaghan 2011–2024	Fine Gael	47	
79	Mary Lou McDonald	2011	Dublin Central 2011–	Sinn Féin	41	
79	Nicky McFadden	2011	Longford–Westmeath 2011–2014	Fine Gael	39	
79	Sandra McLellan	2011	Cork East 2011–2016	Sinn Féin	49	
79	Mary Mitchell O'Connor	2011	Dún Laoghaire 2011–2020	Fine Gael	51	
79	Michelle Mulherin	2011	Mayo 2011–2016	Fine Gael	39	
79	Ann Phelan	2011	Carlow–Kilkenny 2011–2016	Labour	49	
93	Helen McEntee	2013 b.	Meath East 2013–	Fine Gael	26	daughter of Shane McEntee
94	Ruth Coppinger	2014 b.	Dublin West 2014–2020, 2024–	Socialist Party (PBP–Solidarity from 2024)	47	
94	Gabrielle McFadden	2014 b.	Longford–Westmeath 2014–2016	Fine Gael	47	sister of Nicky McFadden
96	Maria Bailey	2016	Dún Laoghaire 2016–2020	Fine Gael	39	
96	Mary Butler	2016	Waterford 2016–	Fianna Fáil	53	
96	Lisa Chambers	2016	Mayo 2016–2020	Fianna Fáil	29	niece of Frank Chambers
96	Catherine Connolly	2016	Galway West 2016–2025	Independent	58	
96	Kathleen Funchion	2016	Carlow–Kilkenny 2016–2024	Sinn Féin	34	
96	Josepha Madigan	2016	Dublin Rathdown 2016–2024	Fine Gael	45	
96	Catherine Martin	2016	Dublin Rathdown 2016–2024	Green	43	
96	Denise Mitchell	2016	Dublin Bay North 2016–	Sinn Féin	39	
96	Imelda Munster	2016	Louth 2016–2024	Sinn Féin	48	
96	Margaret Murphy O'Mahony	2016	Cork South-West 2016–2020	Fianna Fáil	46	
96	Hildegarde Naughton	2016	Galway West 2016–	Fine Gael	38	
96	Carol Nolan	2016	Offaly 2016–2020, Laois–Offaly 2020–	Sinn Féin (Independent from 2018)	37	
96	Kate O'Connell	2016	Dublin Bay South 2016–2020	Fine Gael	36	
96	Fiona O'Loughlin	2016	Kildare South 2016–2020	Fianna Fáil	50	
96	Louise O'Reilly	2016	Dublin Fingal 2016–2024, Dublin Fingal West 2024–	Sinn Féin	36	
96	Anne Rabbitte	2016	Galway East 2016–2024	Fianna Fáil	45	
96	Bríd Smith	2016	Dublin South-Central 2016–2024	AAA–PBP (PBP–Solidarity from 2017)	54	
96	Niamh Smyth	2016	Cavan–Monaghan 2016–	Fianna Fáil	37	grandniece of Patrick Smith
96	Katherine Zappone	2016	Dublin South-West 2016–2020	Independent	62	
115	Holly Cairns	2020	Cork South-West 2020–	Social Democrats	30	
115	Jennifer Carroll MacNeill	2020	Dún Laoghaire 2020–	Fine Gael	39	
115	Sorca Clarke	2020	Longford–Westmeath 2020–	Sinn Féin	42	
115	Rose Conway-Walsh	2020	Mayo 2020–	Sinn Féin	50	
115	Réada Cronin	2020	Kildare North 2020–	Sinn Féin	55	
115	Mairéad Farrell	2020	Galway West 2020–	Sinn Féin	30	
115	Norma Foley	2020	Kerry 2020–	Fianna Fáil	49–50	daughter of Denis Foley
115	Emer Higgins	2020	Dublin Mid-West 2020–	Fine Gael	34–35	
115	Neasa Hourigan	2020	Dublin Central 2020–2024	Green	39	
115	Claire Kerrane	2020	Roscommon–Galway 2020–	Sinn Féin	27	
115	Jennifer Murnane O'Connor	2020	Carlow–Kilkenny 2020–	Fianna Fáil	53	
115	Verona Murphy	2020	Wexford 2020–	Independent	48–49	
115	Patricia Ryan	2020	Kildare South 2020–2024	Sinn Féin	50	
115	Pauline Tully	2020	Cavan–Monaghan 2020–2024	Sinn Féin	48	
115	Jennifer Whitmore	2020	Wicklow 2020–	Social Democrats	46	
115	Violet-Anne Wynne	2020	Clare 2020–2024	Sinn Féin	32	
131	Ivana Bacik	2021 b.	Dublin Bay South 2021–	Labour	53	
132	Catherine Ardagh	2024	Dublin South-Central 2024–	Fianna Fáil	42	daughter of Seán Ardagh
132	Cathy Bennett	2024	Cavan–Monaghan 2024–	Sinn Féin	50	
132	Grace Boland	2024	Dublin Fingal West 2024–	Fine Gael	47	daughter of John Boland
132	Paula Butterly	2024	Louth 2024–	Fine Gael		
132	Joanna Byrne	2024	Louth 2024–	Sinn Féin		
132	Catherine Callaghan	2024	Carlow–Kilkenny 2024–	Fine Gael	49	
132	Jen Cummins	2024	Dublin South-Central 2024–	Social Democrats	49	
132	Emer Currie	2024	Dublin West 2024–	Fine Gael	45	daughter of Austin Currie
132	Aisling Dempsey	2024	Meath West 2024–	Fianna Fáil		daughter of Noel Dempsey
132	Máire Devine	2024	Dublin South-Central 2024–	Sinn Féin	52	
132	Sinéad Gibney	2024	Dublin Rathdown 2024–	Social Democrats	47	
132	Ann Graves	2024	Dublin Fingal East 2024–	Sinn Féin		
132	Keira Keogh	2024	Mayo 2024–	Fine Gael	39	
132	Donna McGettigan	2024	Clare 2024–	Sinn Féin	52	
132	Erin McGreehan	2024	Louth 2024–	Fianna Fáil	42	
132	Natasha Newsome Drennan	2024	Carlow–Kilkenny 2024–	Sinn Féin	48	
132	Shónagh Ní Raghallaigh	2024	Kildare South 2024–	Sinn Féin	41	
132	Maeve O'Connell	2024	Dublin Rathdown 2024–	Fine Gael		
132	Marie Sherlock	2024	Dublin Central 2024–	Labour		
132	Gillian Toole	2024	Meath East 2024–	Independent		

== Number of women elected in each Dáil ==
Dáil	Election	Number elected	By-elections
1st	1918	1 / 105 (0.9%)	0
2nd	1921	6 / 128 (4.7%)	0
3rd	1922	2 / 128 (1.5%)	0
4th	1923	5 / 153 (3.3%)	0
5th	1927 (Jun)	4 / 153 (2.6%)	0
6th	1927 (Sep)	1 / 153 (0.6%)	0
7th	1932	2 / 153 (1.3%)	0
8th	1933	3 / 153 (1.9%)	0
9th	1937	2 / 138 (1.4%)	0
10th	1938	3 / 138 (2.2%)	0
11th	1943	3 / 138 (2.2%)	0
12th	1944	4 / 138 (2.9%)	0
13th	1948	5 / 147 (3.4%)	0
14th	1951	5 / 147 (3.4%)	0
15th	1954	5 / 147 (3.4%)	1
16th	1957	4 / 147 (2.7%)	0
17th	1961	3 / 144 (2.1%)	3
18th	1965	5 / 144 (3.5%)	0
19th	1969	3 / 144 (2.1%)	0
20th	1973	4 / 144 (2.7%)	1
21st	1977	6 / 148 (4.0%)	1
22nd	1981	11 / 166 (6.6%)	0
23rd	1982 (Feb)	8 / 166 (4.8%)	0
24th	1982 (Nov)	14 / 166 (8.4%)	0
25th	1987	14 / 166 (8.4%)	0
26th	1989	13 / 166 (7.8%)	0
27th	1992	20 / 166 (12.0%)	3
28th	1997	20 / 166 (12.0%)	2
29th	2002	22 / 166 (13.2%)	1
30th	2007	22 / 166 (13.2%)	1
31st	2011	25 / 166 (15.1%)	3
32nd	2016	35 / 158 (22.1%)	0
33rd	2020	36 / 160 (22.5%)	1
34th	2024	44 / 174 (25.3%)	0

== See also ==
- Families in the Oireachtas
- List of female members of Seanad Éireann
- Records of members of the Oireachtas

== Sources and external links ==
- McNamara, Maedhbh; Mooney, Paschal (2000). Women in Parliament: Ireland 1918–2000. Dublin: Wolfhound Press. ISBN 0-86327-759-4.
- McNamara, Maedhbh (2020). A Woman's Place is in the Cabinet 1919–2019. Drogheda: Sea Dog Books. ISBN 978-1-913275-06-8.
- Oireachtas Members Database
- ElectionsIreland.org
