= 34th Dáil =

TDs in office from 2024

←	33rd Dáil

Overview
- Legislative body: Dáil Éireann
- Jurisdiction: Ireland
- Meeting place: Leinster House
- Term: 18 December 2024 – present
- Election: 2024 general election
- Government: 35th government of Ireland (2025–present)
- Members: 174
- Ceann Comhairle: Verona Murphy
- Leas-Cheann Comhairle: John McGuinness
- Taoiseach: Micheál Martin
- Tánaiste: Simon Harris
- Chief Whip: Mary Butler
- Leader of the Opposition: Mary Lou McDonald

Sessions
- 1st: 18 December 2024 – 17 July 2025
- 2nd: 17 September 2025 – 16 July 2026
- 3rd: 16 September 2026 –

The 34th Dáil was elected at the 2024 general election on 29 November 2024 and first met on 18 December 2024. The members of Dáil Éireann, the house of representatives of the Oireachtas (legislature) of Ireland, are known as TDs. It is sitting with the 27th Seanad as the Houses of the Oireachtas. There are 174 TDs in the 34th Dáil, an increase of 14 from the 33rd Dáil.

The 34th Dáil must be dissolved by the president at the request of the Taoiseach within five years of its first sitting. It has lasted 1 year, 297 days to date.

== Composition ==
- 35th government coalition parties (Note: 5 independents formed part of the government with Fianna Fáil and Fine Gael, until Michael Healy-Rae resigned from the government in April 2026, reducing it to 4.)

Party	Nov. 2024 (Note: Seats won at the 2024 general election.)	May. 2026 (Note: Composition of the Dáil following the election of Daniel Ennis and Seán Kyne.)	Change
Fianna Fáil	48	48	Steady
Sinn Féin	39	39	Steady
Fine Gael	38	38	Steady
Social Democrats	11	12	▲1
Labour	11	11	Steady
Independent Ireland	4	4	Steady
PBP–Solidarity	3	3	Steady
Aontú	2	2	Steady
Green	1	1	Steady
100% Redress	1	1	Steady
Independent	16	14	▼2
Ceann Comhairle	—N/a	1	▲1
Total	174		

=== Composition diagrams ===
Members of Dáil Éireann after the 2024 general election.

First formation of Dáil Éireann in February 2025.

Formation of Dáil Éireann as of 26 May 2026.

== Gender composition ==
The 2024 general election saw a record number of 246 female candidates standing for election across all 43 Dáil constituencies. This equated to 36% of all candidates. However, just 44 women TDs were elected to the 34th Dáil, representing 25.5% of the 174 elected members. Data from the Inter-Parliamentary Union described the Dáil as the "worst [parliamentary chamber] for gender diversity in western Europe". Although there have been statutory gender quotas for candidates seeking election to the Dáil since 2012, the number of women elected as TDs has only increased modestly since then.

Verona Murphy became the first female Ceann Comhairle in December 2024. In October 2025, Elaine Gunn became the first female Clerk of Dáil Éireann and Secretary General of the Houses of the Oireachtas Commission.

== Ceann Comhairle ==
- Ceann Comhairle: Verona Murphy
- Leas-Cheann Comhairle: John McGuinness

The first order of business of the 34th Dáil on 18 December 2024 was to elect a new Ceann Comhairle. Four candidates were nominated: John McGuinness (FF), Verona Murphy (Ind), Seán Ó Fearghaíl (FF), who had served as Ceann Comhairle in the 32nd and 33rd Dáil, and Aengus Ó Snodaigh (SF). Murphy was elected as Ceann Comhairle, the first woman to hold the role.

On 19 February 2025, the Clerk of the Dáil declared Aengus Ó Snodaigh (SF) and John McGuinness (FF) as validly nominated candidates for the position of Leas-Cheann Comhairle. McGuinness was elected by a vote of 96 to 66.

The 2025 Dáil speaking rights dispute culminated in calls from opposition leaders for Murphy to step down as Ceann Comhairle. On 26 March 2025, the leaders of Sinn Féin and the Labour Party expressed no confidence in Murphy's position, offering her "time to reflect" before considering a formal motion. On 1 April 2025, the government proposed a motion of confidence in Murphy, which was carried by a vote of 96 to 71, with 2 abstentions. It was the first time a vote of confidence had been held on the office of Ceann Comhairle.

== Political leadership ==
=== Government ===
- Taoiseach
  - Micheál Martin (23 January 2025 to date)
- Tánaiste
  - Simon Harris (23 January 2025 to date)
- Leader of Fianna Fáil
  - Micheál Martin (26 January 2011 to date)
- Leader of Fine Gael
  - Simon Harris (20 March 2024 to date)

=== Opposition ===
- Leader of Sinn Féin
  - Mary Lou McDonald (10 February 2018 to date)
- Leader of the Labour Party
  - Ivana Bacik (24 March 2022 to date)
- Leader of the Social Democrats
  - Holly Cairns (1 March 2023 to date)
- Leader of Aontú
  - Peadar Tóibín (28 January 2019 to date)
- Leader of Independent Ireland
  - Michael Collins (10 November 2023 to date)
- Leader of the Green Party
  - Roderic O'Gorman (18 June 2024 to date)

== List of TDs ==
Of the 174 TDs, over sixty were elected for the first time; 44 are women (25%) and 130 are men.

+: Elected for the first time at the 2024 general election.
‡: Previously served as member of the Dáil non-consecutively to the current consecutive terms of office.
#: Member of the 26th Seanad at time of election.
§: Returned automatically without standing for election as outgoing Ceann Comhairle, in accordance with Article 16.6 of the Constitution of Ireland.

Members of the 34th Dáil
Constituency	Name	Portrait	Party affiliation (Technical group)	Assumed office
Carlow–Kilkenny	Catherine Callaghan		Fine Gael	18 December 2024
Carlow–Kilkenny	Peter "Chap" Cleere		Fianna Fáil	18 December 2024
Carlow–Kilkenny	John McGuinness		Fianna Fáil	26 June 1997
Carlow–Kilkenny	Jennifer Murnane O'Connor		Fianna Fáil	20 February 2020
Carlow–Kilkenny	Natasha Newsome Drennan		Sinn Féin	18 December 2024
Cavan–Monaghan	Cathy Bennett		Sinn Féin	18 December 2024
Cavan–Monaghan	Matt Carthy		Sinn Féin	20 February 2020
Cavan–Monaghan	David Maxwell		Fine Gael	18 December 2024
Cavan–Monaghan	Brendan Smith		Fianna Fáil	14 December 1992
Cavan–Monaghan	Niamh Smyth		Fianna Fáil	10 March 2016
Clare	Joe Cooney		Fine Gael	18 December 2024
Clare	Cathal Crowe		Fianna Fáil	20 February 2020
Clare	Timmy Dooley		Fianna Fáil	18 December 2024
Clare	Donna McGettigan		Sinn Féin	18 December 2024
Cork East	Pat Buckley		Sinn Féin	10 March 2016
Cork East	Noel McCarthy		Fine Gael	18 December 2024
Cork East	James O'Connor		Fianna Fáil	20 February 2020
Cork East	Liam Quaide		Social Democrats	18 December 2024
Cork North-Central	Colm Burke		Fine Gael	20 February 2020
Cork North-Central	Thomas Gould		Sinn Féin	20 February 2020
Cork North-Central	Eoghan Kenny		Labour	18 December 2024
Cork North-Central	Ken O'Flynn		Independent Ireland (Independent Group)	18 December 2024
Cork North-Central	Pádraig O'Sullivan		Fianna Fáil	3 December 2019
Cork North-West	Aindrias Moynihan		Fianna Fáil	10 March 2016
Cork North-West	Michael Moynihan		Fianna Fáil	26 June 1997
Cork North-West	John Paul O'Shea		Fine Gael	18 December 2024
Cork South-Central	Jerry Buttimer		Fine Gael	18 December 2024
Cork South-Central	Micheál Martin		Fianna Fáil	29 June 1989
Cork South-Central	Séamus McGrath		Fianna Fáil	18 December 2024
Cork South-Central	Donnchadh Ó Laoghaire		Sinn Féin	10 March 2016
Cork South-Central	Pádraig Rice		Social Democrats	18 December 2024
Cork South-West	Holly Cairns		Social Democrats	20 February 2020
Cork South-West	Michael Collins		Independent Ireland (Independent Group)	10 March 2016
Cork South-West	Christopher O'Sullivan		Fianna Fáil	20 February 2020
Donegal	Pearse Doherty		Sinn Féin	30 November 2010
Donegal	Pat "the Cope" Gallagher		Fianna Fáil	18 December 2024
Donegal	Pádraig Mac Lochlainn		Sinn Féin	20 February 2020
Donegal	Charlie McConalogue		Fianna Fáil	9 March 2011
Donegal	Charles Ward		100% Redress (Independents & Smaller Parties Group)	18 December 2024
Dublin Bay North	Tom Brabazon		Fianna Fáil	18 December 2024
Dublin Bay North	Barry Heneghan		Independent (Regional Independent Group)	18 December 2024
Dublin Bay North	Denise Mitchell		Sinn Féin	10 March 2016
Dublin Bay North	Cian O'Callaghan		Social Democrats	20 February 2020
Dublin Bay North	Naoise Ó Muirí		Fine Gael	18 December 2024
Dublin Bay South	Ivana Bacik		Labour	13 July 2021
Dublin Bay South	James Geoghegan		Fine Gael	18 December 2024
Dublin Bay South	Eoin Hayes		Social Democrats (2024 election; since 25 Jul. 2025)	18 December 2024
Dublin Bay South	Eoin Hayes		Independent (10 Dec. 2024 – 25 Jul. 2025)	18 December 2024
Dublin Bay South	Jim O'Callaghan		Fianna Fáil	10 March 2016
Dublin Central	Paschal Donohoe		Fine Gael	9 March 2011
Dublin Central	Paschal Donohoe		Resigned 21 Nov. 2025	9 March 2011
Dublin Central	Daniel Ennis		2026 Dublin Central by-election	24 May 2026
Dublin Central	Daniel Ennis		Social Democrats	24 May 2026
Dublin Central	Gary Gannon		Social Democrats	20 February 2020
Dublin Central	Mary Lou McDonald		Sinn Féin	9 March 2011
Dublin Central	Marie Sherlock		Labour	18 December 2024
Dublin Fingal East	Ann Graves		Sinn Féin	18 December 2024
Dublin Fingal East	Darragh O'Brien		Fianna Fáil	10 March 2016
Dublin Fingal East	Duncan Smith		Labour	20 February 2020
Dublin Fingal West	Grace Boland		Fine Gael	18 December 2024
Dublin Fingal West	Robert O'Donoghue		Labour	18 December 2024
Dublin Fingal West	Louise O'Reilly		Sinn Féin	10 March 2016
Dublin Mid-West	Paul Gogarty		Independent (Independent Group)	18 December 2024
Dublin Mid-West	Emer Higgins		Fine Gael	20 February 2020
Dublin Mid-West	Shane Moynihan		Fianna Fáil	18 December 2024
Dublin Mid-West	Eoin Ó Broin		Sinn Féin	10 March 2016
Dublin Mid-West	Mark Ward		Sinn Féin	3 December 2019
Dublin North-West	Dessie Ellis		Sinn Féin	9 March 2011
Dublin North-West	Rory Hearne		Social Democrats	18 December 2024
Dublin North-West	Paul McAuliffe		Fianna Fáil	20 February 2020
Dublin Rathdown	Shay Brennan		Fianna Fáil	18 December 2024
Dublin Rathdown	Sinéad Gibney		Social Democrats	18 December 2024
Dublin Rathdown	Maeve O'Connell		Fine Gael	18 December 2024
Dublin Rathdown	Neale Richmond		Fine Gael	20 February 2020
Dublin South-Central	Catherine Ardagh		Fianna Fáil	18 December 2024
Dublin South-Central	Jen Cummins		Social Democrats	18 December 2024
Dublin South-Central	Máire Devine		Sinn Féin	18 December 2024
Dublin South-Central	Aengus Ó Snodaigh		Sinn Féin	6 June 2002
Dublin South-West	Ciarán Ahern		Labour	18 December 2024
Dublin South-West	Colm Brophy		Fine Gael	10 March 2016
Dublin South-West	Seán Crowe		Sinn Féin	9 March 2011
Dublin South-West	John Lahart		Fianna Fáil	10 March 2016
Dublin South-West	Paul Murphy		People Before Profit–Solidarity (Independents & Smaller Parties Group)	14 October 2014
Dublin West	Jack Chambers		Fianna Fáil	10 March 2016
Dublin West	Ruth Coppinger		People Before Profit–Solidarity (Independents & Smaller Parties Group)	18 December 2024
Dublin West	Emer Currie		Fine Gael	18 December 2024
Dublin West	Paul Donnelly		Sinn Féin	20 February 2020
Dublin West	Roderic O'Gorman		Green Party (Independents & Smaller Parties Group)	20 February 2020
Dún Laoghaire	Richard Boyd Barrett		People Before Profit–Solidarity (Independents & Smaller Parties Group)	9 March 2011
Dún Laoghaire	Jennifer Carroll MacNeill		Fine Gael	20 February 2020
Dún Laoghaire	Cormac Devlin		Fianna Fáil	20 February 2020
Dún Laoghaire	Barry Ward		Fine Gael	18 December 2024
Galway East	Seán Canney		Independent (Regional Independent Group)	10 March 2016
Galway East	Albert Dolan		Fianna Fáil	18 December 2024
Galway East	Louis O'Hara		Sinn Féin	18 December 2024
Galway East	Peter Roche		Fine Gael	18 December 2024
Galway West	Catherine Connolly		Independent (Independents & Smaller Parties Group)	10 March 2016
Galway West	Catherine Connolly		Elected President of Ireland in 2025	10 March 2016
Galway West	Seán Kyne		2026 Galway West by-election	24 May 2026
Galway West	Seán Kyne		Fine Gael	24 May 2026
Galway West	John Connolly		Fianna Fáil	18 December 2024
Galway West	Mairéad Farrell		Sinn Féin	20 February 2020
Galway West	Noel Grealish		Independent (Regional Independent Group)	6 June 2002
Galway West	Hildegarde Naughton		Fine Gael	10 March 2016
Kerry	Michael Cahill		Fianna Fáil	18 December 2024
Kerry	Pa Daly		Sinn Féin	20 February 2020
Kerry	Norma Foley		Fianna Fáil	20 February 2020
Kerry	Danny Healy-Rae		Independent (Regional Independent Group)	10 March 2016
Kerry	Michael Healy-Rae		Independent (Regional Independent Group)	9 March 2011
Kildare North	Réada Cronin		Sinn Féin	20 February 2020
Kildare North	Aidan Farrelly		Social Democrats	18 December 2024
Kildare North	James Lawless		Fianna Fáil	10 March 2016
Kildare North	Joe Neville		Fine Gael	18 December 2024
Kildare North	Naoise Ó Cearúil		Fianna Fáil	18 December 2024
Kildare South	Martin Heydon		Fine Gael	9 March 2011
Kildare South	Shónagh Ní Raghallaigh		Sinn Féin	18 December 2024
Kildare South	Seán Ó Fearghaíl		Fianna Fáil	6 June 2002
Kildare South	Mark Wall		Labour	18 December 2024
Laois	William Aird		Fine Gael	18 December 2024
Laois	Seán Fleming		Fianna Fáil	26 June 1997
Laois	Brian Stanley		Independent (Independents & Smaller Parties Group)	9 March 2011
Limerick City	Willie O'Dea		Fianna Fáil	9 March 1982
Limerick City	Kieran O'Donnell		Fine Gael	20 February 2020
Limerick City	Maurice Quinlivan		Sinn Féin	10 March 2016
Limerick City	Conor Sheehan		Labour	18 December 2024
Limerick County	Niall Collins		Fianna Fáil	14 June 2007
Limerick County	Richard O'Donoghue		Independent Ireland (Independent Group)	20 February 2020
Limerick County	Patrick O'Donovan		Fine Gael	9 March 2011
Longford–Westmeath	Peter Burke		Fine Gael	10 March 2016
Longford–Westmeath	Micheál Carrigy		Fine Gael	18 December 2024
Longford–Westmeath	Sorca Clarke		Sinn Féin	20 February 2020
Longford–Westmeath	Kevin "Boxer" Moran		Independent (Regional Independent Group)	18 December 2024
Longford–Westmeath	Robert Troy		Fianna Fáil	9 March 2011
Louth	Paula Butterly		Fine Gael	18 December 2024
Louth	Joanna Byrne		Sinn Féin	18 December 2024
Louth	Erin McGreehan		Fianna Fáil	18 December 2024
Louth	Ged Nash		Labour	20 February 2020
Louth	Ruairí Ó Murchú		Sinn Féin	20 February 2020
Mayo	Dara Calleary		Fianna Fáil	14 June 2007
Mayo	Rose Conway-Walsh		Sinn Féin	20 February 2020
Mayo	Alan Dillon		Fine Gael	20 February 2020
Mayo	Keira Keogh		Fine Gael	18 December 2024
Mayo	Paul Lawless		Aontú (Independent Group)	18 December 2024
Meath East	Thomas Byrne		Fianna Fáil	10 March 2016
Meath East	Helen McEntee		Fine Gael	16 April 2013
Meath East	Darren O'Rourke		Sinn Féin	20 February 2020
Meath East	Gillian Toole		Independent (Regional Independent Group)	18 December 2024
Meath West	Aisling Dempsey		Fianna Fáil	18 December 2024
Meath West	Johnny Guirke		Sinn Féin	20 February 2020
Meath West	Peadar Tóibín		Aontú (Independent Group)	9 March 2011
Offaly	John Clendennen		Fine Gael	18 December 2024
Offaly	Tony McCormack		Fianna Fáil	18 December 2024
Offaly	Carol Nolan		Independent (Regional Independent Group)	10 March 2016
Roscommon–Galway	Martin Daly		Fianna Fáil	18 December 2024
Roscommon–Galway	Michael Fitzmaurice		Independent Ireland (Independent Group)	14 October 2014
Roscommon–Galway	Claire Kerrane		Sinn Féin	20 February 2020
Sligo–Leitrim	Frank Feighan		Fine Gael	20 February 2020
Sligo–Leitrim	Marian Harkin		Independent (Regional Independent Group)	20 February 2020
Sligo–Leitrim	Martin Kenny		Sinn Féin	10 March 2016
Sligo–Leitrim	Eamon Scanlon		Fianna Fáil	18 December 2024
Tipperary North	Alan Kelly		Labour	9 March 2011
Tipperary North	Michael Lowry		Independent (Regional Independent Group)	10 March 1987
Tipperary North	Ryan O'Meara		Fianna Fáil	18 December 2024
Tipperary South	Séamus Healy		Independent (Independents & Smaller Parties Group)	18 December 2024
Tipperary South	Mattie McGrath		Independent	14 June 2007
Tipperary South	Michael Murphy		Fine Gael	18 December 2024
Waterford	Mary Butler		Fianna Fáil	10 March 2016
Waterford	David Cullinane		Sinn Féin	10 March 2016
Waterford	John Cummins		Fine Gael	18 December 2024
Waterford	Conor D. McGuinness		Sinn Féin	18 December 2024
Wexford	James Browne		Fianna Fáil	10 March 2016
Wexford	George Lawlor		Labour	18 December 2024
Wexford	Verona Murphy		Independent (2024 election)	20 February 2020
Wexford	Verona Murphy		Ceann Comhairle (since 18 Dec. 2024)	20 February 2020
Wexford	Johnny Mythen		Sinn Féin	20 February 2020
Wicklow–Wexford	Brian Brennan		Fine Gael	18 December 2024
Wicklow–Wexford	Malcolm Byrne		Fianna Fáil	18 December 2024
Wicklow–Wexford	Fionntán Ó Súilleabháin		Sinn Féin	18 December 2024
Wicklow	John Brady		Sinn Féin	10 March 2016
Wicklow	Simon Harris		Fine Gael	9 March 2011
Wicklow	Edward Timmins		Fine Gael	18 December 2024
Wicklow	Jennifer Whitmore		Social Democrats	20 February 2020

== Technical groups ==
=== Independent Group ===
On 7 December, three independent TDs formed a technical group with Independent Ireland TDs called the Independent Group. On 22 January 2025, after leaving the Regional Independent Group due to a disagreement over speaking rights, Aontú stated that they had joined the Independent group.

Affiliation	Name	Constituency
Independent	Paul Gogarty	Dublin Mid-West
Independent Ireland (4)	Michael Collins	Cork South-West
Independent Ireland (4)	Michael Fitzmaurice	Roscommon–Galway
Independent Ireland (4)	Richard O'Donoghue	Limerick County
Independent Ireland (4)	Ken O'Flynn	Cork North-Central
Aontú (2)	Peadar Tóibín	Meath West
Aontú (2)	Paul Lawless	Mayo

=== Independents and Smaller Parties Group ===
On 11 December, a technical group was created between three independent TDs, People Before Profit–Solidarity, and 100% Redress. Green Party leader and sole TD Roderic O'Gorman joined the group on 23 January 2025 on the appointment of the new government, whereon he vacated his ministerial post. During her term in the 34th Dáil, Catherine Connolly was a member of the group, before her election as President.

Affiliation	Name	Constituency
Independent (3)	Catherine Connolly	Galway West
Independent (3)	Séamus Healy	Tipperary South
Independent (3)	Brian Stanley	Laois
People Before Profit–Solidarity (3)	Ruth Coppinger	Dublin West
People Before Profit–Solidarity (3)	Richard Boyd Barrett	Dún Laoghaire
People Before Profit–Solidarity (3)	Paul Murphy	Dublin South-West
100% Redress	Charles Ward	Donegal
Green Party	Roderic O'Gorman	Dublin West

=== Former group ===
==== Regional Independent Group ====
On 4 December, Independent TDs Seán Canney, Noel Grealish, Marian Harkin, Barry Heneghan, Michael Lowry, Kevin "Boxer" Moran, Verona Murphy and Gillian Toole formed a technical group called the Regional Independent Group to negotiate the formation of a government, and appointed Michael Lowry to lead the negotiations. Both Aontú TDs and Carol Nolan later joined the group but were not part of the negotiations. Murphy was required to leave on her election as Ceann Comhairle. Mattie McGrath joined the group later in January 2025. On 22 January 2025, Aontú left the group amid a disagreement over speaking rights. As the group had negotiated five government posts, only six TDs would remain. On 23 January 2025, Ceann Comhairle Murphy confirmed that she would not recognise the group in the Dáil at a sitting to elect a new Taoiseach.

Affiliation	Name	Constituency
Independent (6)	Danny Healy-Rae	Kerry
Independent (6)	Barry Heneghan	Dublin Bay North
Independent (6)	Michael Lowry	Tipperary North
Independent (6)	Carol Nolan	Offaly
Independent (6)	Gillian Toole	Meath East
Independent (6)	Mattie McGrath	Tipperary South

== Changes ==
Date	Constituency	Loss	Gain	Note
10 December 2024	Dublin Bay South	Social Democrats	Independent	Eoin Hayes suspended from the party
18 December 2024	Wexford	Independent	Ceann Comhairle	Verona Murphy elected Ceann Comhairle
25 July 2025	Dublin Bay South	Independent	Social Democrats	Eoin Hayes readmitted to the Social Democrats parliamentary party
25 October 2025	Galway West	Independent		Election of Catherine Connolly as president of Ireland
21 November 2025	Dublin Central	Fine Gael		Resignation of Paschal Donohoe as a TD
22 May 2026	Dublin Central		Social Democrats	Daniel Ennis gains seat vacated by Donohoe
22 May 2026	Galway West		Fine Gael	Seán Kyne gains seat vacated by Connolly
