= Lorraine Clifford-Lee =

Irish politician (born 1981)

Senator Lorraine Clifford-Lee
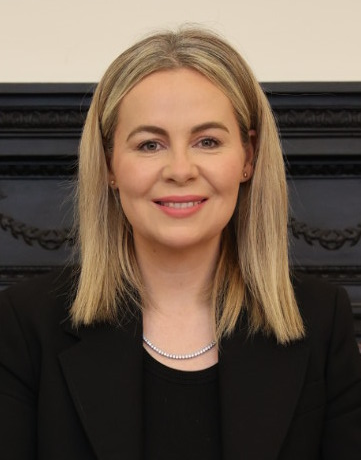
- Clifford-Lee in 2025

Senator
- Incumbent
- Assumed office 29 June 2020
- Constituency: Nominated by the Taoiseach
- In office 8 June 2016 – 29 June 2020
- Constituency: Cultural and Educational Panel

Personal details
- Born: Lorraine Clifford; 22 September 1981 (age 44) Waterford, Ireland
- Party: Fianna Fáil
- Spouse: John Lee (m. 2013)
- Children: 2
- Education: University College Cork

Lorraine Clifford-Lee (born 22 September 1981) is an Irish Fianna Fáil politician who has served as a senator since June 2020.

She was nominated by the Taoiseach to become a Senator in June 2020, having previously been selected from the 2016 to 2020 Cultural and Educational Panel.

== Early and personal life ==
Clifford-Lee was born in Waterford in 1981. She attended Our Lady of Mercy in Waterford and later studied at University College Cork where she became the Irish Officer on the Students Union.

She lives in Malahide with her husband John Lee and her daughter and son. Her husband, who is 10 years her senior, is the political editor of the Irish Mail on Sunday newspaper.

She is a self-employed solicitor and is a fluent Irish speaker.

== Political career ==
=== 2016 general election ===
At the 2014 local elections, she unsuccessfully contested the Pembroke-South Dock area of Dublin City Council. In 2015, she was selected, along with Darragh O'Brien, to be one of two Fianna Fáil candidates for the Dublin Fingal constituency in the 2016 general election. Clifford-Lee was selected to run in Dublin Fingal to ensure Fianna Fáil complied with gender quota rules.

The decision to add Clifford-Lee to the ticket was criticised by party insiders as tokenism and gratuitous. Darragh Butler, a long-time local Fianna Fáil councillor, stating "due to gender quotas we are being overlooked in favour of a candidate who has no track record, no history and up to now, no visibility in the constituency."

In the lead up to the election Clifford-Lee claimed that members of her team were intimidated by supporters of her running mate Darragh O'Brien while they were canvassing in Portmarnock. O'Brien denied knowledge of this but said that tempers can get a little frayed so close to polling day.

She was an unsuccessful candidate for Dublin Fingal polling 3,359 (5.6%) of first preferences and was eliminated on the ninth count, while her running mate Darragh O'Brien was elected on the first count, topping the poll.

On her election to the Seanad, she was appointed as the Fianna Fáil Seanad spokesperson for Justice, Children and Youth Affairs. In November 2018, she was appointed deputy leader of the opposition in the Seanad.

=== 2019 by-election ===
Clifford-Lee was a candidate in the 2019 Dublin Fingal by-election to fill the seat vacated following Independents 4 Change's Clare Daly election to the European Parliament in May 2019.

==== Racist tweets scandal ====
At the start of the campaign, multiple tweets emerged where Clifford-Lee appeared to make derogatory and xenophobic comments portraying negative and xenophobic attitudes towards foreigners, Irish Travellers as well as ableist and body shaming tweets about females.

She was forced to apologise the tweets from 2011. She refused calls to stand down as a candidate, claiming she was the victim of a smear campaign, while Fianna Fáil did not discipline her.

==== By-election result ====
There was a record low turn out for the constituency of 25.59% and the seat was won by the Green Party. Clifford-Lee received 18.5% of the first preference votes, coming second, and was eliminated on the final count.

=== Since 2020 ===
She was also an unsuccessful candidate for Dublin Fingal at the 2020 general election. She lost her seat at the 2020 Seanad election, but was returned to the Seanad after being nominated by the Taoiseach Micheál Martin, her party leader, in June 2020. She was the Fianna Fáil Seanad spokesperson on Health.

She was unsuccessful for the Dublin Fingal West constituency at the 2024 general election, being eliminated on the 5th count.

Clifford-Lee lost her seat at the 2025 Seanad election. She was nominated to the 27th Seanad on 7 February 2025. She was subsequently appointed the Cathaoirleach of the Committee on Members' Interests of the Seanad Éireann.
