= Dublin Fingal =

Dáil constituency (2016–2024)

- Former Dáil constituency
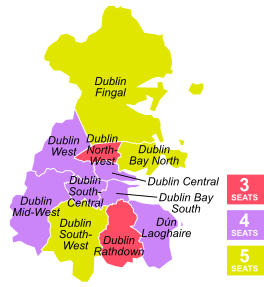
- Constituencies in County Dublin (2020); Dublin Fingal is at the top, coloured green.
- Dublin Fingal is outlined in red
- Major settlements: Balbriggan; Donabate; Lusk; Malahide; Portmarnock; Rush; Skerries; Swords

Former constituency
- Created: 2016
- Abolished: 2024
- Seats: 5
- Local government area: Fingal
- Created from: Dublin North (in whole); Dublin North-East (part); Dublin West (part)
- EP constituency: Dublin

Dublin Fingal was a parliamentary constituency which was represented in Dáil Éireann, the house of representatives of the Oireachtas (the legislature of Ireland), from 2016 to 2024. The constituency elected five deputies (Teachtaí Dála, commonly known as TDs) on the system of proportional representation by means of the single transferable vote (PR-STV).

== History and boundaries ==
The constituency was established by the Electoral (Amendment) (Dáil Constituencies) Act 2013. It incorporated all of the old Dublin North, Swords-Forrest and Kilsallaghan from Dublin West, and Balgriffin and Turnapin from Dublin North-East. The name Dublin Fingal for the constituency that became Dublin North had been proposed by John Boland in 1980.

The Electoral (Amendment) (Dáil Constituencies) Act 2017 defined the constituency as:

"In the county of Fingal the electoral divisions of:

Balbriggan Rural, Balbriggan Urban, Balgriffin, Ballyboghil, Balscadden, Clonmethan, Donabate, Garristown, Hollywood, Holmpatrick, Kilsallaghan, Kinsaley, Lusk, Malahide East, Malahide West, Portmarnock North, Portmarnock South, Rush, Skerries, Swords-Forrest, Swords-Glasmore, Swords-Lissenhall, Swords-Seatown, Swords Village;
and those parts of the electoral divisions of Airport, Dubber and Turnapin situated north of a line drawn along the Northern Cross Route (M50), passing in a clockwise direction around and excluding roundabout No. 3 at the junction of the Northern Cross Route (M50) with the M1 Motorway."

In August 2023, the Electoral Commission published its review of constituency boundaries in Ireland, which recommended that the constituency of Dublin Fingal be abolished, with the creation of two new three-seat constituencies: Dublin Fingal East and Dublin Fingal West. Each new constituency would elect 3 deputies. These changes commenced at the 2024 general election under the Electoral (Amendment) Act 2023.

== TDs ==
Teachtaí Dála (TDs) for Dublin Fingal 2016–2024
Key to parties: FF = Fianna Fáil; FG = Fine Gael; GP = Green; I4C = Inds. 4 Change; Lab = Labour; SF = Sinn Féin
Dáil	Election	Deputy (Party)	Deputy (Party)	Deputy (Party)	Deputy (Party)	Deputy (Party)
32nd	2016	Louise O'Reilly (SF)	Clare Daly (I4C)	Brendan Ryan (Lab)	Darragh O'Brien (FF)	Alan Farrell (FG)
32nd	2019 by-election	Louise O'Reilly (SF)	Joe O'Brien (GP)	Brendan Ryan (Lab)	Darragh O'Brien (FF)	Alan Farrell (FG)
33rd	2020	Louise O'Reilly (SF)	Joe O'Brien (GP)	Duncan Smith (Lab)	Darragh O'Brien (FF)	Alan Farrell (FG)
34th	2024	Constituency abolished. See Dublin Fingal East and Dublin Fingal West.				

Note: The columns in this table are used only for presentational purposes, and no significance should be attached to the order of columns. For details of the order in which seats were won at each election, see the detailed results of that election.

== Elections ==
*: Outgoing TD

=== 2020 general election ===
2020 general election: Dublin Fingal
Party	Candidate	FPv%	Count											
Party	Candidate	FPv%	1	2	3	4	5	6	7	8	9	10	11	12
Sinn Féin	Louise O'Reilly	24.9	15,792											
Green	Joe O'Brien	13.2	8,400	9,067	9,104	9,181	9,289	9,428	9,680	10,720				
Fianna Fáil	Darragh O'Brien	15.9	10,111	10,306	10,323	10,354	10,365	10,503	10,530	10,652				
Fine Gael	Alan Farrell	9.8	6,213	6,278	6,283	6,312	6,329	6,385	6,406	6,492	8,732	9,754	10,577	
Labour	Duncan Smith	7.1	4,513	4,898	4,936	4,988	5,052	5,138	5,222	5,691	6,126	7,135	8,258	8,340
Inds. 4 Change	Dean Mulligan	4.0	2,529	3,700	3,762	3,882	3,985	4,202	4,979	5,862	5,972	6,447	8,088	8,152
Independent	Tony Murphy	5.7	3,622	4,135	4,183	4,262	4,347	4,768	4,920	5,133	5,346	5,838		
Fianna Fáil	Lorraine Clifford-Lee	5.6	3,523	3,668	3,681	3,732	3,748	3,841	3,868	4,020	4,275			
Fine Gael	James Reilly	5.2	3,280	3,347	3,366	3,377	3,403	3,433	3,450	3,503				
Social Democrats	Paul Mulville	3.5	2,206	2,628	2,656	2,729	2,804	2,879	3,226					
Solidarity–PBP	Terry Kelleher (Note: Kelleher was a member of Solidarity.)	1.1	674	1,391	1,424	1,513	1,800	1,883						
Independent	Gemma O'Doherty (Note: O'Doherty contested this election as member of Anti Corruption Ireland. It is not registered as a political party, so candidates appeared on the ballot as non-party.)	2.0	1,252	1,462	1,538	1,573	1,614							
Solidarity–PBP	John Uwhumiakpor (Note: Uwhumiakpor was a member of People Before Profit.)	0.8	487	845	875	895								
Independent	Sandra Sweetman	0.4	259	376										
United People	Alistair Smith	0.1	43	97										
Electorate: 101,045 Valid: 63,440 Spoilt: 451 (0.7%) Quota: 10,574 Turnout: 63,891 (63.2%)

=== 2019 by-election ===
A by-election was held in the constituency on 29 November 2019, to fill the seat vacated by Clare Daly on her election to the European Parliament in May 2019.

2019 by-election: Dublin Fingal
Party	Candidate	FPv%	Count							
Party	Candidate	FPv%	1	2	3	4	5	6	7	8
Green	Joe O'Brien	22.9	5,744	5,837	5,965	6,091	6,784	7,984	9,183	12,315
Fianna Fáil	Lorraine Clifford-Lee	18.5	4,631	4,672	4,766	4,929	5,252	5,648	6,547	7,754
Labour	Duncan Smith	15.2	3,821	3,866	3,926	4,008	4,347	4,999	6,300	
Fine Gael	James Reilly	14.8	3,707	3,753	3,803	3,882	3,992	4,200		
Inds. 4 Change	Dean Mulligan	10.2	2,550	2,606	2,745	2,909	3,754			
Sinn Féin	Ann Graves	5.3	1,327	1,361	1,402	1,481				
Social Democrats	Tracey Carey	4.4	1,106	1,125	1,214	1,273				
Independent	Gemma O'Doherty	4.1	1,026	1,088	1,149					
Independent	Glenn Brady	2.7	670	726						
Independent	Peadar O'Kelly	1.4	350							
Independent	Charlie Keddy	0.4	112							
Independent	Cormac McKay	0.2	46							
Electorate: 99,039 Valid: 25,090 Spoilt: 254 (1.0%) Quota: 12,546 Turnout: 25,344 (25.6%)

=== 2016 general election ===
2016 general election: Dublin Fingal
Party	Candidate	FPv%	Count									
Party	Candidate	FPv%	1	2	3	4	5	6	7	8	9	10
Fianna Fáil	Darragh O'Brien	17.9	10,826									
Inds. 4 Change	Clare Daly	15.7	9,480	9,552	9,827	10,566						
Fine Gael	Alan Farrell	12.4	7,514	7,563	7,627	7,664	7,672	8,082	8,244	8,709	8,969	9,965
Labour	Brendan Ryan	10.0	6,009	6,054	6,125	6,193	6,210	6,358	6,800	7,794	8,424	9,406
Sinn Féin	Louise O'Reilly	8.7	5,228	5,246	5,314	5,621	5,719	5,858	6,193	6,465	7,911	8,771
Fine Gael	James Reilly	7.7	4,666	4,699	4,735	4,767	4,769	4,955	5,259	5,549	5,756	6,215
Fianna Fáil	Lorraine Clifford-Lee	5.6	3,359	3,788	3,871	3,937	3,953	4,339	4,705	5,099	5,595	
Inds. 4 Change	Barry Martin	4.0	2,412	2,424	2,694	3,126	3,404	3,649	4,298	5,077		
Green	Joe O'Brien	4.6	2,783	2,802	2,964	3,105	3,125	3,430	3,758			
Independent Alliance	Tony Murphy	4.1	2,503	2,520	2,679	2,863	2,896	3,104				
Renua	Gerry Molloy	3.5	2,091	2,139	2,219	2,326	2,355					
AAA–PBP	Terry Kelleher	3.4	2,067	2,076	2,210							
Independent	Roslyn Fuller	1.3	772	775								
Independent	Marcus de Brun	1.0	627	633								
Independent	Fergal O'Connell	0.1	51	52								
Electorate: 93,486 Valid: 60,388 Spoilt: 462 Quota: 10,065 Turnout: 65.1%

== See also ==
- Elections in the Republic of Ireland
- Politics of the Republic of Ireland
- List of Dáil by-elections
- List of political parties in the Republic of Ireland
