= Dublin Fingal East =

Dáil constituency (2024–present)

- Dáil constituency
- Location of Dublin Fingal East within County Dublin
- Interactive map of constituency boundaries since the 2024 general election
- Major settlements: Donabate; Malahide; Portmarnock; Swords

Current constituency
- Created: 2024
- Seats: 3
- TDs: Ann Graves (SF); Darragh O'Brien (FF); Duncan Smith (Lab)
- Local government area: Fingal
- Created from: Dublin Fingal
- EP constituency: Dublin

Dublin Fingal East is a Dáil constituency represented in Dáil Éireann, the lower house of the Irish parliament or Oireachtas, since the 2024 general election. Established through the Electoral (Amendment) Act 2023, the constituency elects three deputies (Teachtaí Dála, commonly known as TDs) on the system of proportional representation by means of the single transferable vote (PR-STV).

== History and boundaries ==
The 2023 report of the Electoral Commission recommended that at the next general election, the five-seat constituency of Dublin Fingal be divided into two new three-seat constituencies of Dublin Fingal East and Dublin Fingal West.

The Electoral (Amendment) Act 2023 defines the constituency as:

"In the county of Fingal the electoral divisions of:

Donabate, Kinsaley, Malahide East, Malahide West, Portmarnock North, Portmarnock South, Swords-Forrest, Swords-Glasmore, Swords-Lissenhall, Swords-Seatown, Swords Village"

== TDs ==
Teachtaí Dála (TDs) for Dublin Fingal East 2024–
Key to parties: FF = Fianna Fáil; Lab = Labour; SF = Sinn Féin
Dáil	Election	Deputy (Party)	Deputy (Party)	Deputy (Party)
34th	2024	Darragh O'Brien (FF)	Duncan Smith (Lab)	Ann Graves (SF)

Note: The columns in this table are used only for presentational purposes, and no significance should be attached to the order of columns. For details of the order in which seats were won at each election, see the detailed results of that election.

== Elections ==
*: Outgoing TD

=== 2024 general election ===
2024 general election: Dublin Fingal East
Party	Candidate	FPv%	Count										
Party	Candidate	FPv%	1	2	3	4	5	6	7	8	9	10	11
Fianna Fáil	Darragh O'Brien	23.5	8,906	8,913	8,919	8,934	8,957	9,411	9,498				
Sinn Féin	Ann Graves	14.4	5,450	5,466	5,490	5,546	5,711	5,741	5,932	5,978	6,311	7,115	8,394
Labour	Duncan Smith	14.2	5,396	5,424	5,430	5,449	5,554	5,622	5,761	6,270	6,506	7,337	10,265
Fine Gael	Alan Farrell	14.2	5,379	5,386	5,389	5,402	5,408	5,607	5,644	5,968	6,210	6,530	7,242
Social Democrats	Joan Hopkins	10.6	4,025	4,042	4,048	4,066	4,293	4,359	4,423	4,846	5,063	5,774	
Inds. 4 Change	Dean Mulligan	5.9	2,234	2,259	2,279	2,357	2,518	2,544	2,792	2,880	3,428		
Aontú	Margaret McGovern	4.1	1,549	1,561	1,625	1,902	1,943	1,968	2,111	2,140			
Green	Ian Carey	3.7	1,383	1,388	1,390	1,405	1,432	1,464	1,483				
Fianna Fáil	Manju Devi	2.5	940	941	943	955	963						
Independent	Darren Jack Kelly	2.2	834	900	923	1,027	1,042	1,052					
PBP–Solidarity	Ollie Power (Note: Power is a member of People Before Profit.)	2.0	750	762	774	791							
Irish Freedom	Victoria Byrne	1.3	513	527	675								
Liberty Republic	Ben Gilroy	0.8	308	318									
Independent	Tony Donnelly	0.4	149										
Independent	Fergal O'Connell	0.2	83										
Electorate: 62,365 Valid: 37,899 Spoilt: 156 Quota: 9,475 Turnout: 60.9%
