= Electoral (Amendment) Act 2023 =

Constituencies in use at the European elections and the next Dáil election

Oireachtas
- Long title: An Act to provide for the number of members of Dáil Éireann; for the revision of Dáil constituencies; for the number of members to be elected for such Dáil constituencies; to repeal the Electoral (Amendment) (Dáil Constituencies) Act 2017; to give effect to European Council Decision (EU) 2023/2061 of 22 September 20231 establishing the composition of the European Parliament; and for that purpose to revise European Parliament constituencies; to provide for the number of members to be elected for such European Parliament constituencies; to amend the European Parliament Elections Act 1997; and to provide for related matters.
- Citation: No. 40 of 2023
- Signed: 19 December 2023

Legislative history
- Bill citation: No. 77 of 2023
- Introduced by: Minister for Housing, Local Government and Heritage (Darragh O'Brien)
- Introduced: 7 November 2023

Repeals
- Electoral (Amendment) (Dáil Constituencies) Act 2017

The Electoral (Amendment) Act 2023 is a law of Ireland to revise Dáil constituencies and European Parliament constituencies. The revised Dáil constituencies came into effect on the dissolution of the 33rd Dáil. The dissolution had to take place by 19 February 2025; however, the 2024 general election for the 34th Dáil occurred on 29 November. The revised European Parliament constituencies were used at the 2024 European Parliament election.

== Constituency review reports ==
The Electoral Commission was established on 9 February 2023. Under the Electoral Reform Act 2022, it was required to consider a revision of constituencies in light of the 2022 census. On 30 August 2023, the commission delivered a report in which it proposed several changes to Dáil constituencies, increasing the number of seats in the Dáil from 160 to 174, while increasing the number of constituencies from 39 to 43.

In June 2023, the European Parliament adopted a resolution to add an additional 11 MEPs. Ireland would gain one MEP under this arrangement, increasing from 13 to 14. This was adopted by the European Council in September 2023. The Electoral Commission recommended the additional seat be given to the constituency of Midlands–North-West, with the transfer of County Laois and County Offaly from South.

The Act implemented the recommendations of both these reports and repealed the Electoral (Amendment) (Dáil Constituencies) Act 2017, which had defined the constituencies in use since the 2020 general election.

== Revised Dáil constituencies ==
Dáil constituencies to be used at the 2024 general election

| Constituency | Created | Seats | ± Seats |
|---|---|---|---|
| Carlow–Kilkenny | 1948 | 5 | — |
| Cavan–Monaghan | 1977 | 5 | — |
| Clare | 1921 | 4 | — |
| Cork East | 1981 | 4 | — |
| Cork North-Central | 1981 | 5 | +1 |
| Cork North-West | 1981 | 3 | — |
| Cork South-Central | 1981 | 5 | +1 |
| Cork South-West | 1961 | 3 | — |
| Donegal | 2016 | 5 | |
| Dublin Bay North | 2016 | 5 | — |
| Dublin Bay South | 2016 | 4 | — |
| Dublin Central | 1981 | 4 | — |
| Dublin Fingal East | Next | 3 | New |
| Dublin Fingal West | Next | 3 | New |
| Dublin Mid-West | 2002 | 5 | +1 |
| Dublin North-West | 1981 | 3 | — |
| Dublin Rathdown | 2016 | 4 | +1 |
| Dublin South-Central | 1948 | 4 | — |
| Dublin South-West | 1981 | 5 | — |
| Dublin West | 1981 | 5 | +1 |
| Dún Laoghaire | 1977 | 4 | — |
| Galway East | 1977 | 4 | +1 |
| Galway West | 1937 | 5 | — |
| Kerry | 2016 | 5 | — |
| Kildare North | 1997 | 5 | +1 |
| Kildare South | 1997 | 4 | — |
| Laois | Next | 3 | New |
| Limerick City | 2011 | 4 | — |
| Limerick County | 2016 | 3 | — |
| Longford–Westmeath | 2007 | 5 | +1 |
| Louth | 1923 | 5 | — |
| Mayo | 1997 | 5 | +1 |
| Meath East | 2007 | 4 | +1 |
| Meath West | 2007 | 3 | — |
| Offaly | Next | 3 | New |
| Roscommon–Galway | 2016 | 3 | — |
| Sligo–Leitrim | 2016 | 4 | — |
| Tipperary North | Next | 3 | New |
| Tipperary South | Next | 3 | New |
| Waterford | 1923 | 4 | — |
| Wexford | 1921 | 4 | -1 |
| Wicklow | 1923 | 4 | -1 |
| Wicklow–Wexford | Next | 3 | New |

== European Parliament constituencies ==
| Constituency | Area | Seats |
|---|---|---|
| Dublin | The counties of: Dún Laoghaire–Rathdown, Fingal and South Dublin; and the city of Dublin. | 4 |
| Midlands–North-West | The counties of: Cavan, Donegal, Galway, Kildare, Laois, Leitrim, Longford, Louth, Mayo, Meath, Monaghan, Offaly, Roscommon, Sligo and Westmeath; and the city of Galway. | 5 |
| South | The counties of: Carlow, Clare, Cork, Kerry, Kilkenny, Tipperary, Wexford and Wicklow; the cities and counties of Limerick and Waterford; and the city of Cork. | 5 |
