= Martin Daly (politician) =

Irish politician

Martin Daly TD
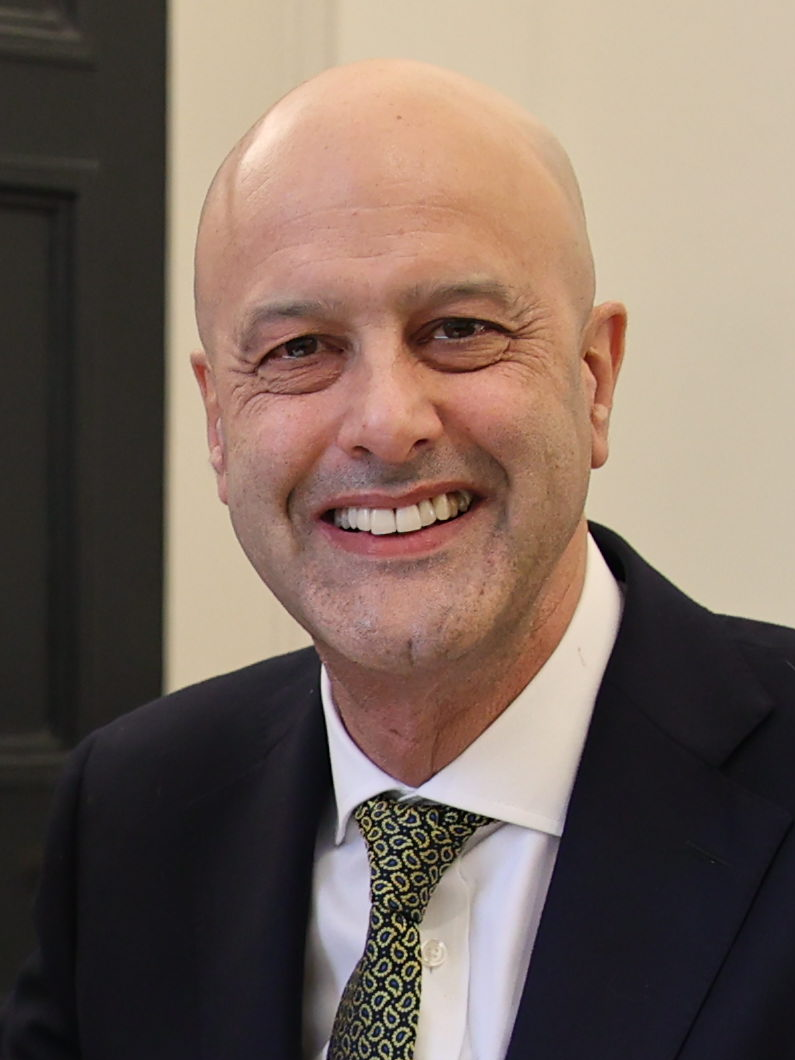
- Daly in 2024

Teachta Dála
- Incumbent
- Assumed office November 2024
- Constituency: Roscommon–Galway

Personal details
- Born: 1962/1963 (age 62–63)
- Party: Fianna Fáil
- Children: 4

Martin Daly (born 1962/1963) is an Irish Fianna Fáil politician who has been a Teachta Dála (TD) for the Roscommon–Galway constituency since the 2024 general election.

== Personal life ==
Daly is a general practitioner (GP) based in Ballygar, County Galway. He is a former president of the Irish Medical Organisation and is a team doctor with Roscommon GAA.

Daly is married, and has four children.

== Political career ==
At the 2024 general election, Daly was elected to the Dáil. He was made Fianna Fáil's spokesperson for health.

Dáil	Election	Deputy (Party)	Deputy (Party)	Deputy (Party)
32nd	2016	Eugene Murphy (FF)	Denis Naughten (Ind.)	Michael Fitzmaurice (Ind.)
33rd	2020	Claire Kerrane (SF)	Denis Naughten (Ind.)	Michael Fitzmaurice (Ind.)
34th	2024	Claire Kerrane (SF)	Martin Daly (FF)	Michael Fitzmaurice (II)
