= Dublin Fingal West =

Dáil constituency (2024–present)

- Dáil constituency
- Location of Dublin Fingal West within County Dublin
- Interactive map of constituency boundaries since the 2024 general election
- Major settlements: Balbriggan; Lusk; Rush; Skerries

Current constituency
- Created: 2024
- Seats: 3
- TDs: Grace Boland (FG); Robert O'Donoghue (Lab); Louise O'Reilly (SF)
- Local government area: Fingal
- Created from: Dublin Fingal
- EP constituency: Dublin

Dublin Fingal West is a Dáil constituency represented in Dáil Éireann, the lower house of the Irish parliament or Oireachtas, since the 2024 general election. Established through the Electoral (Amendment) Act 2023, the constituency elects three deputies (Teachtaí Dála, commonly known as TDs) on the system of proportional representation by means of the single transferable vote (PR-STV).

== History and boundaries ==
The 2023 Report of the Electoral Commission recommended that at the next general election, the five-seat constituency of Dublin Fingal be divided into two new three-seat constituencies of Dublin Fingal East and Dublin Fingal West. The report also recommended a transfer of territory from Dublin North-West.

The Electoral (Amendment) Act 2023 defines the constituency as:

"In the county of Fingal the electoral divisions of:

Airport, Balbriggan Rural, Balbriggan Urban, Ballyboghil, Balscadden, Clonmethan, Dubber, Garristown, Hollywood, Holmpatrick, Kilsallaghan, Lusk, Rush, Skerries, Turnapin."

== TDs ==
Teachtaí Dála (TDs) for Dublin Fingal West 2024–
Key to parties: FG = Fine Gael; Lab = Labour; SF = Sinn Féin
Dáil	Election	Deputy (Party)	Deputy (Party)	Deputy (Party)
34th	2024	Louise O'Reilly (SF)	Robert O'Donoghue (Lab)	Grace Boland (FG)

Note: The columns in this table are used only for presentational purposes, and no significance should be attached to the order of columns. For details of the order in which seats were won at each election, see the detailed results of that election.

== Elections ==
*: Outgoing TD

=== 2024 general election ===
2024 general election: Dublin Fingal West
Party	Candidate	FPv%	Count					
Party	Candidate	FPv%	1	2	3	4	5	6
Sinn Féin	Louise O'Reilly	23.1	6,965	7,079	7,361	8,261		
Labour	Robert O'Donoghue	16.8	5,044	5,098	5,203	6,465	6,862	8,071
Fine Gael	Grace Boland	15.2	4,583	4,609	4,680	5,183	5,218	7,897
Fianna Fáil	Lorraine Clifford-Lee	14.7	4,417	4,446	4,575	4,835	4,885	
Independent	Tony Murphy	11.9	3,588	3,880	4,393	4,768	4,923	5,508
Green	Joe O'Brien	6.1	1,844	1,866	1,905			
PBP–Solidarity	Bryn Edwards (Note: Edwards is a member of People Before Profit.)	4.6	1,392	1,486	1,594			
Aontú	Robbie Loughlin	3.9	1,163	1,486				
Liberty Republic	Ben Gilroy	1.4	417					
Irish Freedom	John Oakes	1.3	392					
The Irish People	Mark Parsons	0.5	157					
Independent	Oghenetano John Uwhumiakpor	0.5	155					
Electorate: 51,455 Valid: 30,117 Spoilt: 168 Quota: 7,530 Turnout: 30,285 (58.9%)
