= Alan Dillon =

Irish politician (born 1982)

Alan Dillon TD
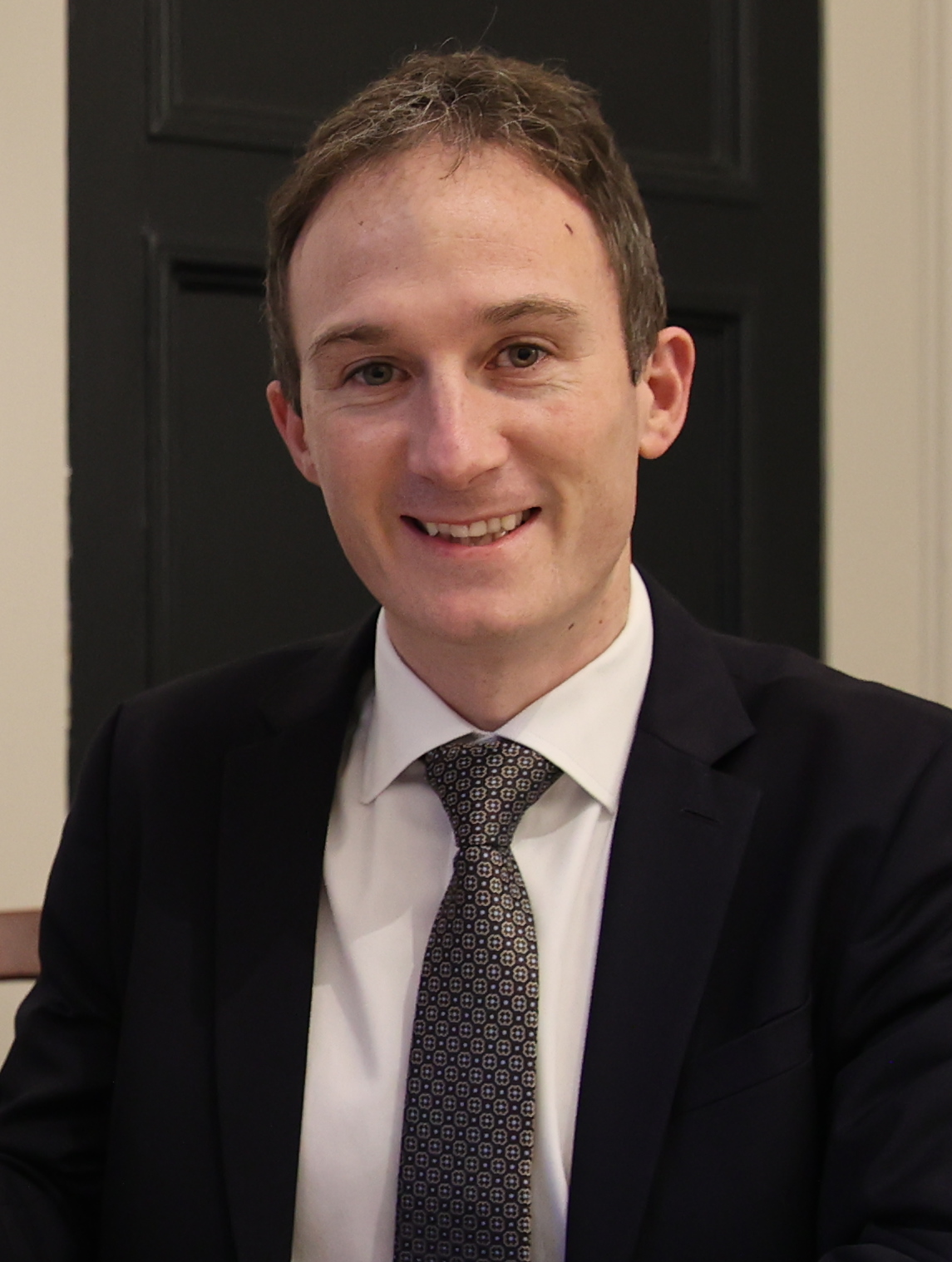
- Dillon in 2024

Minister of State
- 2025–: Enterprise, Tourism and Employment
- 2025–: Climate, Energy and the Environment
- 2024–2025: Housing, Local Government and Heritage

Teachta Dála
- Incumbent
- Assumed office February 2020
- Constituency: Mayo

Chair of the Fine Gael parliamentary party
- In office 25 October 2023 – 17 April 2024
- Leader: Leo Varadkar; Simon Harris
- Preceded by: Richard Bruton
- Succeeded by: Alan Farrell

Personal details
- Born: 28 September 1982 (age 44) Castlebar, County Mayo, Ireland
- Party: Fine Gael
- Spouse: Ashling Dillon (m. 2016)
- Children: 2
- Education: NUI Galway; Maynooth University; Royal College of Surgeons
- Website: alandillon.ie
- Gaelic games career
- Height: 1.81 m (5 ft 11 in)
- Sport: Gaelic football
- Position: Left half forward
Club
- Years: Club
- 1999–: Ballintubber
Club titles
- Mayo titles: 5
Inter-county*
Years	County	Apps (scores)
2003–2017	Mayo	134 (3–225)
Inter-county titles
- Connacht titles: 8
- All Stars: 2
- *Inter County team apps and scores correct as of 28 November 2017.

Alan Dillon (born 28 September 1982) is an Irish Fine Gael politician who has served as Minister of State at the Department of Enterprise, Tourism and Employment and Minister of State at the Department of Climate, Energy and the Environment since January 2025. He has been a Teachta Dála (TD) for the Mayo constituency since the 2020 general election.

Prior to entering politics, he was a two-time All Star winning Gaelic footballer who captained the senior Mayo county team.

== Personal life ==
He is married to Ashling Dillon, and they have two sons. Dillon attended Davitt College in Castlebar for his secondary school education. He studied at NUI Galway, and played for the university football team. Dillon has a MSc in Pharmaceutical Science from the Royal College of Surgeons Ireland, a Postgraduate Diploma in Education from NUI Galway, and a BSc in Applied Mathematics and Biology from Maynooth University. Dillon has also participated in a marketing campaign for Ireland West Airport.

== Gaelic football career ==
Dillon played football with his local club Ballintubber in County Mayo and was a pivotal member of the senior Mayo county team from 2003 until his retirement in 2017, playing in six All-Ireland finals. His fine-tuned skill, his sharp roving eye and his clever reading of the game all contribute to his exceptional footballing abilities. Dillon won his first All Star award in 2006 and a second All Star award in 2012.

On 28 November 2017, Dillon announced his retirement from inter-county football.

== Political career ==
Following his retirement from inter-county football in 2017, there was much speculation that Dillon would succeed former Taoiseach Enda Kenny as a Fine Gael candidate for Mayo. He has numerous links to Fine Gael, an aunt having been Enda Kenny's Castlebar secretary and her husband being Kenny's driver and a county councillor.

He successfully stood as a Fine Gael candidate at the 2020 general election in the Mayo constituency. In July 2020, Dillon was elected as the secretary of the Fine Gael parliamentary party, following its AGM in the Convention Centre Dublin.

In October 2023, Dillon succeeded Richard Bruton as the chair of the Fine Gael parliamentary party. He served as chair until April 2024, when he was succeeded by Alan Farrell.

On 10 April 2024, Dillon was appointed as Minister of State at the Department of Housing, Local Government and Heritage following the appointment of Simon Harris as Taoiseach.

At the 2024 general election, Dillon was re-elected to the Dáil. On 29 January 2025, he was appointed as Minister of State at the Department of Enterprise, Tourism and Employment with special responsibility for small businesses and retail and as Minister of State at the Department of Climate, Energy and the Environment with special responsibility for the circular economy.

Party political offices
Preceded by Richard Bruton	Chair of the Fine Gael parliamentary party 2023–2024	Succeeded by Alan Farrell
Political offices
Preceded by Kieran O'Donnell	Minister of State at the Department of Housing, Local Government and Heritage; 2024–2025	Succeeded by John Cummins
Preceded by Emer Higgins	Minister of State at the Department of Enterprise, Tourism and Employment; 2025–present	Incumbent
Preceded by Ossian Smyth	Minister of State at the Department of Climate, Energy and the Environment; 2025–present	Incumbent

Dáil	Election	Deputy (Party)	Deputy (Party)	Deputy (Party)	Deputy (Party)	Deputy (Party)
28th	1997	Beverley Flynn (FF)	Tom Moffatt (FF)	Enda Kenny (FG)	Michael Ring (FG)	Jim Higgins (FG)
29th	2002	Beverley Flynn (FF)	John Carty (FF)	Enda Kenny (FG)	Michael Ring (FG)	Jerry Cowley (Ind.)
30th	2007	Beverley Flynn (Ind.)	Dara Calleary (FF)	Enda Kenny (FG)	Michael Ring (FG)	John O'Mahony (FG)
31st	2011	Michelle Mulherin (FG)	Dara Calleary (FF)	Enda Kenny (FG)	Michael Ring (FG)	John O'Mahony (FG)
32nd	2016	Lisa Chambers (FF)	Dara Calleary (FF)	Enda Kenny (FG)	Michael Ring (FG)	4 seats 2016–2024
33rd	2020	Rose Conway-Walsh (SF)	Dara Calleary (FF)	Alan Dillon (FG)	Michael Ring (FG)	4 seats 2016–2024
34th	2024	Rose Conway-Walsh (SF)	Dara Calleary (FF)	Alan Dillon (FG)	Keira Keogh (FG)	Paul Lawless (Aon)
