= 1964 Roscommon by-election =

By-election to the 17th Dáil

- 8 July 1964
- Turnout: 34,823 (78.0%)
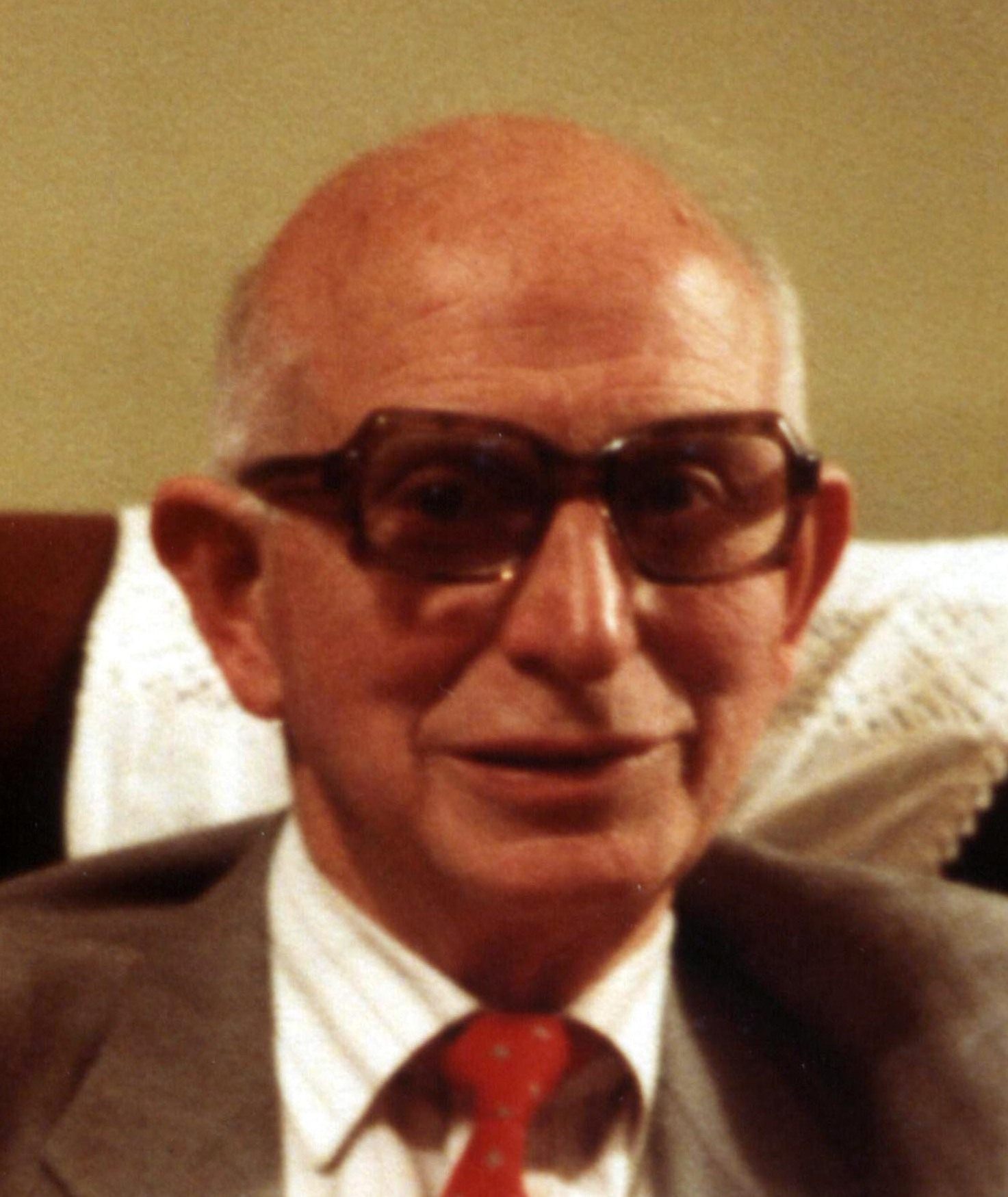
	Burke		Macklin
Nominee	Joan Burke	Hugh Gibbons	Oliver Macklin
Party	Fine Gael	Fianna Fáil	Labour
First preferences	17,308	15,107	2,056
Percentage	49.7%	43.4%	5.9%
Final count	18,754	15,673	–
TD before election
James Burke
Fine Gael
TD after election
Joan Burke
Fine Gael

A Dáil by-election was held in the constituency of Roscommon in Ireland on Wednesday, 8 July 1964, to fill a vacancy in the 17th Dáil. It followed the death of Fine Gael Teachta Dála (TD) James Burke on 12 May 1964.

The writ of election to fill the vacancy was agreed by the Dáil on 17 June 1964.

The by-election was won by the Fine Gael candidate Joan Burke, widow of the deceased TD, James Burke.

== Result ==
1964 Roscommon by-election
Party	Candidate	FPv%	Count	
Party	Candidate	FPv%	1	2
Fine Gael	Joan Burke	49.7	17,308	18,754
Fianna Fáil	Hugh Gibbons	43.4	15,107	15,673
Labour	Oliver Macklin	5.9	2,056	
Sinn Féin	Pádraig Ó Ceallaigh	1.0	352	
Electorate: 44,635 Valid: 34,823 Quota: 17,412 Turnout: 78.0%
