= Roscommon–Galway =

Dáil constituency (2016–present)

- Dáil constituency
- Location of Roscommon–Galway within Ireland
- Interactive map of constituency boundaries since the 2024 general election
- Major settlements: Ballaghaderreen; Ballinasloe; Castlerea; Roscommon; Strokestown

Current constituency
- Created: 2016
- Seats: 3
- TDs: Martin Daly (FF); Michael Fitzmaurice (II); Claire Kerrane (SF)
- Local government areas: County Roscommon; County Galway
- Created from: Roscommon–South Leitrim; Galway East
- EP constituency: Midlands–North-West

Roscommon–Galway is a parliamentary constituency that has been represented in Dáil Éireann, the lower house of the Irish parliament or Oireachtas, from the 2016 general election. The constituency elects three deputies (Teachtaí Dála, commonly known as TDs) on the system of proportional representation by means of the single transferable vote (PR-STV).

== History and boundaries ==
The constituency was established by the Electoral (Amendment) (Dáil Constituencies) Act 2013 and first used at the 2016 election.

The Constituency Review Report 2023 of the Electoral Commission recommended that at the next general election, the boundary of Roscommon–Galway be altered with the transfer of territory from Sligo–Leitrim and the transfer of territory to Galway East.

The Electoral (Amendment) Act 2023 defines the constituency as:

"The county of Roscommon; and the county of Galway except the part thereof which is comprised in the constituencies of Galway East and Galway West."

Changes to the Roscommon–Galway constituency
Years	No. of TDs	Area	Formed by
2016–2020	3	County Roscommon, and the parts of County Galway not in the constituencies of Galway East and Galway West.	County Roscommon, from Roscommon–South Leitrim, Transfer from Galway East of: Ballinasloe Urban; Ahascragh, Ballinasloe Rural, Clontuskert, Kellysgrove, Killure, Kylemore, Lismanny, in the former Rural District of Ballinasloe No. 1; Ballinastack, Ballymoe, Ballynakill, Boyounagh, Creggs, Curraghmore, Glennamaddy, Island, Kilcroan, Kiltullagh, Raheen, Shankill, Templetogher, Toberroe, in the former Rural District of Glennamaddy; Ballynakill, Caltra, Castleblakeney, Castleffrench, Clonbrock, Cloonkeen, Killeroran, Killian, Taghboy, in the former Rural District of Mount Bellew; Dunmore North, Toberadosh, in the former Rural District of Tuam.
2020–	3	County Roscommon, except for the part in the constituency of Sligo–Leitrim, and the parts of County Galway not in the constituencies of Galway East and Galway West.	Transfer from Galway East of: Aughrim, Ballymacward, Kilconnell, Killaan, Killallaghtan, Oatfield, in the former Rural District of Ballinasloe No. 1; Scregg, in the former Rural District of Glennamaddy; Annagh, Mount Bellew, Mounthazel, in the former Rural District of Mount Bellew; Addergoole, Carrownagur, Clonbern, Cloonkeen, Dunmore South, in the former Rural District of Tuam; Transfer to Sligo–Leitrim of: Aghafin, Altagowlan, Ballyfarnan, Ballyformoyle, Boyle Rural, Boyle Urban, Crossna, Danesfort, Keadew, Kilbryan, Killukin, Lough Allen, Oakport, Rockingham, Rushfield, Tivannagh, Tumna North, Tumna South, in the former Rural District of Boyle No. 1

== TDs ==
Teachtaí Dála (TDs) for Roscommon–Galway 2016–
Key to parties: FF = Fianna Fáil; Ind. = Independent; II = Independent Ireland; SF = Sinn Féin
Dáil	Election	Deputy (Party)	Deputy (Party)	Deputy (Party)
32nd	2016	Eugene Murphy (FF)	Denis Naughten (Ind.)	Michael Fitzmaurice (Ind.)
33rd	2020	Claire Kerrane (SF)	Denis Naughten (Ind.)	Michael Fitzmaurice (Ind.)
34th	2024	Claire Kerrane (SF)	Martin Daly (FF)	Michael Fitzmaurice (II)

Note: The columns in this table are used only for presentational purposes, and no significance should be attached to the order of columns. For details of the order in which seats were won at each election, see the detailed results of that election.

== Elections ==
*: Outgoing TD

=== 2024 general election ===
2024 general election: Roscommon–Galway
Party	Candidate	FPv%	Count						
Party	Candidate	FPv%	1	2	3	4	5	6	7
Independent Ireland	Michael Fitzmaurice	29.2	12,002						
Sinn Féin	Claire Kerrane	19.5	8,039	8,449	8,469	8,540	9,331	9,551	11,087
Fianna Fáil	Martin Daly	17.7	7,283	7,705	7,715	7,811	8,010	8,372	10,234
Fine Gael	Aisling Dolan	11.8	4,843	5,012	5,017	5,097	5,228	6,625	7,593
Independent	Eugene Murphy	10.5	4,327	4,782	4,848	4,954	5,441	5,779	
Fine Gael	Dympna Daly Finn	5.3	2,164	2,252	2,262	2,325	2,425		
PBP–Solidarity	Andrew Mannion (Note: Mannion is a member of People Before Profit.)	2.0	814	848	862	1,006			
Aontú	Cormac Ó Corcoráin	1.9	789	868	909	1,031			
Green	Martina O'Connor	1.1	441	449	449				
The Irish People	Alan Sweeney	0.5	224	246	306				
Independent	Vincent Beirne	0.5	202	234					
Electorate: 62,727 Valid: 41,128 Spoilt: 204 Quota: 10,283 Turnout: 65.9%

=== 2020 general election ===
2020 general election: Roscommon–Galway
Party	Candidate	FPv%	Count					
Party	Candidate	FPv%	1	2	3	4	5	6
Independent	Michael Fitzmaurice	28.7	13,077					
Independent	Denis Naughten	18.5	8,422	9,057	9,419	10,866	14,683	
Sinn Féin	Claire Kerrane	17.5	8,003	8,322	8,690	9,402	10,082	10,545
Fianna Fáil	Eugene Murphy	10.8	4,945	5,201	5,381	7,242	8,058	9,204
Fine Gael	Aisling Dolan	12.0	5,466	5,635	5,710	6,162		
Fianna Fáil	Orla Leyden	6.5	2,953	3,124	3,197			
Green	Julie O'Donoghue	3.1	1,413	1,445	1,610			
Aontú	James Hope	1.1	504	542				
Solidarity–PBP	Kenny Tynan (Note: Tynan was a member of People Before Profit.)	0.9	422	442				
National Party	Paul Hanley	0.7	319	331				
Independent	Thomas Fallon	0.2	88	109				
Electorate: 69,598 Valid: 45,612 Spoilt: 330 Quota: 11,404 Turnout: 45,942 (66.0%)

=== 2016 general election ===
2016 general election: Roscommon–Galway
Party	Candidate	FPv%	Count							
Party	Candidate	FPv%	1	2	3	4	5	6	7	8
Independent	Denis Naughten	30.5	13,936							
Independent	Michael Fitzmaurice	21.3	9,750	10,964	10,996	11,073	11,275	11,630		
Fianna Fáil	Eugene Murphy	14.9	6,813	7,157	7,162	7,192	7,260	7,368	7,565	10,104
Fine Gael	Maura Hopkins	14.9	6,812	7,317	7,324	7,428	7,555	7,698	8,388	9,313
Sinn Féin	Claire Kerrane	6.7	3,075	3,196	3,207	3,256	3,301	3,591	3,826	
Fianna Fáil	Shane Curran	4.4	2,006	2,164	2,168	2,198	2,240	2,294	2,389	
Labour	John Kelly	2.7	1,211	1,254	1,258	1,320	1,373	1,442		
AAA–PBP	Eddie Conroy	2.1	982	1,008	1,015	1,146	1,172			
Renua	Anne Farrell	1.1	520	577	580	616				
Green	Miriam Hennesy	0.6	286	305	307					
Independent	Anthony Coleman	0.5	214	229	237					
Independent	Thomas Fallon	0.2	75	88						
Electorate: 64,235 Valid: 45,680 Spoilt: 315 Quota: 11,421 Turnout: 71.6%

== See also ==
- Elections in the Republic of Ireland
- Politics of the Republic of Ireland
- List of political parties in the Republic of Ireland
