= Joan Burke =

Irish politician (1928–2016)

Teachta Dála
- In office June 1969 – June 1981
- Constituency: Roscommon–Leitrim
- In office July 1964 – June 1969
- Constituency: Roscommon

Personal details
- Born: Hanna Teresa Crowley; 8 February 1928 Bandon, County Cork, Ireland
- Died: 27 October 2016 (aged 88) Rathfarnham, Dublin, Ireland
- Party: Fine Gael
- Spouse: James Burke (m. 1959; died 1964)
- Children: 2
- Education: University College Cork

Joan Theresa Burke (née Crowley; 8 February 1928 – 27 November 2016) was an Irish Fine Gael politician, farmer and nurse who served as a Teachta Dála (TD) from 1964 to 1981.

She was first elected to Dáil Éireann as a Fine Gael TD for the Roscommon constituency at the July 1964 by-election caused by the death of her husband James Burke. Her victory made her the first woman to ever represent County Roscommon as a TD, and she was only the fourth woman to represent Cumann na nGaedheal/Fine Gael since the foundation of the state. Burke topped the poll in every single election she ever fought.

She was from Bandon, County Cork. She was educated at Presentation Convent, Bandon, and later at Loreto Convent, Killarney, County Kerry. She trained as a nurse at Galway Regional Hospital, qualifying in 1951 and worked in Dublin at Cork Street Fever Hospital, and Cherry Orchard Hospital, Ballyfermot. She first came to Tulsk to attend a friend's wedding and while there met James Burke, whom she later married in 1959. At the time of the marriage, James had already been a TD for 5 years. It was in James' native Tulsk the pair settled.

As a TD, Joan Burke was a pronounced opponent of the “marriage bar” which prohibited women in Ireland from working in the public sector if they were married (the mentality of the time being that a married woman's place was in the home). She was also a noted advocate for the rights of farmers.

She retired from politics at the 1981 general election.

== See also ==
- Families in the Oireachtas

Dáil	Election	Deputy (Party)	Deputy (Party)	Deputy (Party)	Deputy (Party)
4th	1923	George Noble Plunkett (Rep)	Henry Finlay (CnaG)	Gerald Boland (Rep)	Andrew Lavin (CnaG)
4th	1925 by-election	George Noble Plunkett (Rep)	Martin Conlon (CnaG)	Gerald Boland (Rep)	Andrew Lavin (CnaG)
5th	1927 (Jun)	Patrick O'Dowd (FF)	Martin Conlon (CnaG)	Gerald Boland (FF)	Michael Brennan (Ind.)
6th	1927 (Sep)	Patrick O'Dowd (FF)	Martin Conlon (CnaG)	Gerald Boland (FF)	Michael Brennan (Ind.)
7th	1932	Daniel O'Rourke (FF)	Martin Conlon (CnaG)	Gerald Boland (FF)	Frank MacDermot (NCP)
8th	1933	Patrick O'Dowd (FF)	Michael Brennan (CnaG)	Gerald Boland (FF)	Frank MacDermot (NCP)
9th	1937	Michael Brennan (FG)	Daniel O'Rourke (FF)	Gerald Boland (FF)	3 seats 1937–1948
10th	1938	Michael Brennan (FG)	Daniel O'Rourke (FF)	Gerald Boland (FF)	3 seats 1937–1948
11th	1943	John Meighan (CnaT)	John Beirne (CnaT)	Gerald Boland (FF)	3 seats 1937–1948
12th	1944	Daniel O'Rourke (FF)	John Beirne (CnaT)	Gerald Boland (FF)	3 seats 1937–1948
13th	1948	Daniel O'Rourke (FF)	John Beirne (CnaT)	Gerald Boland (FF)	Jack McQuillan (CnaP)
14th	1951	John Finan (CnaT)	John Beirne (CnaT)	Gerald Boland (FF)	Jack McQuillan (Ind.)
15th	1954	James Burke (FG)	John Beirne (CnaT)	Gerald Boland (FF)	Jack McQuillan (Ind.)
16th	1957	James Burke (FG)	John Beirne (CnaT)	Gerald Boland (FF)	Jack McQuillan (Ind.)
17th	1961	James Burke (FG)	Patrick J. Reynolds (FG)	Brian Lenihan Snr (FF)	Jack McQuillan (NPD)
17th	1964 by-election	Joan Burke (FG)	Patrick J. Reynolds (FG)	Brian Lenihan Snr (FF)	Jack McQuillan (NPD)
18th	1965	Joan Burke (FG)	Patrick J. Reynolds (FG)	Brian Lenihan Snr (FF)	Hugh Gibbons (FF)
19th	1969	Constituency abolished. See Roscommon–Leitrim			

Dáil	Election	Deputy (Party)	Deputy (Party)	Deputy (Party)
22nd	1981	Terry Leyden (FF)	Seán Doherty (FF)	John Connor (FG)
23rd	1982 (Feb)	Terry Leyden (FF)	Seán Doherty (FF)	Liam Naughten (FG)
24th	1982 (Nov)	Terry Leyden (FF)	Seán Doherty (FF)	Liam Naughten (FG)
25th	1987	Terry Leyden (FF)	Seán Doherty (FF)	Liam Naughten (FG)
26th	1989	Terry Leyden (FF)	Tom Foxe (Ind.)	John Connor (FG)
27th	1992	Constituency abolished. See Longford–Roscommon		

Dáil	Election	Deputy (Party)	Deputy (Party)	Deputy (Party)
19th	1969	Hugh Gibbons (FF)	Brian Lenihan (FF)	Joan Burke (FG)
20th	1973	Hugh Gibbons (FF)	Patrick J. Reynolds (FG)	Joan Burke (FG)
21st	1977	Terry Leyden (FF)	Seán Doherty (FF)	Joan Burke (FG)
22nd	1981	Constituency abolished. See Roscommon and Sligo–Leitrim		
