= Alan Farrell =

Irish politician (born 1977)

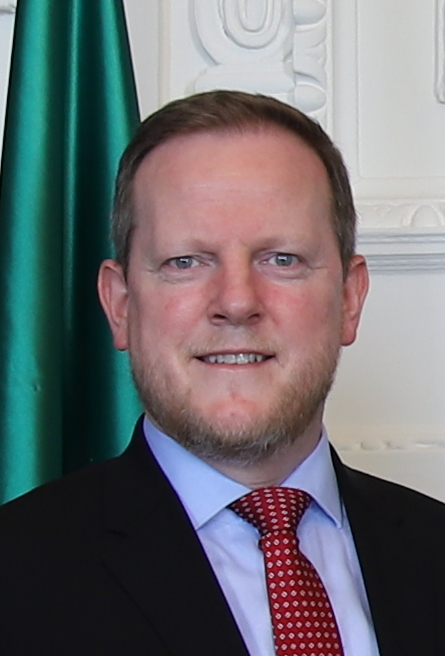
- Farrell in 2024

Senator
- In office 10 December 2024 – 30 January 2025
- Constituency: Nominated by the Taoiseach

Teachta Dála
- In office February 2016 – November 2024
- Constituency: Dublin Fingal
- In office February 2011 – February 2016
- Constituency: Dublin North

Chair of the Committee on Children and Youth Affairs
- In office 8 July 2017 – 15 September 2020
- Preceded by: Jim Daly
- Succeeded by: Kathleen Funchion

Chair of the Fine Gael parliamentary party
- In office 17 April 2024 – 30 January 2025
- Leader: Simon Harris
- Preceded by: Alan Dillon
- Succeeded by: Micheál Carrigy

Chair of the Committee on Communications and Transport
- In office 24 September 2024 – 8 November 2024
- Preceded by: Joe Carey
- Succeeded by: Michael Murphy

Personal details
- Born: 29 December 1977 (age 48) Malahide, Dublin, Ireland
- Party: Fine Gael
- Spouse: Emma Doyle (m. 2010)
- Children: 2
- Education: Dublin City University
- Website: alanfarrell.ie

Alan Farrell (born 29 December 1977) is an Irish former Fine Gael politician who served as a member of Seanad Éireann from December 2024 to January 2025. He was a Teachta Dála (TD) for the Dublin North constituency from 2011 to 2016 and for the Dublin Fingal constituency from 2016 until 2024. He was chair of the Committee on Children and Youth Affairs from 2016 to 2020 and chair of the Committee on Communications and Transport from September to November 2024. He served as chair of the Fine Gael Parliamentary Party from April 2024 to January 2025.

In May 2025, Alan was appointed Senior Director of Government Affairs and Policy at Liquid Gas Ireland.

== Political career ==
Farrell served as a Fingal County Councillor from 2004 to 2011 and as Mayor of Fingal from 2007 to 2008.

=== 31st Dáil ===
In the 31st Dáil, Farrell was a member of the Joint Oireachtas Committee on Justice, Equality and Defence and the Joint Oireachtas Committee on Finance, Public Expenditure and Reform. He was also the chair of the Fine Gael Committee on Public Expenditure and Reform from 2011 to 2013 and the Fine Gael Committee on Justice, Defense and Equality from 2013 to 2016.

Farrell was the subject of controversy after he hired his wife, Emma Doyle, as his temporary parliamentary assistant for four months in the Dáil. This was just two weeks after she was rejected by Farrell's Malahide Fine Gael Party branch as his replacement on Fingal County Council in 2011. Parliamentary assistants salaries range between €41,092 and €52,200 per year, which is paid for by the State.

In 2013, Farrell was appointed Head of the Irish Delegation to the OSCE Parliamentary Assembly by Taoiseach Enda Kenny.

In October 2013, he referred to singer Sinéad O'Connor as being "mad as a brush", in a tweet. He later issued a brief apology via his website and later deleted the apology.

=== 32nd Dáil ===
Farrell was re-elected at the 2016 general election. In the 32nd Dáil, Farrell was a member of the Public Account Committee and the Joint Oireachtas Committee on Justice and Equality. Farrell was reappointed as Head of Delegation to the OSCE PA following the formation of Government. He was appointed chair of the Committee on Children and Youth Affairs in July 2017.

=== 33rd Dáil ===
Farrell was re-elected at the 2020 general election. On 30 September 2020, he was appointed Fine Gael's spokesperson on Climate Action by party leader Leo Varadkar.

In April 2024, Farrell succeeded Alan Dillon as the chair of the Fine Gael parliamentary party. Farrell retained this position until 30 January 2025, on the election of the new Seanad.

In September 2024, Farrell succeeded Joe Carey as the chair of the Oireachtas Committee on Communications & Transport, a role held until the dissolution of the 33rd Dáil.

Farrell lost his seat at the 2024 general election. On 10 December 2024, he was nominated by the Taoiseach to the Seanad.

He contested the 2025 Seanad election on the Industrial and Commercial Panel, but was not elected.

== Controversy ==
Farrell took Hertz Rent A Car to court after one of its vehicles knocked against his Audi A6 while its driver was engaged in an encounter with a spider which crawled along her arm at a traffic stop. Farrell claimed to have experienced neck and shoulder injuries as a result of the collision, which occurred in Drumcondra on 9 April 2015. In 2018, a photograph - showing Farrell at the time he was supposed to have been injured holding a poster of himself on an electricity pole while standing on a ladder in Skerries - was shown in Dublin District Court. Judge Michael Coghlan looked unfavourably on the personal injuries claim, ruling that Farrell had not sustained a "significant injury" and awarding him a total of €2,500. Judge Coghlan also noted in court that a separate claim by Farrell for material damage to his car had been relinquished since the accident. Photographs taken by the driver at the scene (none were produced by Farrell) were shown to the court and some difficulty occurred in locating the precise damage to Farrell's motor car. The Sunday Independent suggested the case "raises serious questions about Mr Farrell's judgment", contrasting it with insurance problems for motorists and referring to past remarks made by Farrell on Ireland's supposed "compo culture".

== Personal life ==
In November 2018, Farrell spoke publicly about his lifelong battle against insomnia, which often keeps him awake until 4 am. Farrell's insomnia first occurred, he has said, when he was "five or six".

Party political offices
Preceded by Alan Dillon	Chair of the Fine Gael parliamentary party 2024–2025	Succeeded by Micheál Carrigy

Dáil	Election	Deputy (Party)	Deputy (Party)	Deputy (Party)	Deputy (Party)	Deputy (Party)	Deputy (Party)	Deputy (Party)	Deputy (Party)
4th	1923	Alfie Byrne (Ind.)	Francis Cahill (CnaG)	Margaret Collins-O'Driscoll (CnaG)	Seán McGarry (CnaG)	William Hewat (BP)	Richard Mulcahy (CnaG)	Seán T. O'Kelly (Rep)	Ernie O'Malley (Rep)
4th	1925 by-election	Alfie Byrne (Ind.)	Patrick Leonard (CnaG)	Margaret Collins-O'Driscoll (CnaG)	Oscar Traynor (Rep)	William Hewat (BP)	Richard Mulcahy (CnaG)	Seán T. O'Kelly (Rep)	Ernie O'Malley (Rep)
5th	1927 (Jun)	Alfie Byrne (Ind.)	John Byrne (CnaG)	Margaret Collins-O'Driscoll (CnaG)	Oscar Traynor (SF)	Denis Cullen (Lab)	Richard Mulcahy (CnaG)	Seán T. O'Kelly (FF)	Kathleen Clarke (FF)
6th	1927 (Sep)	Alfie Byrne (Ind.)	John Byrne (CnaG)	Margaret Collins-O'Driscoll (CnaG)	Patrick Leonard (CnaG)	James Larkin (IWL)	Richard Mulcahy (CnaG)	Seán T. O'Kelly (FF)	Eamonn Cooney (FF)
6th	1928 by-election	Alfie Byrne (Ind.)	John Byrne (CnaG)	Margaret Collins-O'Driscoll (CnaG)	Patrick Leonard (CnaG)	Vincent Rice (CnaG)	Richard Mulcahy (CnaG)	Seán T. O'Kelly (FF)	Eamonn Cooney (FF)
6th	1929 by-election	Thomas F. O'Higgins (CnaG)	John Byrne (CnaG)	Margaret Collins-O'Driscoll (CnaG)	Patrick Leonard (CnaG)	Vincent Rice (CnaG)	Richard Mulcahy (CnaG)	Seán T. O'Kelly (FF)	Eamonn Cooney (FF)
7th	1932	Alfie Byrne (Ind.)	John Byrne (CnaG)	Margaret Collins-O'Driscoll (CnaG)	Oscar Traynor (FF)	Cormac Breathnach (FF)	Richard Mulcahy (CnaG)	Seán T. O'Kelly (FF)	Eamonn Cooney (FF)
8th	1933	Alfie Byrne (Ind.)	Patrick Belton (CnaG)	Vincent Rice (CnaG)	Oscar Traynor (FF)	Cormac Breathnach (FF)	Richard Mulcahy (CnaG)	Seán T. O'Kelly (FF)	Eamonn Cooney (FF)
9th	1937	Constituency abolished. See Dublin North-East and Dublin North-West							

Dáil	Election	Deputy (Party)	Deputy (Party)	Deputy (Party)	Deputy (Party)
22nd	1981	Ray Burke (FF)	John Boland (FG)	Nora Owen (FG)	3 seats 1981–1992
23rd	1982 (Feb)	Ray Burke (FF)	John Boland (FG)	Nora Owen (FG)	3 seats 1981–1992
24th	1982 (Nov)	Ray Burke (FF)	John Boland (FG)	Nora Owen (FG)	3 seats 1981–1992
25th	1987	Ray Burke (FF)	John Boland (FG)	G. V. Wright (FF)	3 seats 1981–1992
26th	1989	Ray Burke (FF)	Nora Owen (FG)	Seán Ryan (Lab)	3 seats 1981–1992
27th	1992	Ray Burke (FF)	Nora Owen (FG)	Seán Ryan (Lab)	Trevor Sargent (GP)
28th	1997	Ray Burke (FF)	Nora Owen (FG)	G. V. Wright (FF)	Trevor Sargent (GP)
28th	1998 by-election	Seán Ryan (Lab)	Nora Owen (FG)	G. V. Wright (FF)	Trevor Sargent (GP)
29th	2002	Seán Ryan (Lab)	Jim Glennon (FF)	G. V. Wright (FF)	Trevor Sargent (GP)
30th	2007	James Reilly (FG)	Michael Kennedy (FF)	Darragh O'Brien (FF)	Trevor Sargent (GP)
31st	2011	James Reilly (FG)	Alan Farrell (FG)	Brendan Ryan (Lab)	Clare Daly (SP)
32nd	2016	Constituency abolished. See Dublin Fingal			

Dáil	Election	Deputy (Party)	Deputy (Party)	Deputy (Party)	Deputy (Party)	Deputy (Party)
32nd	2016	Louise O'Reilly (SF)	Clare Daly (I4C)	Brendan Ryan (Lab)	Darragh O'Brien (FF)	Alan Farrell (FG)
32nd	2019 by-election	Louise O'Reilly (SF)	Joe O'Brien (GP)	Brendan Ryan (Lab)	Darragh O'Brien (FF)	Alan Farrell (FG)
33rd	2020	Louise O'Reilly (SF)	Joe O'Brien (GP)	Duncan Smith (Lab)	Darragh O'Brien (FF)	Alan Farrell (FG)
34th	2024	Constituency abolished. See Dublin Fingal East and Dublin Fingal West.				
