= Grace Boland =

Irish politician

Grace Boland TD
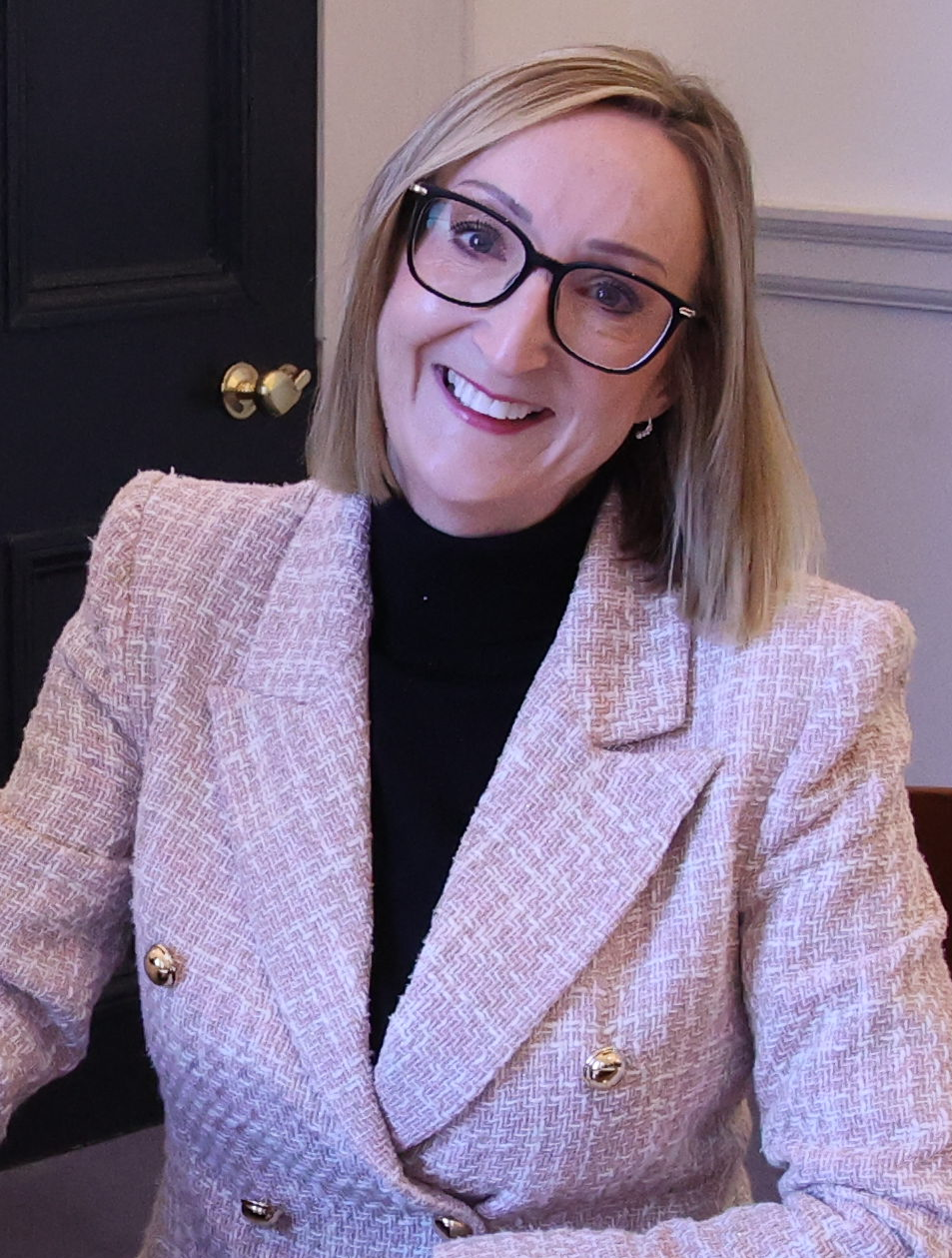
- Boland in 2024

Teachta Dála
- Incumbent
- Assumed office November 2024
- Constituency: Dublin Fingal West

Personal details
- Born: 1976/1977 (age 48–49)
- Party: Fine Gael
- Children: 2
- Parent: John Boland (father)

Grace Boland (born 1976/1977) is an Irish Fine Gael politician who has been a Teachta Dála (TD) for the Dublin Fingal West constituency since the 2024 general election.

Boland is the daughter of John Boland, a Fine Gael TD and cabinet minister who held roles including Minister for Health, Minister for Education, and Minister for the Environment under Taoiseach Garret FitzGerald. Her uncle and godfather, Cathal Boland, has served as a councillor in Fingal. She is a lawyer and practises in Skerries.

Dáil	Election	Deputy (Party)	Deputy (Party)	Deputy (Party)
34th	2024	Louise O'Reilly (SF)	Robert O'Donoghue (Lab)	Grace Boland (FG)
