= Claire Kerrane =

Irish politician and trade unionist (born 1992)

Claire Kerrane TD
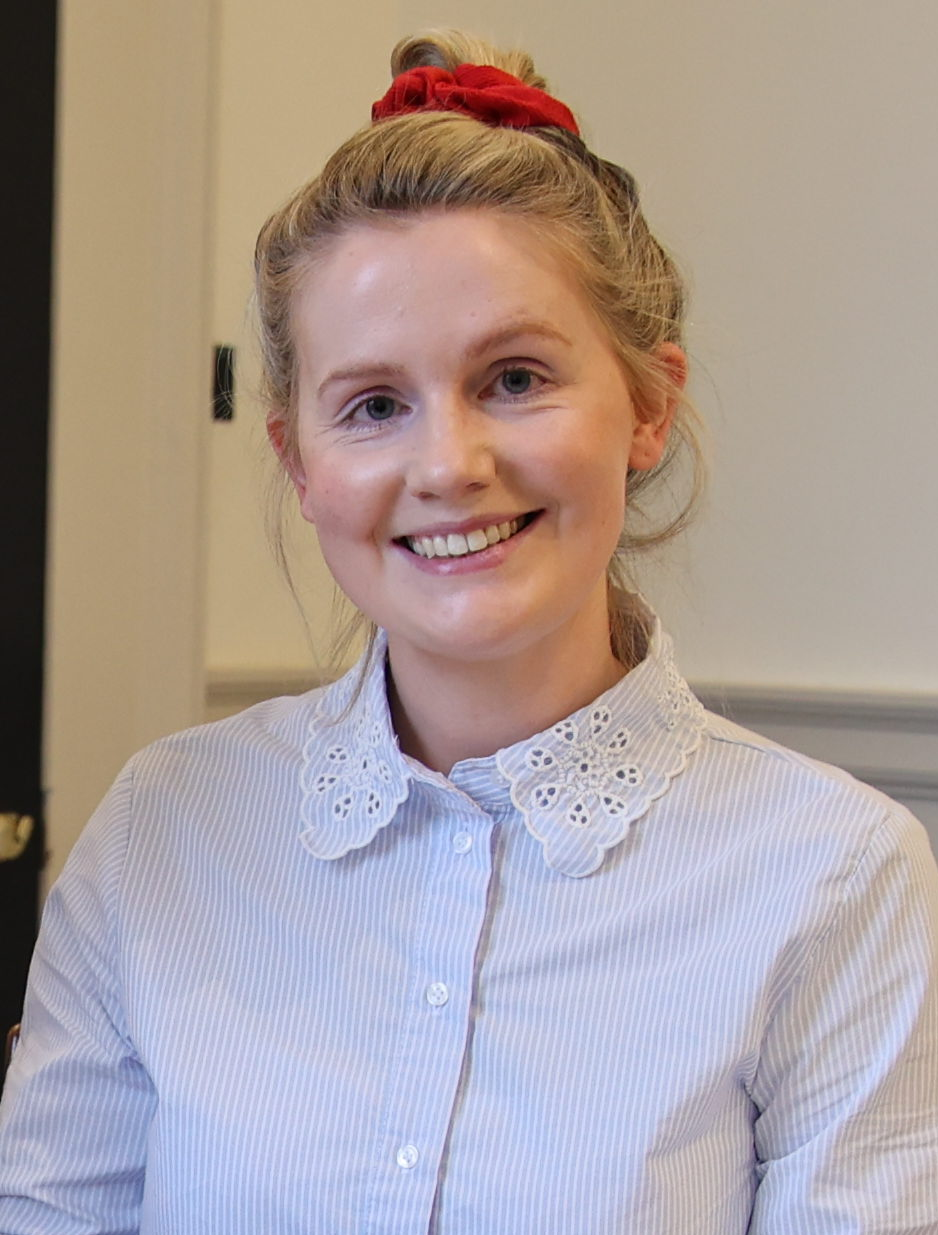
- Kerrane in 2024

Teachta Dála
- Incumbent
- Assumed office February 2020
- Constituency: Roscommon–Galway

Personal details
- Born: 24 April 1992 (age 34) Frenchpark, County Roscommon, Ireland
- Party: Sinn Féin
- Education: NUI Galway

Claire Kerrane (born 24 April 1992) is an Irish Sinn Féin politician who has been a Teachta Dála (TD) for the Roscommon–Galway constituency since the 2020 general election.

She is a member of the Sinn Féin Ard chomhairle. She is the party's spokesperson on children and youth

== Early and personal life ==
Kerrane is from the village of Tibohine in County Roscommon. She was raised on a farm. She has said there was no history of republicanism in her family: her mother is English and her paternal grandfather was a "staunch Fine Gael activist". She joined Sinn Féin at the age of 18 during a dispute over plans to build an anaerobic digestion plant in her area, when she became involved in an action group against the project.

In 2016, Kerrane qualified as a secondary school teacher.

== Political career ==
Kerrane joined Ógra Shinn Féin at the age of 15 and was a Sinn Féin organiser at NUI Galway (NUIG) during her time as a university student there studying English, Sociology and Politics. She was still a student at NUIG when she became a parliamentary assistant to independent TD Luke 'Ming' Flanagan on his election to the Dáil at the 2011 general election. Later she became a political adviser on social protection for Sinn Féin in Leinster House.

Flanagan endorsed her as a candidate at the 2020 general election, in which she was elected and entered national politics for the first time. Kerrane retained her seat at the 2024 general election.

== Political views ==
Kerrane has traced her political awakening to the 2011 closure of the emergency unit at Roscommon University Hospital, an event that sparked protests across the county and left her with a sense of betrayal after Fine Gael broke campaign promises to retain the service. Kerrane has noted that Sinn Féin had been strongly involved in the campaign, despite its limited local presence, and credited her family’s close connection with long-time Sinn Féin councillor Michael Mulligan with deepening her engagement. Kerrane has described Irish unity as her central motivation, alongside Sinn Féin left-republican commitment to social justice and equality. Rejecting claims of any ideological drift to the centre, in 2022 she argued that politics in Ireland had shifted away from old Fianna Fáil-Fine Gael divides and expressed her desire to see Sinn Féin work with other small left-wing parties to form a left-led government in the future.

Dáil	Election	Deputy (Party)	Deputy (Party)	Deputy (Party)
32nd	2016	Eugene Murphy (FF)	Denis Naughten (Ind.)	Michael Fitzmaurice (Ind.)
33rd	2020	Claire Kerrane (SF)	Denis Naughten (Ind.)	Michael Fitzmaurice (Ind.)
34th	2024	Claire Kerrane (SF)	Martin Daly (FF)	Michael Fitzmaurice (II)
