= Louise O'Reilly =

Irish politician (born 1973)

Louise O'Reilly TD
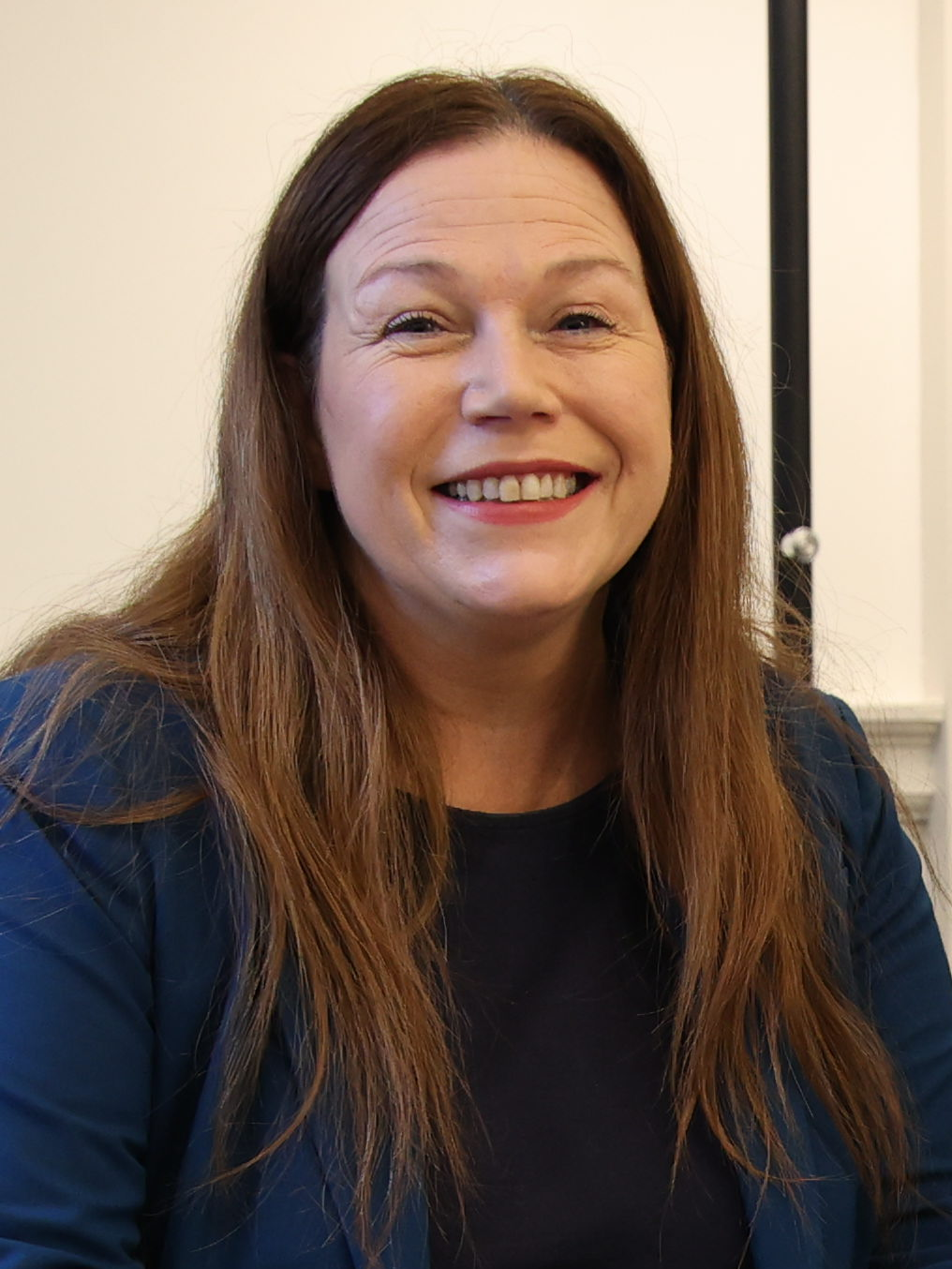
- O'Reilly in 2024

Teachta Dála
- Incumbent
- Assumed office November 2024
- Constituency: Dublin Fingal West
- In office February 2016 – November 2024
- Constituency: Dublin Fingal

Personal details
- Born: 27 September 1973 (age 52) Dublin, Ireland
- Party: Sinn Féin
- Spouse: Ciarán Moore (m. 2013)
- Children: 1
- Education: University College Dublin

Louise O'Reilly (born 27 September 1973) is an Irish Sinn Féin politician who has been a Teachta Dála (TD) for the Dublin Fingal West constituency since the 2024 general election, and previously for Dublin Fingal from 2016 to 2024.

== Background ==
O'Reilly describes herself as being "born a republican socialist" because of her families' involvement in trade unionism. Her grandfather was a shop steward for the Irish Transport and General Workers' Union while her grandmother was one for the Irish Women Workers' Union. Her father Mick O’Reilly was a trade union official as well, and was a member of the Connolly Youth Movement, the youth wing of the Communist Party of Ireland, before joining the Labour Party, to which the union he worked for was affiliated.

O'Reilly herself worked as an organiser with the SIPTU trade union for a decade before her entrance into politics.

== Political career ==
O'Reilly was selected as the Sinn Féin candidate for Dublin Fingal in March 2015 in preparation for the 2016 Irish general election. In that election O'Reilly was elected on the 10th count. The Phoenix suggested that Sinn Féin had deliberately placed O'Reilly in Dublin Fingal rather than Dublin South-Central (containing Crumlin, where she lived at the time) believing she could successfully displace James Reilly of Fine Gael. Reilly's run as Health Minister was considered to be stalling while O'Reilly was believed to be strong on health due to her previous experience as a trade union official representing nurses and doctors. O'Reilly did, in fact, go on to pip James Reilly for the seat. Her opponents accused her of being "parachuted" into the constituency, and it was only after she was elected that she moved from Crumlin to Skerries to reside in the constituency she represented.

At the general election in February 2020, O'Reilly was re-elected in Dublin Fingal, topping the poll with nearly 25% of the first-preference votes.

She was appointed Sinn Féin's spokesperson on Enterprise, Trade and Employment on 2 July 2020. She was previously the party's Health spokesperson.

O'Reilly was re-elected in the 2024 Irish general election in Dublin Fingal West. She was subsequently appointed Cathaoirleach of the Joint Committee on Public Petitions and the Ombudsmen.

Dáil	Election	Deputy (Party)	Deputy (Party)	Deputy (Party)	Deputy (Party)	Deputy (Party)
32nd	2016	Louise O'Reilly (SF)	Clare Daly (I4C)	Brendan Ryan (Lab)	Darragh O'Brien (FF)	Alan Farrell (FG)
32nd	2019 by-election	Louise O'Reilly (SF)	Joe O'Brien (GP)	Brendan Ryan (Lab)	Darragh O'Brien (FF)	Alan Farrell (FG)
33rd	2020	Louise O'Reilly (SF)	Joe O'Brien (GP)	Duncan Smith (Lab)	Darragh O'Brien (FF)	Alan Farrell (FG)
34th	2024	Constituency abolished. See Dublin Fingal East and Dublin Fingal West.				

Dáil	Election	Deputy (Party)	Deputy (Party)	Deputy (Party)
34th	2024	Louise O'Reilly (SF)	Robert O'Donoghue (Lab)	Grace Boland (FG)
