= Darragh O'Brien =

Irish politician (born 1974)

Darragh O'Brien TD
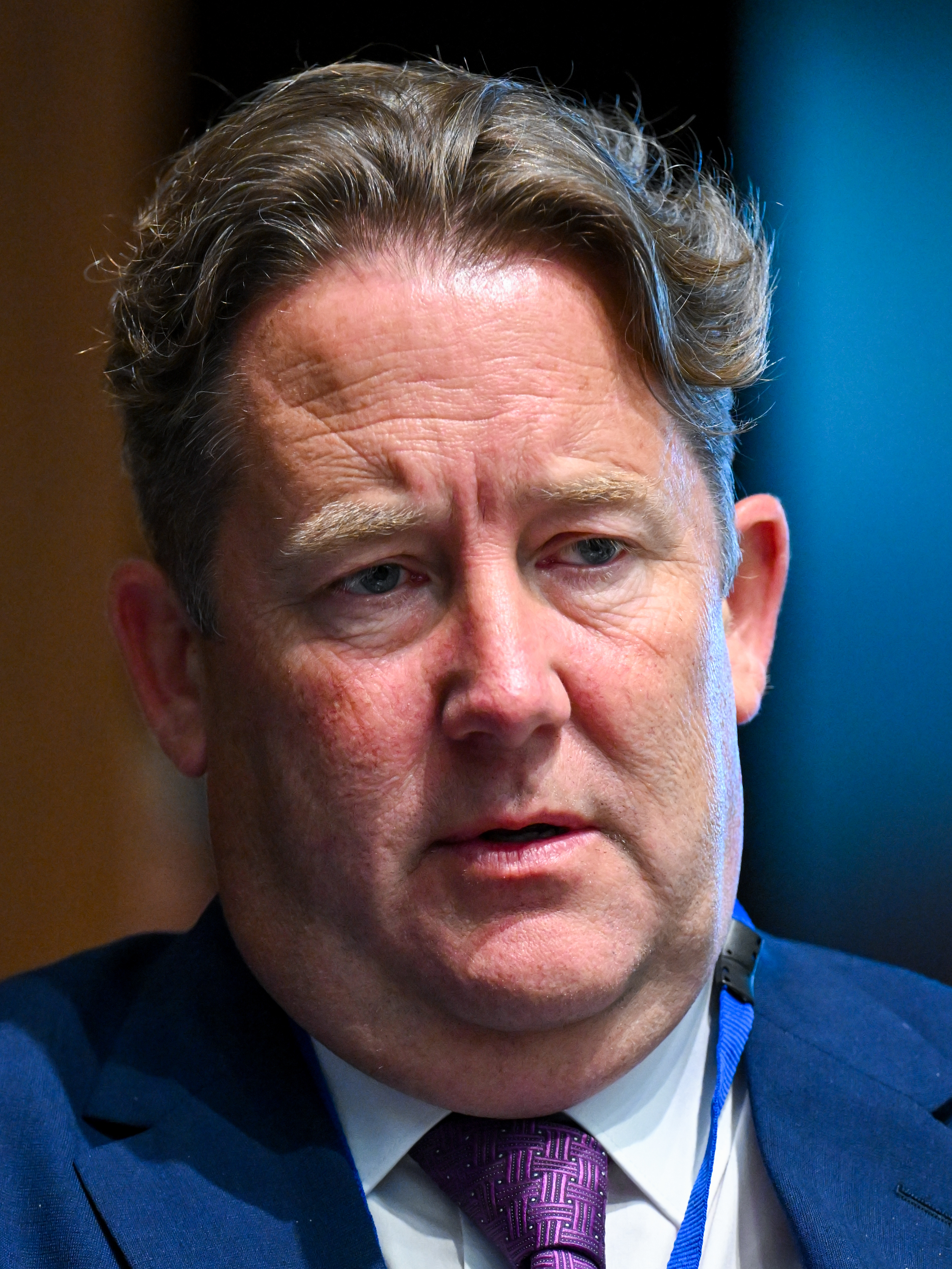
- O'Brien in 2025

Minister for Climate, Energy and the Environment
- Incumbent
- Assumed office 23 January 2025
- Taoiseach: Micheál Martin
- Preceded by: Eamon Ryan

Minister for Transport
- Incumbent
- Assumed office 23 January 2025
- Taoiseach: Micheál Martin
- Preceded by: Eamon Ryan

Minister for Housing, Local Government and Heritage
- In office 27 June 2020 – 23 January 2025
- Taoiseach: Micheál Martin; Leo Varadkar; Simon Harris
- Preceded by: Eoghan Murphy
- Succeeded by: James Browne

Leader of Fianna Fáil in the Seanad
- In office 30 April 2011 – 26 February 2016
- Leader: Micheál Martin
- Preceded by: Donie Cassidy
- Succeeded by: Catherine Ardagh

Teachta Dála
- Incumbent
- Assumed office November 2024
- Constituency: Dublin Fingal East
- In office February 2016 – November 2024
- Constituency: Dublin Fingal
- In office May 2007 – February 2011
- Constituency: Dublin North

Senator
- In office 25 May 2011 – 26 February 2016
- Constituency: Labour Panel
- In office 4 March 2011 – 25 May 2011
- Constituency: Nominated by the Taoiseach

Personal details
- Born: 8 July 1974 (age 52) Malahide, Dublin, Ireland
- Party: Fianna Fáil
- Spouse: Susan Maxwell (m. 2007)
- Children: 1
- Education: Institute of Technology, Carlow
- Website: darraghobrien.ie

Darragh O'Brien (born 8 July 1974) is an Irish Fianna Fáil politician who has served as government minister since 2020, as Minister for Housing, Local Government and Heritage from 2020 to 2025 and as Minister for Transport and Minister for Climate, Energy and the Environment since 2025. He has been a TD since 2016 for Dublin Fingal East (since 2024) and Dublin Fingal (2016 to 2024) and previously from 2007 to 2011 for Dublin North (2007 to 2011). He was a Senator on the Labour Panel from 2011 to 2016.

== Personal life ==
He was born and raised in Malahide, County Dublin, where he is an active member of St. Sylvesters GAA club, Malahide United F.C. and Malahide Rugby Club. As a child, O'Brien attended Pope John Paul II National Catholic School and then Malahide Community School (Pobalscoil Íosa). He is one of six children. His brother Eoghan O'Brien is a Fingal County Councillor, representing the Howth–Malahide local electoral area.

Before entering politics, he worked in the Pensions sector with Friends First Assurance Company. He lives in Malahide with his wife and daughter.

== Political career ==
He was co-opted to a seat on Fingal County Council in March 2004. He was then elected for Malahide at the 2004 Fingal County Council election.

O'Brien was first elected to Dáil Éireann at the 2007 general election. He was vice-chair of Public Accounts committee, Convenor on Joint Committee on Foreign Affairs during the 30th Dáil. He was also a member of Select Committee on Justice, Equality, Defence and Women's Rights. O'Brien was appointed to the Fianna Fáil frontbench as Spokesperson for Sport in January 2011.

He lost his seat in the 2011 general election. He was nominated by the Taoiseach Brian Cowen to the 23rd Seanad on 4 March 2011 to fill a vacancy. He was elected to the 24th Seanad on the Labour Panel in April 2011. He was the Fianna Fáil Seanad leader and spokesperson on Finance from 2011 to 2016.

He returned to the Dáil at the 2016 general election, winning a seat in the new constituency of Dublin Fingal. He was the Fianna Fáil spokesperson on Housing, Planning and Local Government until his appointment as Minister for Housing, Local Government and Heritage in June 2020.

O'Brien was re-elected at the 2020 general election. As part of the coalition government, O'Brien was appointed Minister for Housing, Local Government and Heritage by Taoiseach Micheál Martin on 27 June 2020. In his time as Minister for Housing, O'Brien presided over what has been described as "the worst housing crisis in over 40 years" by Fr. Peter McVerry of the Peter McVerry Trust, a national housing and homeless charity committed to reducing homelessness and the harm caused by substance misuse and social disadvantage.

On 13 December 2022, he survived a motion of no confidence in the Dáil by a vote of 86 to 63, with one abstention. On 17 December 2022, he was re-appointed to the same position following Leo Varadkar's appointment as Taoiseach.

In June 2023, O'Brien was appointed as Fianna Fáil's director of European elections for the 2024 European Parliament elections.

At the 2024 general election, O'Brien was re-elected to the Dáil for Dublin Fingal East. On 23 January 2025, he was appointed as Minister for Climate, Energy and the Environment and Minister for Transport in the government led by Micheál Martin.

Political offices
Preceded by Eoghan Murphy as Housing, Planning and Local Government	Minister for Housing, Local Government and Heritage; 2020–2025	Succeeded by James Browne
Preceded by Eamon Ryan	Minister for Transport; 2025–present	Incumbent
Preceded by Eamon Ryan	Minister for Climate, Energy and the Environment; 2025–present	Incumbent

Dáil	Election	Deputy (Party)	Deputy (Party)	Deputy (Party)	Deputy (Party)	Deputy (Party)	Deputy (Party)	Deputy (Party)	Deputy (Party)
4th	1923	Alfie Byrne (Ind.)	Francis Cahill (CnaG)	Margaret Collins-O'Driscoll (CnaG)	Seán McGarry (CnaG)	William Hewat (BP)	Richard Mulcahy (CnaG)	Seán T. O'Kelly (Rep)	Ernie O'Malley (Rep)
4th	1925 by-election	Alfie Byrne (Ind.)	Patrick Leonard (CnaG)	Margaret Collins-O'Driscoll (CnaG)	Oscar Traynor (Rep)	William Hewat (BP)	Richard Mulcahy (CnaG)	Seán T. O'Kelly (Rep)	Ernie O'Malley (Rep)
5th	1927 (Jun)	Alfie Byrne (Ind.)	John Byrne (CnaG)	Margaret Collins-O'Driscoll (CnaG)	Oscar Traynor (SF)	Denis Cullen (Lab)	Richard Mulcahy (CnaG)	Seán T. O'Kelly (FF)	Kathleen Clarke (FF)
6th	1927 (Sep)	Alfie Byrne (Ind.)	John Byrne (CnaG)	Margaret Collins-O'Driscoll (CnaG)	Patrick Leonard (CnaG)	James Larkin (IWL)	Richard Mulcahy (CnaG)	Seán T. O'Kelly (FF)	Eamonn Cooney (FF)
6th	1928 by-election	Alfie Byrne (Ind.)	John Byrne (CnaG)	Margaret Collins-O'Driscoll (CnaG)	Patrick Leonard (CnaG)	Vincent Rice (CnaG)	Richard Mulcahy (CnaG)	Seán T. O'Kelly (FF)	Eamonn Cooney (FF)
6th	1929 by-election	Thomas F. O'Higgins (CnaG)	John Byrne (CnaG)	Margaret Collins-O'Driscoll (CnaG)	Patrick Leonard (CnaG)	Vincent Rice (CnaG)	Richard Mulcahy (CnaG)	Seán T. O'Kelly (FF)	Eamonn Cooney (FF)
7th	1932	Alfie Byrne (Ind.)	John Byrne (CnaG)	Margaret Collins-O'Driscoll (CnaG)	Oscar Traynor (FF)	Cormac Breathnach (FF)	Richard Mulcahy (CnaG)	Seán T. O'Kelly (FF)	Eamonn Cooney (FF)
8th	1933	Alfie Byrne (Ind.)	Patrick Belton (CnaG)	Vincent Rice (CnaG)	Oscar Traynor (FF)	Cormac Breathnach (FF)	Richard Mulcahy (CnaG)	Seán T. O'Kelly (FF)	Eamonn Cooney (FF)
9th	1937	Constituency abolished. See Dublin North-East and Dublin North-West							

Dáil	Election	Deputy (Party)	Deputy (Party)	Deputy (Party)	Deputy (Party)
22nd	1981	Ray Burke (FF)	John Boland (FG)	Nora Owen (FG)	3 seats 1981–1992
23rd	1982 (Feb)	Ray Burke (FF)	John Boland (FG)	Nora Owen (FG)	3 seats 1981–1992
24th	1982 (Nov)	Ray Burke (FF)	John Boland (FG)	Nora Owen (FG)	3 seats 1981–1992
25th	1987	Ray Burke (FF)	John Boland (FG)	G. V. Wright (FF)	3 seats 1981–1992
26th	1989	Ray Burke (FF)	Nora Owen (FG)	Seán Ryan (Lab)	3 seats 1981–1992
27th	1992	Ray Burke (FF)	Nora Owen (FG)	Seán Ryan (Lab)	Trevor Sargent (GP)
28th	1997	Ray Burke (FF)	Nora Owen (FG)	G. V. Wright (FF)	Trevor Sargent (GP)
28th	1998 by-election	Seán Ryan (Lab)	Nora Owen (FG)	G. V. Wright (FF)	Trevor Sargent (GP)
29th	2002	Seán Ryan (Lab)	Jim Glennon (FF)	G. V. Wright (FF)	Trevor Sargent (GP)
30th	2007	James Reilly (FG)	Michael Kennedy (FF)	Darragh O'Brien (FF)	Trevor Sargent (GP)
31st	2011	James Reilly (FG)	Alan Farrell (FG)	Brendan Ryan (Lab)	Clare Daly (SP)
32nd	2016	Constituency abolished. See Dublin Fingal			

Dáil	Election	Deputy (Party)	Deputy (Party)	Deputy (Party)	Deputy (Party)	Deputy (Party)
32nd	2016	Louise O'Reilly (SF)	Clare Daly (I4C)	Brendan Ryan (Lab)	Darragh O'Brien (FF)	Alan Farrell (FG)
32nd	2019 by-election	Louise O'Reilly (SF)	Joe O'Brien (GP)	Brendan Ryan (Lab)	Darragh O'Brien (FF)	Alan Farrell (FG)
33rd	2020	Louise O'Reilly (SF)	Joe O'Brien (GP)	Duncan Smith (Lab)	Darragh O'Brien (FF)	Alan Farrell (FG)
34th	2024	Constituency abolished. See Dublin Fingal East and Dublin Fingal West.				

Dáil	Election	Deputy (Party)	Deputy (Party)	Deputy (Party)
34th	2024	Darragh O'Brien (FF)	Duncan Smith (Lab)	Ann Graves (SF)
