= NORAID =

Irish American membership organization

- Irish Northern Aid Committee
- NORAID logo
- Formation: 1969
- Founder: Michael Flannery
- Headquarters: Pearl River, New York
- Origins: Northern Ireland civil rights movement, The Troubles
- Services: Fundraising, Irish language education, Republican activism
- Main organ: The Irish People
- Website: irishnorthernaid.com

NORAID, officially the Irish Northern Aid Committee, is an Irish American membership organization founded after the start of the Troubles in Northern Ireland in 1969. The organization states its mission is to aid in the creation of a United Ireland in the spirit of the 1916 Easter Proclamation and to support the Northern Ireland Peace process.

During the Troubles, NORAID was known for raising funds for the Provisional Irish Republican Army and nationalist relief groups such as Green Cross and An Cumann Cabrach.

== History ==
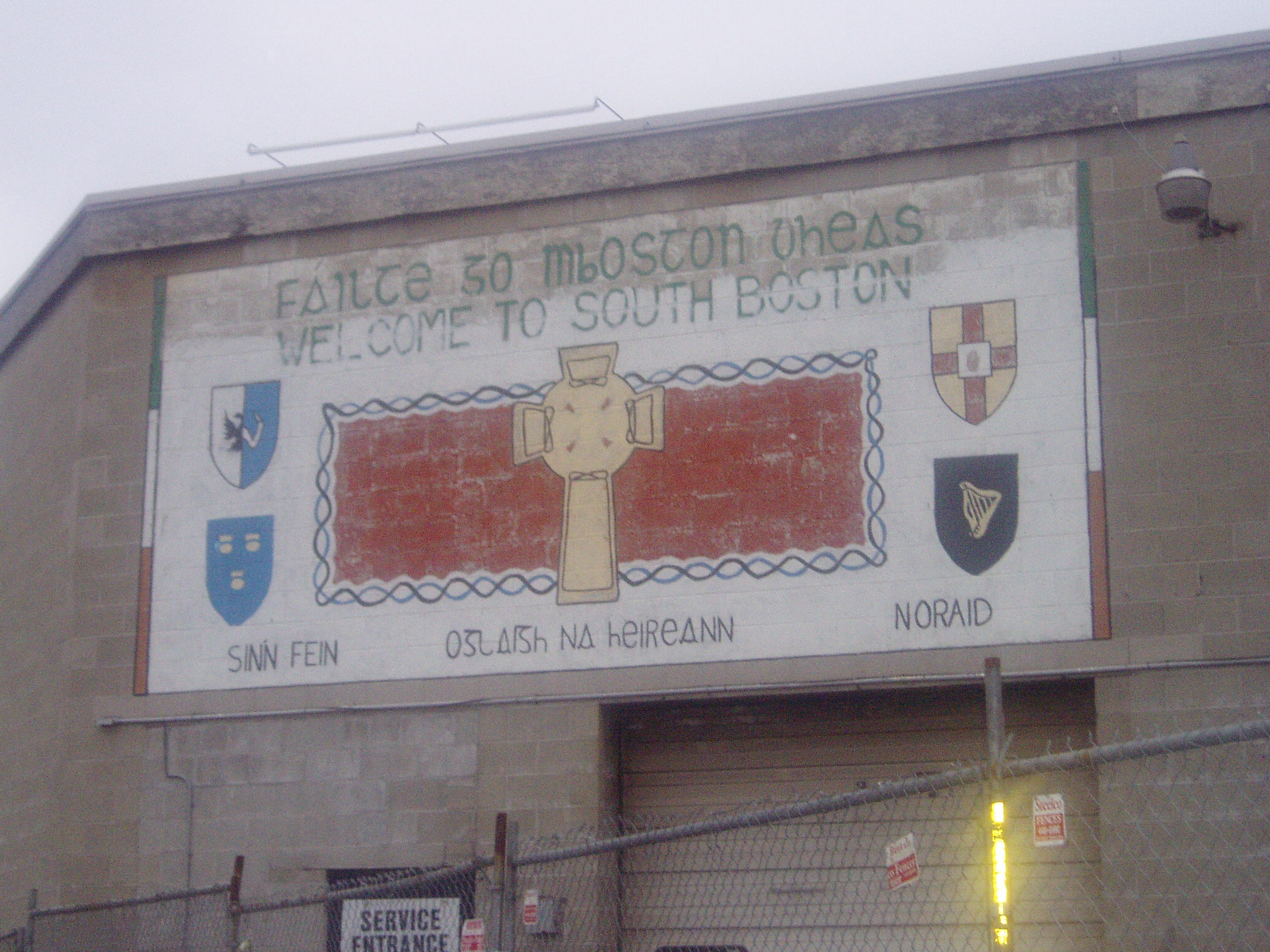
A mural in South Boston saying "Welcome to South Boston" in English and "Fáilte go mBoston dheas" in Irish. Also shown is a Celtic cross, the coats of arms of the Provinces of Ireland and the words "Sinn Féin", Óglaigh na hÉireann and "NORAID". The mural was torn down along with the building to make way for residential housing.

NORAID was organized and directed by Irish immigrant Michael Flannery, who in the 1920s was a member of the IRA North Tipperary Brigade. To collect funds, NORAID organized dinner dances, donations in Irish bars, and direct-mail appeals for support in humanitarian relief in Ireland during the Troubles, raising up to $3 million from 1970 to 1985.

NORAID officials maintained that its money went to two Irish relief organizations, Green Cross (founded in 1973) and An Cumann Cabrach (founded in November 1953), to help families of imprisoned or dead Irish nationalists. However, Unionist politicians, much of the Irish American community, and the British, Irish and United States governments accused NORAID of being a front for the Provisional Irish Republican Army (IRA), and that it was involved in fundraising for IRA arms importation from North America since the early 1970s. Historian Ed Moloney disputed this by saying that funds raised by NORAID went largely to the families of imprisoned IRA volunteers, and that Clan na Gael was the principal financial backer of the IRA.

In May 1981, the United States Department of Justice won a court case forcing NORAID to register the IRA as its "foreign principal" under the Foreign Agents Registration Act. In his decision, U.S. District Judge Charles S. Haight Jr. wrote: "The uncontroverted evidence is that [NORAID] is an agent of the IRA, providing money and services for other than relief purposes." NORAID lawyers appealed the decision but lost. After three years of fighting, a compromise was reached between federal attorneys and NORAID, allowing it to include with its filings a written statement expressing that the document had been signed under duress and that NORAID maintained that the IRA was not its "foreign principal". NORAID resumed filing its financial returns in July 1984.

By the late 1980s, NORAID was a loose federation of local branches centered on fundraising. Sinn Féin, the political party associated with the IRA, wanted NORAID to expand its activities. At the end of 1988, NORAID agreed to try to broaden its appeal and its executive committee was expanded. Sinn Féin sent an organizer to the United States, and more time and money was devoted to lobbying.

Then-president Pat O'Connell said "Americans are fed up with their own nation's politics. They sure as hell don't want to get involved in Irish politics. They only want to give money for the prisoners and their families, not for political lobbying." O'Connell subsequently opened a separate NORAID office in the Bronx.

A letter later published in New York's two Irish weeklies charged that under Martin Galvin and others, NORAID was "being steered in a direction toward politics and away from its original humanitarian objectives". The first name among 41 signers was Michael Flannery, who in 1986 had quietly resigned from NORAID.

Galvin joined NORAID in the early 1970s, and became the committee's publicity director and editor of its weekly newspaper, The Irish People. He later joined the group's board of directors. In 1989, Pat O'Connell left NORAID following ideological disagreements with Galvin and founded The Friends of Irish Freedom later that year despite objections from Sinn Féin.

Galvin split with Sinn Féin in the mid-1990s over the direction of the Northern Ireland peace process.

NORAID has in the past supported "Project Children", a New York-based organization founded in 1975, to provide summer vacations for children from Northern Ireland away from sectarian strife.

In 1994, Sinn Féin was de-listed as a foreign terrorist organization by the US State Department after the start of peace efforts in Northern Ireland. NORAID was supportive of the peace process and the subsequent Good Friday Agreement. In the 21st century NORAID has become highly supportive of Sinn Féin.

NORAID published the final issue of The Irish People on March 13, 2004.

== See also ==
- Friends of Sinn Féin
- Irish Republican Socialist Committees of North America
- Troops Out Movement
