= Michael Flannery =

Irish Republican and founder of NORAID

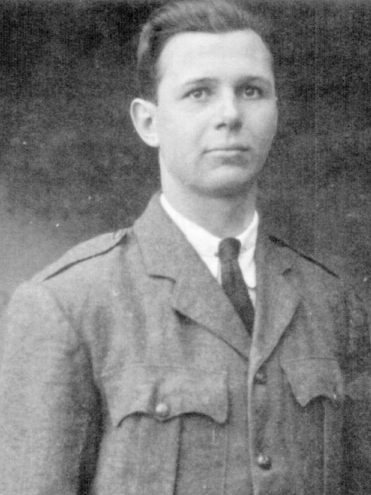
- Flannery in 1921

Personal details
- Born: 7 January 1903 Cangort, near Brosna, County Offaly, Ireland
- Died: 30 September 1994 (aged 91) New York City, New York, United States of America
- Resting place: Mount Saint Mary's Cemetery in Flushing, New York.
- Party: Sinn Féin, Republican Sinn Fein
- Spouse: Margaret Mary Egan ("Pearl") (m. 1928; died 1991)

Military service
- Branch/service: Irish Republican Army; Anti-Treaty IRA
- Years of service: 1919–1922
- Unit: Tipperary No. 1 Brigade
- Battles/wars: Irish War of Independence; Irish Civil War

Michael Flannery (7 January 1903 – 30 September 1994) was an Irish military officer and founder of the Irish Northern Aid Committee (NORAID), an Irish American membership organization that supported the Provisional IRA during the Troubles.

Flannery was a veteran of the Irish War of Independence and the Irish Civil War, and was also a member of the Cumann na Saoirse after the Republican Sinn Féin and Provisional Sinn Féin split in 1986.

== Early life and role in the Irish revolutionary period ==
Flannery was born in Cangort, near Brosna, right on the border of County Offaly and County Tipperary, on 7 January 1903.

In 1916, he joined the Irish Volunteers alongside his brother Peter, although he did not take part in the Easter Rising. However, he did participate in the Irish War of Independence. Following the outbreak of the Irish Civil War, he fought as part of the Anti-Treaty IRA until his capture by the National Army on 11 November 1922 in Roscrea, County Tipperary. He was imprisoned for nearly a year and a half in Dublin's Mountjoy Prison (C Wing). While there, he witnessed the execution of Anti-Treaty IRA leaders Richard Barrett, Joe McKelvey, Liam Mellows and Rory O'Connor from his cell window. Following Flannery going on a 28-day hunger strike, he was placed in the Curragh Prison Camp until 1 May 1924 when he was finally released, a full year after the end of the civil war.

== Emigration to the United States ==
In February 1927, he emigrated to the United States, settling in Jackson Heights, Queens, New York City. In 1928, he married Margaret Mary Egan, an Irish-born research chemist from Tipperary, who had been educated at University College Dublin and University of Geneva.

Following the creation of Fianna Fáil and their entry into the Irish Parliament Dáil Éireann, Flannery became affiliated with Sinn Féin, who had voted to retain their abstentionist policy towards the Dáil and their refusal to acknowledge it as the legitimate government of Ireland. Sinn Féin tasked Flannery with drumming up support for the party in New York. However, following the start of the Great Depression, Flannery found it difficult to focus on politics in the face of mounting poverty. By 1933 finding support for Sinn Féin and the IRA became particularly tough when Fianna Fáil expanded greatly the range of people eligible for military pensions, which under the previous government had been biased against members of the Anti-Treaty IRA.

For the next 40 years, Flannery would work for the Metropolitan Life Insurance Company.

== Role during the Troubles and later life ==
Upon the onset of The Troubles in Northern Ireland, Flannery was once again drawn into the world of Irish Republicanism. In response to the mounting violence, Flannery set up the Irish Northern Aid Committee, or as it became better known as NORAID. The official purpose of NORAID was to provide funds to the families of imprisoned Irish Republicans and victims of violence. However, opponents leveled the accusation against the organisation that it was also a front for the Provisional Irish Republican Army by using donations to supply firearms.

In 1970, he traveled around America and set up 62 chapters of NORAID. In 1971, he said: "The more coffins sent back to Britain, the sooner this will be all over," referring to British soldiers.

In 1982, he was indicted, with four other Irish immigrants (Thomas Falvey, Daniel Gormley, George Harrison and Patrick Mullin), for arms smuggling, but all defendants were acquitted after their legal defence was able to successfully argue their actions had been sanctioned by the Central Intelligence Agency (CIA). During the trial, Flannery said himself that:

I came [to the US] directly from Ireland. I was a member of the Irish Republican Army until I left Ireland. When I came here, there had been a general exodus of young Irishmen and women from Ireland from 1924 to 1927 and I came here purposely to organise these people so they would be a help to the militant movement, to the IRA at home, to complete the freedom of Ireland.

In spite of the men's acquittal, the indictment led to severe disruption of the IRA arms procurement in America so the IRA focused much on importing commercial weapons from mainland Europe and the Middle East.

Four months after the verdict of the arms trial, Flannery was named by the Ancient Order of Hibernians (the largest Irish Catholic fraternal organization in America) as Grand Marshall of the St. Patrick's Day Parade in New York City. His appointment was widely condemned by the Irish American majority, the press, and the U.S. government. Figures and institutions boycotted the parade that year, including the Archbishop of New York Terence Cooke, Irish American politicians such as "The Four Horsemen" (Ted Kennedy, Tip O’Neill, Daniel Patrick Moynihan and Hugh Carey) and members of the Friends of Ireland, and U.S. Army and high school bands.

In 1986, Flannery quietly resigned from NORAID following the decision by Sinn Féin to drop its abstentionist policy in the Republic of Ireland and to recognise Dáil Éireann as the legitimate governing body of Ireland. Michael Flannery joined with veteran Republicans, including Joe Stynes and George Harrison to form Cumann na Saoirse.

He opposed the Northern Ireland peace process, believing that Sinn Féin and the Provisionals had "sold out", and believed the removal of British troops from Northern Ireland was the only starting point upon which negotiations could begin.

He died on 30 September 1994, aged 91. From 1970 to 1991, NORAID was estimated to have raised $3.6 million: $3 million by 1986 and $600,000 by 1991. Historians, scholars, and IRA veterans said the total amount raised in America for the Provisional cause had been exaggerated and only formed a small portion of IRA income, pointing out that nearly all of the IRA money came from legitimate and criminal activities within the Republic of Ireland and Northern Ireland.
