= List of current Sinn Féin elected representatives =

This is a list of currently elected Sinn Féin representatives.

== Members of Dáil Éireann ==
Sinn Féin has 39 TDs in Dáil Éireann (lower house) (most recent election in 2024):

- Mary Lou McDonald, TD for Dublin Central
- Denise Mitchell, TD for Dublin Bay North
- Ann Graves, TD for Dublin Fingal East
- Louise O'Reilly, TD for Dublin Fingal West
- Eoin Ó Broin, TD for Dublin Mid-West
- Mark Ward, TD for Dublin Mid-West
- Dessie Ellis, TD for Dublin North-West
- Paul Donnelly, TD for Dublin West
- Aengus Ó Snodaigh, TD for Dublin South-Central
- Máire Devine, TD for Dublin South-Central
- Seán Crowe, TD for Dublin South-West
- Natasha Newsome Drennan, TD for Carlow–Kilkenny
- Matt Carthy, TD for Cavan–Monaghan
- Cathy Bennett, TD for Cavan–Monaghan
- Donna McGettigan, TD for Clare
- Pat Buckley, TD for Cork East
- Thomas Gould, TD for Cork North-Central
- Donnchadh Ó Laoghaire, TD for Cork South-Central
- Pádraig Mac Lochlainn, TD for Donegal
- Pearse Doherty, TD for Donegal
- Louis O'Hara, TD for Galway East
- Mairéad Farrell, TD for Galway West
- Réada Cronin, TD for Kildare North
- Shónagh Ní Raghallaigh, TD for Kildare South
- Pa Daly, TD for Kerry
- Maurice Quinlivan, TD for Limerick City
- Sorca Clarke, TD for Longford–Westmeath
- Joanna Byrne, TD for Louth
- Ruairí Ó Murchú, TD for Louth
- Rose Conway-Walsh, TD for Mayo
- Darren O'Rourke, TD for Meath East
- Johnny Guirke, TD for Meath West
- Claire Kerrane, TD for Roscommon–Galway
- Martin Kenny, TD for Sligo–Leitrim
- David Cullinane, TD for Waterford
- Conor D. McGuinness, TD for Waterford
- Johnny Mythen, TD for Wexford
- John Brady, TD for Wicklow
- Fionntán Ó Súilleabháin, TD for Wicklow–Wexford

== Members of Seanad Éireann ==
Sinn Féin has six senators in Seanad Éireann (upper house) following the most recent election in 2025.

- Chris Andrews, Labour Panel
- Pauline Tully, Cultural and Educational Panel
- Joanne Collins, Agricultural Panel
- Maria McCormack, Labour Panel
- Conor Murphy, Industrial and Commercial Panel
- Nicole Ryan, Administrative Panel

== Members of the Northern Ireland Assembly ==
Sinn Féin have 27 MLAs in the Northern Ireland Assembly (most recent election in 2022):

- Carál Ní Chuilín, MLA for Belfast North
- Gerry Kelly, MLA for Belfast North
- Deirdre Hargey, MLA for Belfast South
- Órlaithí Flynn, MLA for Belfast West
- Danny Baker, MLA for Belfast West
- Pat Sheehan, MLA for Belfast West
- Aisling Reilly, MLA for Belfast West
- Caoimhe Archibald, MLA for East Londonderry
- Jemma Dolan, MLA for Fermanagh and South Tyrone
- Colm Gildernew, MLA for Fermanagh and South Tyrone
- Áine Murphy, MLA for Fermanagh and South Tyrone
- Ciara Ferguson, MLA for Foyle
- Pádraig Delargy, MLA for Foyle
- Emma Sheerin, MLA for Mid Ulster
- Michelle O'Neill, MLA for Mid Ulster
- Linda Dillon, MLA for Mid Ulster
- Cathal Boylan, MLA for Newry and Armagh
- Aoife Finnegan, MLA for Newry and Armagh
- Liz Kimmins, MLA for Newry and Armagh
- Philip McGuigan, MLA for North Antrim
- Declan Kearney, MLA for South Antrim
- Sinéad Ennis, MLA for South Down
- Cathy Mason, MLA for South Down
- John O'Dowd, MLA for Upper Bann
- Maoliosa McHugh, MLA for West Tyrone
- Declan McAleer, MLA for West Tyrone
- Nicola Brogan, MLA for West Tyrone

== Members of the United Kingdom Parliament ==
Sinn Féin has seven MPs (most recent election in 2024):

- Pat Cullen, MP for Fermanagh and South Tyrone
- Órfhlaith Begley, MP for West Tyrone
- Cathal Mallaghan, MP for Mid Ulster
- Dáire Hughes, MP for Newry and Armagh
- Paul Maskey, MP for Belfast West
- Chris Hazzard, MP for South Down
- John Finucane, MP for Belfast North

All Sinn Féin MPs follow an abstentionist policy with regard to Westminster, meaning they do not take their seats in that parliament.

== Members of the European Parliament ==
Sinn Féin has two MEPs (most recent election in 2024):

- Lynn Boylan, MEP for Dublin (European Parliament constituency)
- Kathleen Funchion, MEP for South (European Parliament constituency)
