= Friends of Sinn Féin =

Non-profit organisations in partnership with Irish political party Sinn Féin

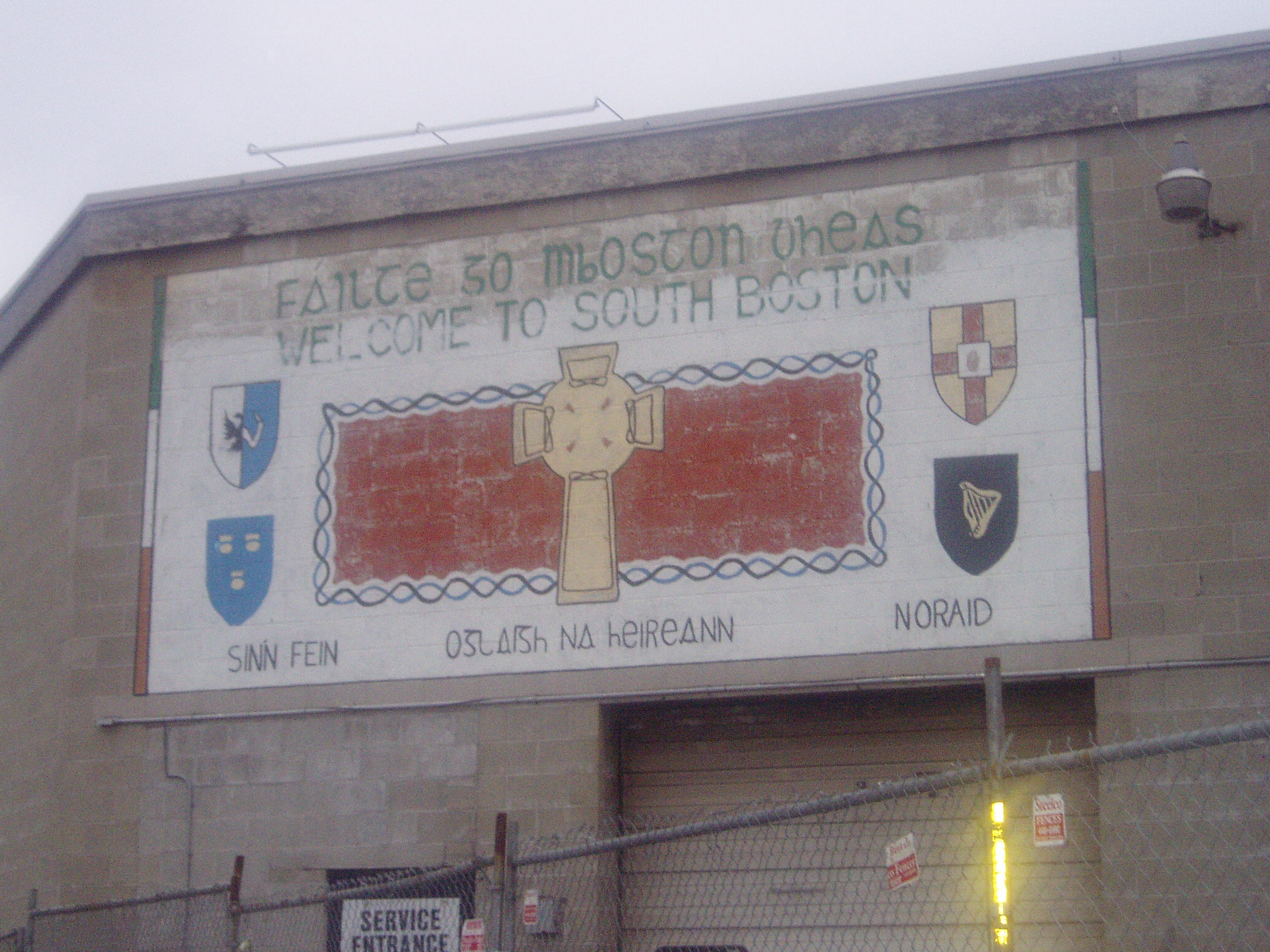
Mural in South Boston saying "Welcome to South Boston" in English and "Fáilte go mBoston dheas" in Irish. Also shown is a Celtic cross, the coats of arms of the Provinces of Ireland and the words "Sinn Féin", "Óglaigh na hÉireann" and "NORAID." This mural has since been torn down along with the building to make way for resident housing.

The Friends of Sinn Féin (Irish: Cairde Shinn Féin) is the name of six different Irish republican political non-profit organisations located in Scotland, England, Wales, Canada, Australia and the United States. Friends of Sinn Féin USA, located in New York City, is the largest and most successful.

Each FOSF is associated with the political party Sinn Féin, and works with the Irish-Scots, Irish-English, Irish-Canadian, Irish-Australian and Irish-American communities to foster good relations between the Sinn Féin party and the governments of those countries. Many Sinn Féin politicians engage in international speaking tours to raise support for their party. This was seen in 2014 in Australia, with Mary Lou McDonald TD and Francie Molloy MP visiting Australia and helping raise support with Irish Australians. The FOSF USA organisation is one of the chief fund-raising sources for Sinn Féin. In 2008 it was reported that FOSF USA remains one of the major contributors and a "key source of funds" for the party.

== See also ==
- NORAID
- Irish Republican Socialist Committees of North America
- Troops Out Movement
