= Sinn Féin =

Political party in Ireland

- President: Mary Lou McDonald
- Vice president: Michelle O'Neill
- Chairperson: Declan Kearney
- General Secretary: Sam Baker
- Seanad leader: Conor Murphy
- Founder: Arthur Griffith
- Founded: 28 November 1905; 120 years ago (original form); 17 January 1970; 56 years ago (current form)
- Merger of: National Council; Cumann na nGaedheal; Dungannon Clubs
- Split from: Official Sinn Féin (Note: The organisation from which Provisional Sinn Féin split was formally Sinn Féin at the time of the 1970 split. Official Sinn Féin was the distinguishing name used for the majority (Gardiner Place) faction; it later renamed itself Sinn Féin – The Workers' Party and then The Workers' Party.)
- Preceded by: Provisional Sinn Féin
- Headquarters: 44 Parnell Square, Dublin, Ireland
- Newspaper: An Phoblacht
- Youth wing: Ógra Shinn Féin
- LGBT wing: Sinn Féin LGBTQIA+
- Overseas wing: Friends of Sinn Féin
- Membership (2024): ~10,000
- Ideology: Irish republicanism; Democratic socialism; Left-wing nationalism
- Political position: Centre-left to left-wing
- European affiliation: Unified European Left
- European Parliament group: The Left in the European Parliament
- Colours: Green
- Slogan: Tosaíonn athrú anseo ('Change starts here')
- Dáil Éireann: 39 / 174
- Seanad Éireann: 6 / 60
- European Parliament: 2 / 14
- Northern Ireland Assembly: 27 / 90
- House of Commons (NI seats): 7 / 18 (abstentionist)
- Councillors in the Republic of Ireland: 99 / 949
- Councils led in the Republic of Ireland: 2 / 31
- Local government in Northern Ireland: 144 / 462
- Councils led in Northern Ireland: 6 / 11

Website
- sinnfein.ie

Sinn Féin (/ʃɪn ˈfeɪn/ shin FAYN; Irish: [ˌʃɪn̠ʲ ˈfʲeːnʲ]; lit. '[We] Ourselves') is an Irish republican and democratic socialist political party active in Ireland, including both the Republic of Ireland and Northern Ireland.

The original Sinn Féin organisation was founded in 1905 by Arthur Griffith. Its members founded the revolutionary Irish Republic and its parliament, the First Dáil, and many of them were active in the Irish War of Independence, during which the party was associated with the Irish Republican Army (1919–1922). The party split before the Irish Civil War and again in its aftermath, giving rise to the two traditionally dominant parties of Irish politics: Fianna Fáil, and Cumann na nGaedheal (which merged with smaller groups to form Fine Gael). For several decades the remaining Sinn Féin organisation was small and often without parliamentary representation. It continued its association with the Irish Republican Army. Another split in 1970 at the start of the Troubles led to the modern Sinn Féin party, with the other faction eventually becoming the Workers' Party.

During the Troubles, Sinn Féin was associated with the Provisional Irish Republican Army. For most of that conflict, it was affected by broadcasting bans in the Irish and British media. Although the party sat on local councils, it maintained a policy of abstentionism for the British House of Commons and the Irish Dáil Éireann, standing for election to those legislatures but pledging not to take their seats if elected. After Gerry Adams became party leader in 1983, electoral politics were prioritised increasingly. In 1986, the party dropped its abstentionist policy for the Dáil; some members formed Republican Sinn Féin in protest. In the 1990s, Sinn Féin—under the leadership of Adams and Martin McGuinness—was involved in the Northern Ireland peace process. This led to the Good Friday Agreement and created the Northern Ireland Assembly, and saw Sinn Féin become part of the power-sharing Northern Ireland Executive. In 2006, it co-signed the St Andrews Agreement and agreed to support the Police Service of Northern Ireland.

Sinn Féin is the largest party in the Northern Ireland Assembly, having won the largest share of first-preference votes and the most seats in the 2022 election, the first time an Irish nationalist party has done so. Since 2024, Michelle O'Neill has served as the first ever Irish nationalist First Minister of Northern Ireland. From 2007 to 2022, Sinn Féin was the second-largest party in the Assembly, after the Democratic Unionist Party (DUP), and its nominees served as Deputy First Minister in the Northern Ireland Executive.

In the House of Commons of the United Kingdom, Sinn Féin has held seven of Northern Ireland's seats since the 2024 election; it continues its policy of abstentionism at Westminster. In Dáil Éireann it is the main opposition, having won the second largest number of seats in the 2024 election. The current president of Sinn Féin is Mary Lou McDonald, who succeeded Gerry Adams in 2018.

== Name ==
The phrase "Sinn Féin" is Irish for "Ourselves" or "We Ourselves", although it is frequently mistranslated as "ourselves alone" (from "Sinn Féin Amháin", an early-20th-century slogan). The name is an assertion of Irish national sovereignty and self-determination, i.e., the Irish people governing themselves, rather than being part of a political union with Great Britain under the Westminster Parliament.

A split in January 1970, mirroring a split in the IRA, led to the emergence of two groups calling themselves Sinn Féin. The majority group, under the continued leadership of Tomás Mac Giolla, became known as Official Sinn Féin or Sinn Féin (Gardiner Place). The minority group, led by Ruairí Ó Brádaigh, became known as Provisional Sinn Féin or Sinn Féin (Kevin Street). Official Sinn Féin changed its name to Sinn Féin-The Workers' Party in 1977, and in 1982 it changed its name to The Workers' Party. As the "Official" group had dropped all mention of Sinn Féin from its name in 1982, the term "Provisional Sinn Féin" fell out of use, and in 1987 Provisional Sinn Féin registered as a political party in the Republic of Ireland under the name Sinn Féin.

Sinn Féin members have been referred to colloquially as "Shinners", a term intended as a pejorative.

== History ==
=== 1905–1922 ===
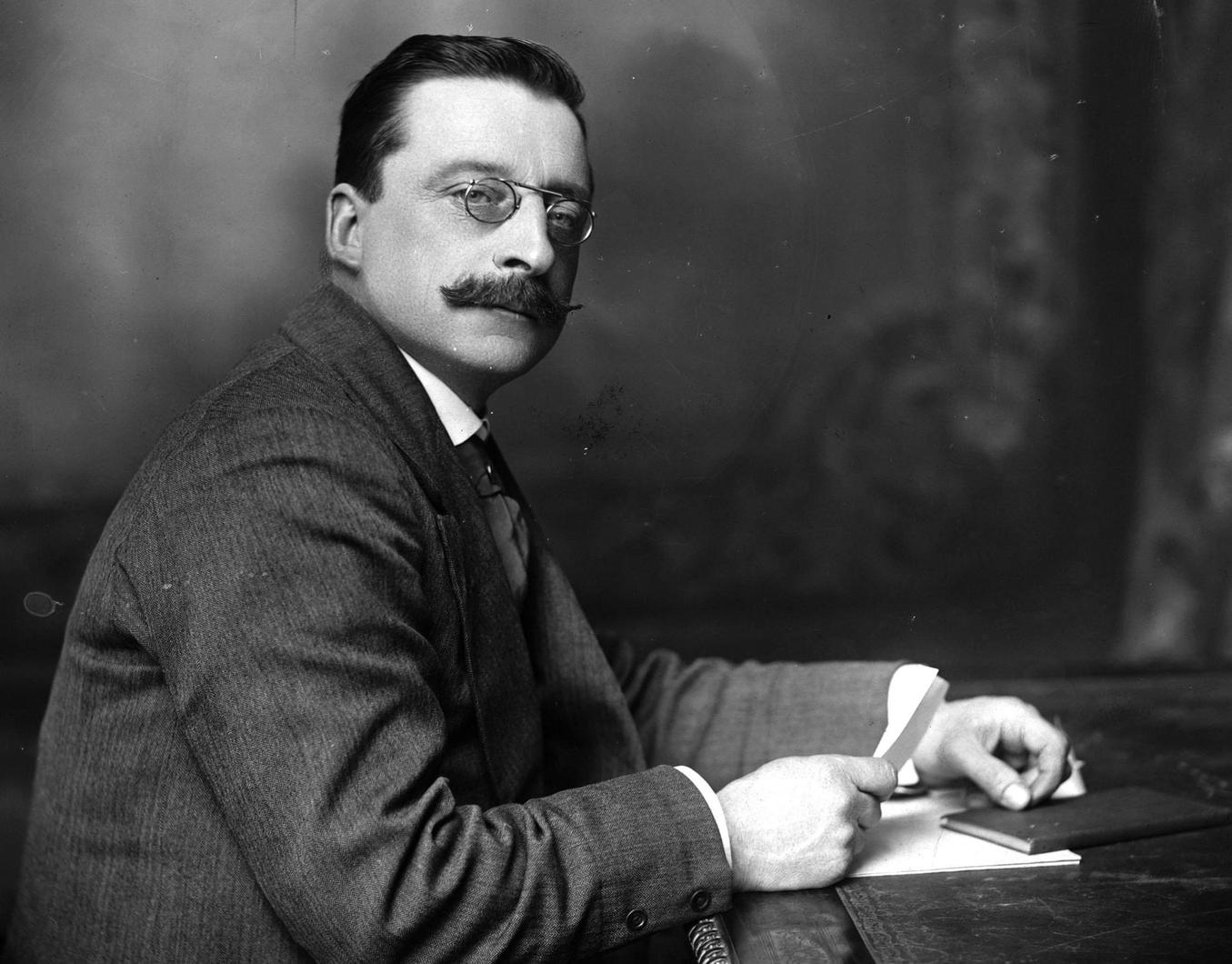
Arthur Griffith is credited as the main founder of the party

Sinn Féin was founded on 28 November 1905, when, at the first annual Convention of the National Council, Arthur Griffith outlined the Sinn Féin policy, "to establish in Ireland's capital a national legislature endowed with the moral authority of the Irish nation". Its initial political platform was both conservative and monarchist, advocating for an Anglo-Irish dual monarchy unified with the British Crown (inspired by the Austro-Hungarian Compromise of 1867). The party contested the 1908 North Leitrim by-election, where it secured 27% of the vote. Thereafter, both support and membership fell. At its 1910 ard fheis (party conference) attendance was poor, and there was difficulty finding members willing to take seats on the executive.

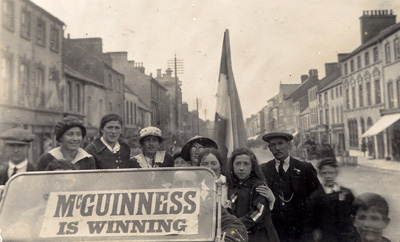
The campaign car of Joseph McGuinness, who won the 1917 South Longford by-election whilst imprisoned. He was one of the first Sinn Féin MPs to be elected.

In 1914, Sinn Féin members, including Griffith, joined the anti-Redmond Irish Volunteers, which was referred to by Redmondites and others as the "Sinn Féin Volunteers". Although Griffith himself did not take part in the Easter Rising of 1916, many Sinn Féin members who were members of the Volunteers and the Irish Republican Brotherhood did. Government and newspapers dubbed the Rising "the Sinn Féin Rising". After the Rising, republicans came together under the banner of Sinn Féin, and at the 1917 ard fheis the party committed itself for the first time to the establishment of an Irish Republic. In the 1918 general election, Sinn Féin won 73 of Ireland's 105 seats, and in January 1919, its MPs assembled in Dublin and proclaimed themselves Dáil Éireann, the parliament of Ireland. Sinn Féin candidate Constance Markievicz became the first woman elected to the United Kingdom House of Commons. However, in line with Sinn Féin abstentionist policy, she did not take her seat in the House of Commons.

The party supported the Irish Republican Army during the War of Independence, and members of the Dáil government negotiated the Anglo-Irish Treaty with the British government in 1921. In the Dáil debates that followed, the party divided on the Treaty. The pro-Treaty and anti-Treaty components (led by Michael Collins and Éamon de Valera respectively) managed to agree on a "Coalition Panel" of Sinn Féin candidates to stand in the 1922 general election. After the election, anti-Treaty members walked out of the Dáil, and pro- and anti-Treaty members took opposite sides in the ensuing Civil War.

=== 1923–1970 ===
Pro-Treaty Dáil deputies and other Treaty supporters formed a new party, Cumann na nGaedheal, on 27 April 1923 at a meeting in Dublin, where delegates agreed on a constitution and political programme. Cumann na nGaedheal went on to govern the new Irish Free State for nine years (it merged with two other organisations to form Fine Gael in 1933). Anti-Treaty Sinn Féin members continued to boycott the Dáil. At a special Ard Fheis in March 1926, de Valera proposed that elected members be allowed to take their seats in the Dáil if and when the controversial Oath of Allegiance was removed. When his motion was defeated, de Valera resigned from Sinn Féin; on 16 May 1926, he founded his own party, Fianna Fáil, which was dedicated to republicanising the Free State from within its political structures. He took most Sinn Féin Teachtaí Dála (TDs) with him. De Valera's resignation meant also the loss of financial support from America. The rump Sinn Féin party could field no more than fifteen candidates, and won only five seats in the June 1927 general election, a decline in support not seen since before 1916. Vice-president and de facto leader Mary MacSwiney announced that the party simply did not have the funds to contest the second election called that year, declaring "no true Irish citizen can vote for any of the other parties". Fianna Fáil came to power at the 1932 general election (to begin what would be an unbroken 16-year spell in government) and went on to long dominate politics in the independent Irish state.

An attempt in the 1940s to access funds that had been put in the care of the High Court led to the Sinn Féin Funds case, which the party lost and in which the judge ruled that it was not the legal successor to the Sinn Féin of 1917.

By the late 1940s, two decades removed from the Fianna Fáil split and now the Sinn Féin funds lost, the party was little more than a husk. The emergence of a popular new republican party, led by former IRA members, in Clann na Poblachta, threatened to void any remaining purpose Sinn Féin had left. However, it was around this same time that the IRA leadership once again sought to have a political arm (the IRA and Sinn Féin had effectively no formal ties following the civil war). Following an IRA army convention in 1948, IRA members were instructed to join Sinn Féin en masse and by 1950 they had successfully taken total control of the party, with IRA army council member Paddy McLogan named as the new president of the party. As part of this rapprochement, it was later made clear by the army council that the IRA would dictate to Sinn Féin, and not the other way around.

At the 1955 United Kingdom general election, two Sinn Féin candidates were elected to Westminster, and likewise, four members of Sinn Féin were elected to Leinster House in the 1957 Irish general election. In December 1956, at the beginning of the IRA's Border Campaign (Operation Harvest), the Northern Ireland Government banned Sinn Féin under the Special Powers Act; it would remain banned until 1974. By the end of the Border campaign five years later, the party had once again lost all national representation. Through the 1960s, some leading figures in the movement, such as Cathal Goulding, Seán Garland, Billy McMillen and Tomás Mac Giolla, moved steadily to the left, even to Marxism, as a result of their own reading and thinking and contacts with the Irish and international left. This angered more traditional republicans, who wanted to stick to the national question and armed struggle. The Garland Commission was set up in 1967, to investigate the possibility of ending abstentionism. Its report angered the already disaffected traditional republican element within the party, notably Seán Mac Stíofáin and Ruairí Ó Brádaigh, who viewed such a policy as treason against the Irish Republic.

=== 1970–1975 ===
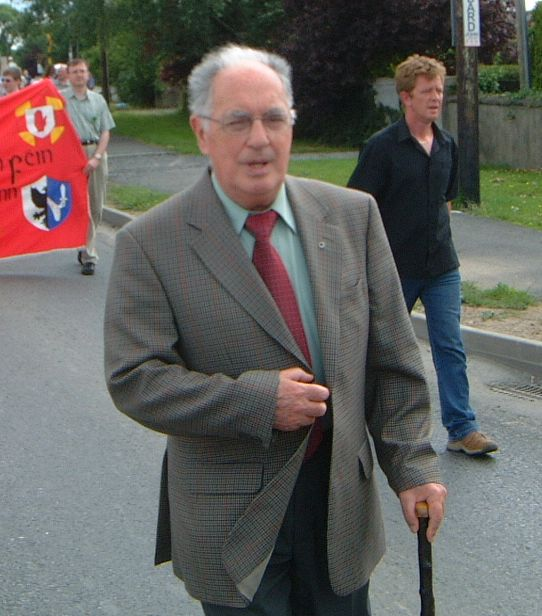
Ruairí Ó Brádaigh (pictured in 2004) was the president of Provisional Sinn Féin from 1970 until 1983.

Sinn Féin split in two at the beginning of 1970. On 11 January, the proposal to end abstentionism and take seats, if elected, in the Dáil, the Parliament of Northern Ireland and the Parliament of the United Kingdom was put before the members at the party's Ard Fheis. A similar motion had been adopted at an IRA convention the previous month, leading to the formation of a Provisional Army Council by Mac Stíofáin and other members opposed to the leadership. When the motion was put to the Ard Fheis, it failed to achieve the necessary two-thirds majority. The Executive attempted to circumvent this by introducing a motion in support of IRA policy, at which point the dissenting delegates walked out of the meeting. These members reconvened at Kevin Barry Hall in Parnell Square, where they appointed a Caretaker Executive with Ruairí Ó Brádaigh as chairman. The Caretaker Executive's first act was to pass a resolution pledging allegiance to the 32-county Irish Republic and the Provisional Army Council. It also declared itself opposed to the ending of abstentionism, the drift towards "extreme forms of socialism", the failure of the leadership to defend the nationalist people of Belfast during the 1969 Northern Ireland riots, and the expulsion of traditional republicans by the leadership during the 1960s.

At its October 1970 Ard Fheis, delegates were informed that an IRA convention had been held and had regularised its structure, bringing to an end the "provisional" period. By then, however, the label "Provisional" or "Provo" was already being applied to them by the media. The opposing, anti-abstentionist party became known as "Official Sinn Féin". It changed its name in 1977 to "Sinn Féin—The Workers' Party", and in 1982 to "The Workers' Party".

Because the "Provisionals" were committed to military rather than political action, Sinn Féin's initial membership was largely confined, in Danny Morrison's words, to men "over military age or women". A Sinn Féin organiser of the time in Belfast described the party's role as "agitation and publicity". New cumainn (branches) were established in Belfast, and a new newspaper, Republican News, was published. Sinn Féin took off as a protest movement after the introduction of internment in August 1971, organising marches and pickets. The party launched its platform, Éire Nua ("a New Ireland") at the 1971 Ard Fheis. In general, however, the party lacked a distinct political philosophy. In the words of Brian Feeney, "Ó Brádaigh would use Sinn Féin ard fheiseanna (party conferences) to announce republican policy, which was, in effect, IRA policy, namely that Britain should leave the North or the 'war' would continue".

In May 1974, a few months after the Sunningdale Agreement, the ban on Sinn Féin was lifted by the UK Secretary of State for Northern Ireland. Sinn Féin was given a concrete presence in the community when the IRA declared a ceasefire in 1975. 'Incident centres', manned by Sinn Féin members, were set up to communicate potential confrontations to the British authorities.

From 1976, there was a broadcasting ban on Sinn Féin representatives in the Republic of Ireland, after the Minister for Posts and Telegraphs, Conor Cruise O'Brien, amended Section 31 of the Broadcasting Act. This prevented RTÉ interviewing Sinn Féin spokespersons under any circumstances, even where the subject was not related to the Northern Ireland conflict. This lasted until 1994.

=== 1976–1983 ===
Political status for prisoners became an issue after the ending of the truce. Rees released the last of the internees, and ended 'Special Category Status' for all prisoners convicted after 1 March 1976. This led first to the blanket protest, and then to the dirty protest. Around the same time, Gerry Adams began writing for Republican News, calling for Sinn Féin to become more involved politically. Over the next few years, Adams and those aligned with him would extend their influence throughout the republican movement and slowly marginalise Ó Brádaigh, part of a general trend of power in both Sinn Féin and the IRA shifting north. In particular, Ó Brádaigh's part in the 1975 IRA ceasefire had damaged his reputation in the eyes of northern republicans.

The prisoners' protest climaxed with the 1981 hunger strike, during which striker Bobby Sands was elected Member of Parliament for Fermanagh and South Tyrone as an Anti H-Block candidate. After his death on hunger strike, his seat was held, with an increased vote, by his election agent, Owen Carron. Two other Anti H-Block candidates were elected to Dáil Éireann in the general election in the Republic. These successes convinced republicans that they should contest every election. Danny Morrison expressed the mood at the 1981 Ard Fheis when he said:

Who here really believes we can win the war through the ballot box? But will anyone here object if, with a ballot paper in this hand and an Armalite in the other, we take power in Ireland?

This was the origin of what became known as the Armalite and ballot box strategy. Ó Brádaigh's chief policy, a plan for a federalised Irish state dubbed Éire Nua, was dropped in 1982, and the following year Ó Brádaigh stepped down as president, and was replaced by Adams.

=== 1983–1998 ===
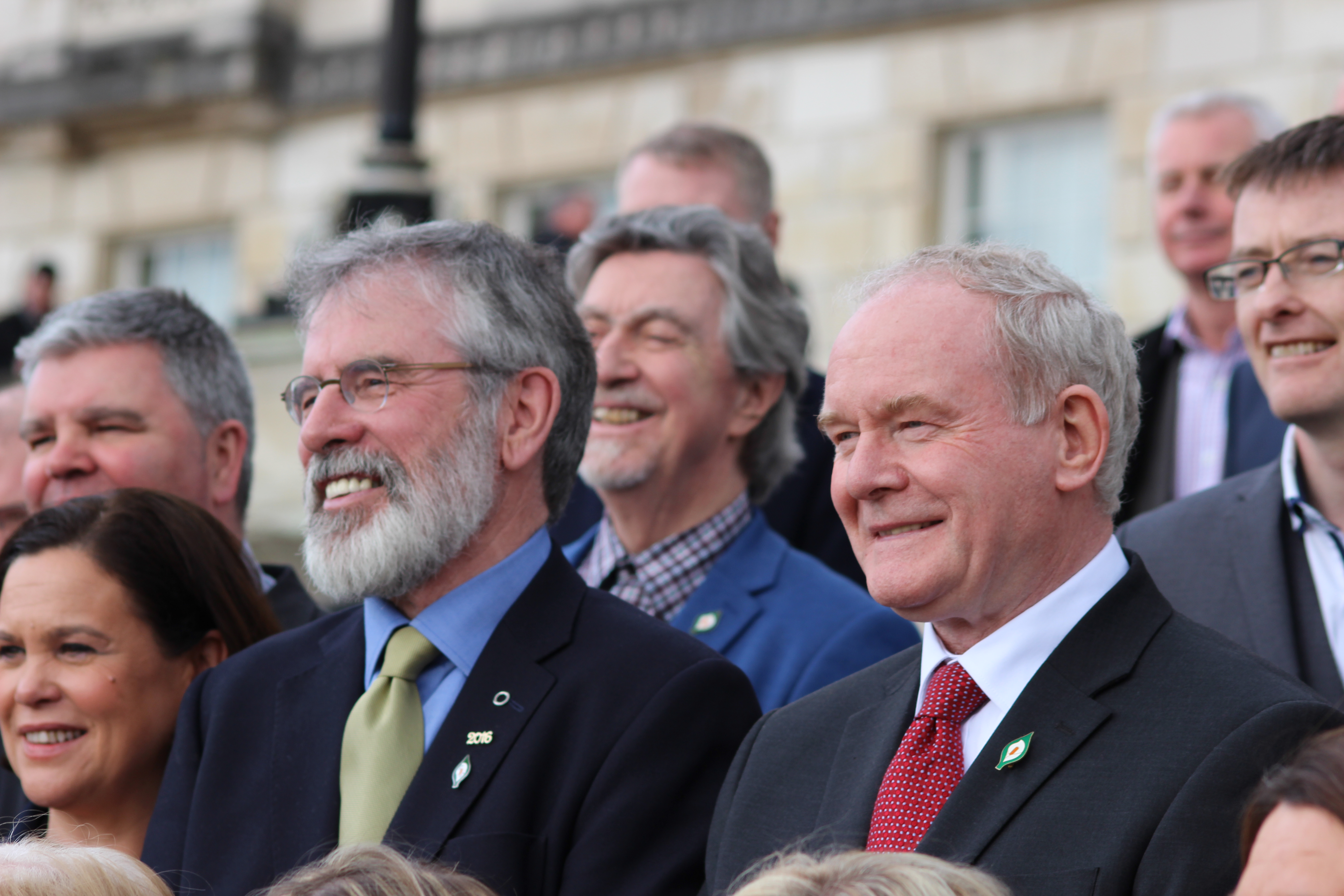
Under the political leadership of Gerry Adams and Martin McGuinness (pictured 2016), Sinn Féin adopted a reformist policy, eventually leading to the Good Friday Agreement.

Under Adams' leadership electoral politics became increasingly important. In 1983 Alex Maskey was elected to Belfast City Council, the first Sinn Féin member to sit on that body. Sinn Féin polled over 100,000 votes in the Westminster elections that year, and Adams won the West Belfast seat that had been held by the Social Democratic and Labour Party (SDLP). By 1985 it had 59 seats on seventeen of the 26 Northern Ireland councils, including seven on Belfast City Council.

The party began a reappraisal of the policy of abstention from the Dáil. At the 1983 Ard Fheis the constitution was amended to remove the ban on the discussion of abstentionism to allow Sinn Féin to run a candidate in the forthcoming European elections. However, in his address, Adams said, "We are an abstentionist party. It is not my intention to advocate change in this situation." A motion to permit entry into the Dáil was allowed at the 1985 Ard Fheis, but did not have the active support of the leadership, and it failed narrowly. By October of the following year an IRA Convention had indicated its support for elected Sinn Féin TDs taking their seats. Thus, when the motion to end abstention was put to the Ard Fheis on 1 November 1986, it was clear that there would not be a split in the IRA as there had been in 1970. The motion was passed with a two-thirds majority. Ó Brádaigh and about twenty other delegates walked out, and met in a Dublin hotel with hundreds of supporters to re-organise as Republican Sinn Féin.

In October 1988, the British Conservative government followed the Republic in banning broadcasts of Sinn Féin representatives. Prime Minister Margaret Thatcher said it would "deny terrorists the oxygen of publicity". Broadcasters quickly found ways around the ban, mainly by using actors to dub the voices of banned speakers. The legislation did not apply during election campaigns and under certain other circumstances. The ban lasted until 1994.

Tentative negotiations between Sinn Féin and the British government led to more substantive discussions with the SDLP in the 1990s. Multi-party negotiations began in 1994 in Northern Ireland, without Sinn Féin. The Provisional IRA declared a ceasefire in August 1994. Sinn Féin then joined the talks, but the Conservative government under John Major soon came to depend on unionist votes to remain in power. It suspended Sinn Féin from the talks, and began to insist that the IRA decommission all of their weapons before Sinn Féin be re-admitted to the talks; this led to the IRA calling off its ceasefire. The new Labour government of Tony Blair was not reliant on unionist votes and re-admitted Sinn Féin, leading to another, permanent, ceasefire.

The talks led to the Good Friday Agreement of 10 April 1998, which set up an inclusive devolved government in Northern Ireland, and altered the Dublin government's constitutional claim to the whole island in Articles 2 and 3 of the Constitution of Ireland. Republicans opposed to the direction taken by Sinn Féin in the peace process formed the 32 County Sovereignty Movement in the late 1990s.

=== 1998–2017 ===
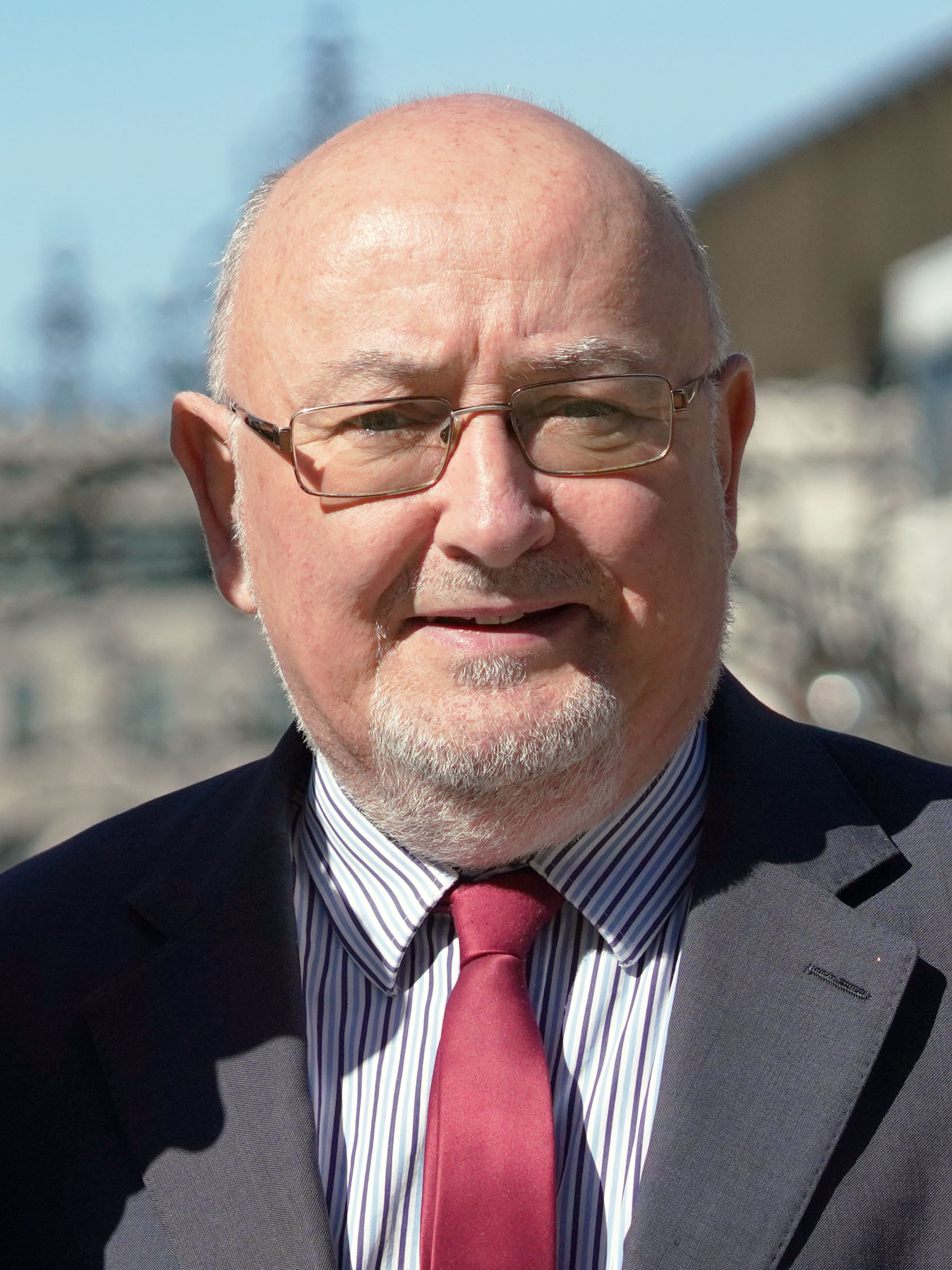
The election of Caoimhghín Ó Caoláin to the Dáil in 1997 was the first time in 75 years a Sinn Féin TD had taken their seat and marked a turning point in the party's history

At the 1997 Irish general election, Caoimhghín Ó Caoláin was elected to the Dáil. In doing so, he became the first person under the "Sinn Féin" banner to be elected to Leinster House since 1957, and the first since 1922 to take their seat. Ó Caoláin's entry to the Dáil marked the beginning of a continuous Sinn Féin presence in the Republic of Ireland's national political bodies.

The party expelled Denis Donaldson, a party official, in December 2005, with him stating publicly that he had been in the employ of the British government as an agent since the 1980s. Donaldson told reporters that the British security agencies who employed him were behind the collapse of the Assembly and set up Sinn Féin to take the blame for it, a claim disputed by the British government. Donaldson was found fatally shot in his home in County Donegal on 4 April 2006, and a murder inquiry was launched. In April 2009, the Real IRA released a statement taking responsibility for the killing.

When Sinn Féin and the Democratic Unionist Party (DUP) became the largest parties, by the terms of the Good Friday Agreement no deal could be made without the support of both parties. They nearly reached a deal in November 2004, but the DUP insisted on photographic or video evidence that decommissioning of IRA weapons had been carried out, which was unacceptable to Sinn Féin.

In April 2006, a number of members of Sinn Féin who believed the party was not committed enough to socialism split from the party and formed a new group called Éirígí, which later became a (minor) political party in its own right.

On 2 September 2006, Martin McGuinness publicly stated that Sinn Féin would refuse to participate in a shadow assembly at Stormont, asserting that his party would only take part in negotiations that were aimed at restoring a power-sharing government. This development followed a decision on the part of members of Sinn Féin to refrain from participating in debates since the Assembly's recall the previous May. The relevant parties to these talks were given a deadline of 24 November 2006 to decide upon whether or not they would ultimately form the executive.

The 86-year Sinn Féin boycott of policing in Northern Ireland ended on 28 January 2007, when the Ard Fheis voted overwhelmingly to support the Police Service of Northern Ireland (PSNI). Sinn Féin members began to sit on Policing Boards and join District Policing Partnerships. There was opposition to this decision within Sinn Féin, and some members left, including elected representatives. The most well-known opponent was former IRA prisoner Gerry McGeough, who stood in the 2007 Assembly election against Sinn Féin in the constituency of Fermanagh and South Tyrone, as an Independent Republican. He polled 1.8% of the vote. Others who opposed this development left to found the Republican Network for Unity.

Sinn Féin supported a no vote in the referendum on the Twenty-eighth Amendment of the Constitution Bill 2008.

Immediately after the June 2017 UK general election, where the Conservatives won 49% of seats but not an overall majority, so that non-mainstream parties could have significant influence, Gerry Adams announced for Sinn Féin that their elected MPs would continue the policy of not swearing allegiance to the Queen, as would be required for them to take their seats in the Westminster Parliament.

In 2017 and 2018, there were allegations of bullying within the party, leading to a number of resignations and expulsions of elected members.

At the Ard Fheis on 18 November 2017, Gerry Adams announced he would stand down as president of Sinn Féin in 2018, and would not stand for re-election as TD for Louth.

=== 2018–present ===
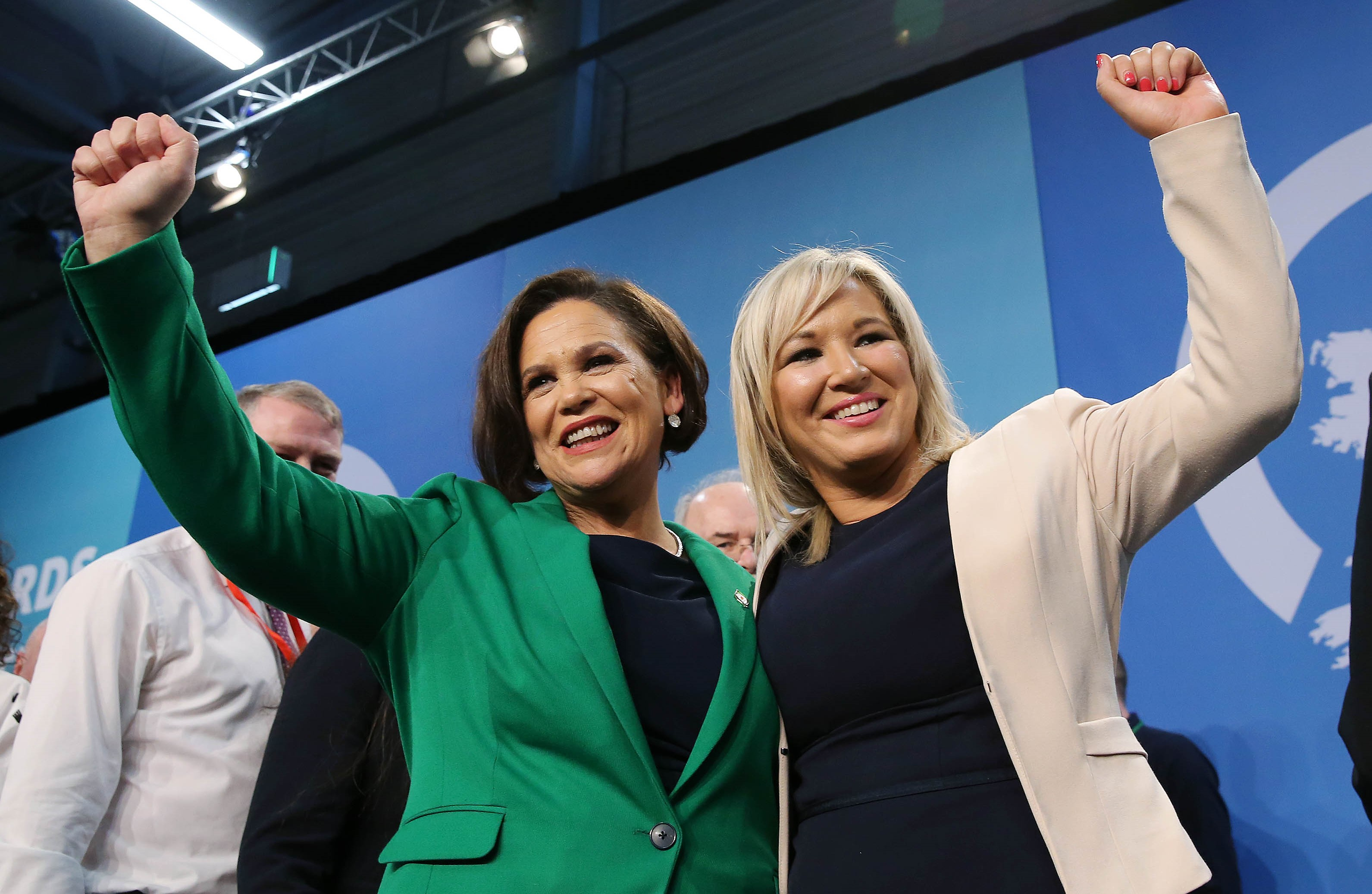
Mary Lou McDonald and Michelle O'Neill in February 2018

On 10 February 2018, Mary Lou McDonald was announced as the new president of Sinn Féin at a special Ard Fheis in Dublin. Michelle O'Neill was also elected as vice president of the party.

Sinn Féin were opposed to Northern Ireland leaving the European Union together with the rest of the United Kingdom, with Martin McGuinness suggesting a referendum on the reunification of Ireland immediately after the 2016 United Kingdom European Union membership referendum results were announced, a stance later reiterated by McDonald as a way of resolving the border issues raised by Brexit.

Sinn Féin's first elections under McDonald resulted in the party performing well under its own expectations during the 2018 Irish presidential election that October, and similarly, the party's performance was labelled "disastrous" during the concurrent May 2019 European Parliament election in Ireland and 2019 Irish local elections. In the European elections, Sinn Féin lost 2 MEPs and dropped their vote share by 7.8%, while in the local elections the party lost 78 (almost half) of their local councillors and dropped their vote share by 5.7%. McDonald stated "It was a really bad day out for us. But sometimes that happens in politics, and it's a test for you. I mean it's a test for me personally, obviously, as the leader".

However, in the 2020 Irish general election, Sinn Féin received the greatest number of first preference votes nationally, making it the best result for any incarnation of Sinn Féin since the 1922 election. Fianna Fáil, Fine Gael and the Green Party formed a coalition government in June 2020. Although second on seats won at the election, Sinn Féin became the largest party in the Dáil when Marc MacSharry resigned from Fianna Fáil in September 2021, which, with Seán Ó Fearghaíl sitting as Ceann Comhairle, left Sinn Féin the largest party by one seat. Sinn Féin lost their numerical advantage in February 2022 following the resignation of Violet-Anne Wynne.

In November 2020, the national chairman of Sinn Féin Declan Kearney contacted several dissident republican political parties such as Saoradh, Republican Network for Unity and the Irish Republican Socialist Party about creating a united republican campaign to call for a referendum on Irish unification. This information did not become publicly known until 2022 and the move was criticised in some quarters on the basis that it would be wrong for Sinn Féin to work with dissident republican groups which do not repudiate violence by paramilitaries. Sinn Féin retorted that engaging with dissident republicans draws them into the democratic process and political solutions instead of violent ones.

Sinn Féin won 29% of the first-preference votes in the 2022 Northern Ireland Assembly election, the highest share of any party. With 27 out of 90 seats, they became the largest party in Stormont for the first time ever. "Today ushers in a new era", O'Neill said shortly before the final results were announced. "Irrespective of religious, political or social backgrounds, my commitment is to make politics work."

Following the 2023 Northern Ireland local elections, Sinn Féin became the largest party in local government for the first time. Then, in the local elections in the Republic of Ireland in 2024, Sinn Féin increased their vote share, however, significantly fell short of the polls, showcasing a divide between the party's leadership and grassroots over immigration, with disgruntled Sinn Féin voters voting instead for small right-wing parties. However, following the 2024 United Kingdom general election, Sinn Féin became the single largest party representing Northern Ireland in Westminster.

== Past links with Republican paramilitaries ==
Sinn Féin is the largest Irish republican political party, and was historically associated with the Irish Republican Army, while also having been associated with the Provisional Irish Republican Army in the party's modern incarnation. The Irish government alleged that senior members of Sinn Féin have held posts on the IRA Army Council. However, the SF leadership has denied these claims.

A republican document of the early 1980s stated: "Both Sinn Féin and the IRA play different but converging roles in the war of national liberation. The Irish Republican Army wages an armed campaign... Sinn Féin maintains the propaganda war and is the public and political voice of the movement". Robert White states at that time Sinn Féin was the junior partner in the relationship with the IRA, and they were separate organisations despite there being some overlapping membership.

Because of the party's links to the Provisional IRA, the U.S. Department of State barred its members along with IRA volunteers from entering the U.S. since the early 1970s in accordance with the Immigration and Nationality Act on the grounds that they were associated with the IRA waging war against a legitimate government.

The British government stated in 2005 that "we had always said all the way through we believed that Sinn Féin and the IRA were inextricably linked and that had obvious implications at leadership level".

The Northern Bank robbery of £26.5 million in Belfast in December 2004 further delayed a political deal in Northern Ireland. The IRA were widely blamed for the robbery, although Sinn Féin denied this and stated that party officials had not known of the robbery nor sanctioned it. Because of the timing of the robbery, it is considered that the plans for the robbery must have been laid whilst Sinn Féin was engaged in talks about a possible peace settlement. This undermined confidence among unionists about the sincerity of republicans towards reaching agreement. In the aftermath of the row over the robbery, a further controversy erupted when, on RTÉ's Questions and Answers programme, the chairman of Sinn Féin, Mitchel McLaughlin, insisted that the IRA's controversial killing of a mother of ten young children, Jean McConville, in the early 1970s though "wrong", was not a crime, as it had taken place in the context of the political conflict. Politicians from the Republic, along with the Irish media, strongly attacked McLaughlin's comments.

On 10 February 2005, the government-appointed Independent Monitoring Commission reported that it firmly supported the PSNI and Garda Síochána assessments that the IRA was responsible for the Northern Bank robbery and that certain senior members of Sinn Féin were also senior members of the IRA and would have had knowledge of and given approval to the carrying out of the robbery. Sinn Féin has argued that the IMC is not independent, and that the inclusion of former Alliance Party leader John Alderdice and a British security head was proof of this. The IMC recommended further financial sanctions against Sinn Féin members of the Northern Ireland Assembly. The British government responded by saying it would ask MPs to vote to withdraw the parliamentary allowances of the four Sinn Féin MPs elected in 2001.

Gerry Adams responded to the IMC report by challenging the Irish government to have him arrested for IRA membership—a crime in both jurisdictions—and for conspiracy.

On 20 February 2005, the Irish Minister for Justice, Equality and Law Reform Michael McDowell publicly accused three of the Sinn Féin leadership, Gerry Adams, Martin McGuinness and Martin Ferris (TD for Kerry North) of being on the seven-man IRA Army Council; they later denied this.

On 27 February 2005, a demonstration against the murder of Robert McCartney on 30 January 2005 was held in east Belfast. Alex Maskey, a former Sinn Féin Lord Mayor of Belfast, was told by relatives of McCartney to "hand over the 12" IRA members involved. The McCartney family, although formerly Sinn Féin voters themselves, urged witnesses to the crime to contact the PSNI. Three IRA men were expelled from the organisation, and a man was charged with McCartney's murder.

Irish Taoiseach Bertie Ahern subsequently called Sinn Féin and the IRA "both sides of the same coin". In February 2005, Dáil Éireann passed a motion condemning the party's alleged involvement in illegal activity. The Bush Administration did not invite Sinn Féin or any other Northern Irish political party to the annual St Patrick's Day celebrations at the White House, choosing instead to invite the family of Robert McCartney. Senator Ted Kennedy, a regular sponsor of Gerry Adams' visits to the US during the peace process, also refused to meet Adams and hosted the McCartney family instead.

On 10 March 2005, the House of Commons in London passed without significant opposition a motion, introduced by the British government, to withdraw the allowances of the four Sinn Féin MPs for one year, in response to the Northern Bank Robbery. This measure cost the party approximately £400,000. However, the debate prior to the vote mainly surrounded the more recent events connected with the murder of Robert McCartney. Conservatives and unionists put down amendments to have the Sinn Féin MPs evicted from their offices at the House of Commons but these were defeated.

In March 2005, Mitchell Reiss, the United States Special Envoy for Northern Ireland, condemned the party's links to the IRA, saying "it is hard to understand how a European country in the year 2005 can have a private army associated with a political party".

The October 2015 Assessment on Paramilitary Groups in Northern Ireland concluded that the Provisional IRA still existed "in a much reduced form", and that some IRA members believed its Army Council oversaw both the IRA and Sinn Féin, although it believed that the leadership "remains committed to the peace process and its aim of achieving a united Ireland by political means".

== Organisation and structure ==
Members of Sinn Féin's National Officer Board

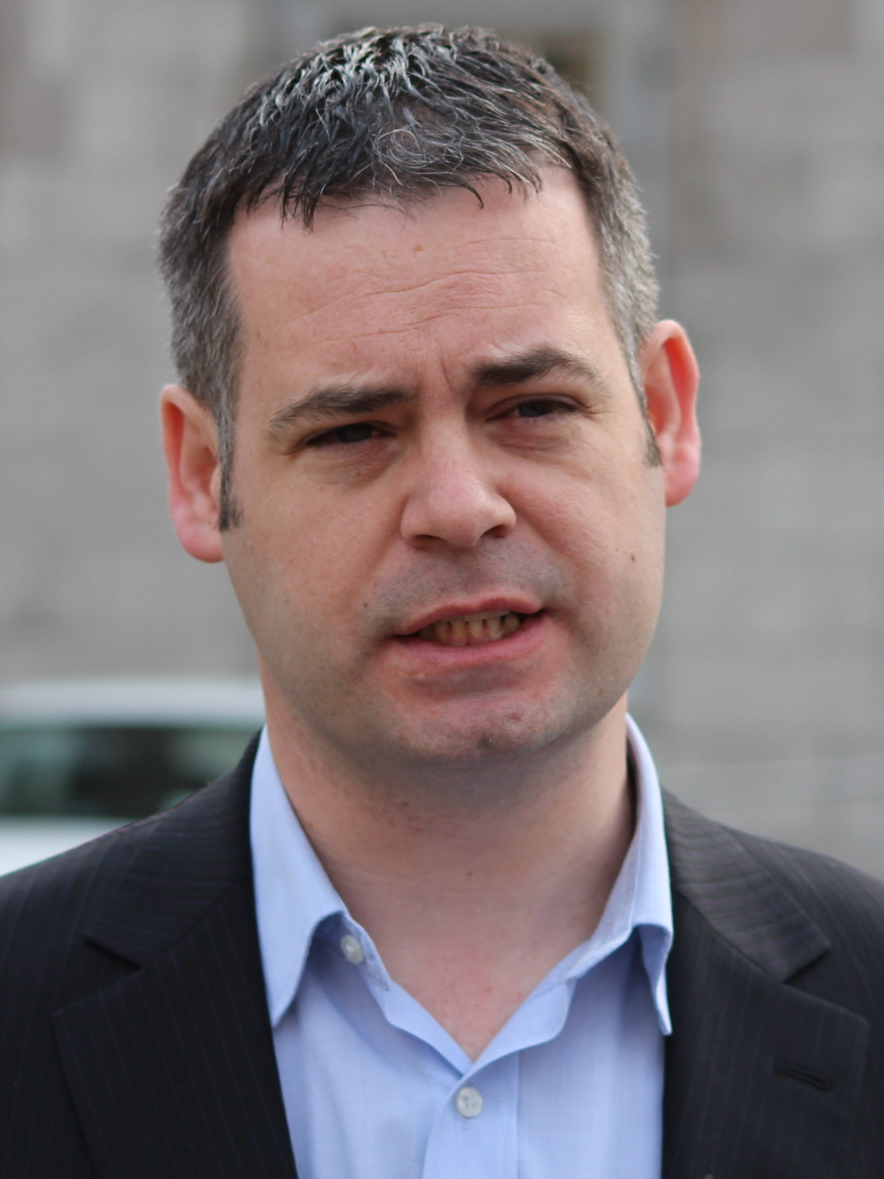
Treasurer: Pearse Doherty

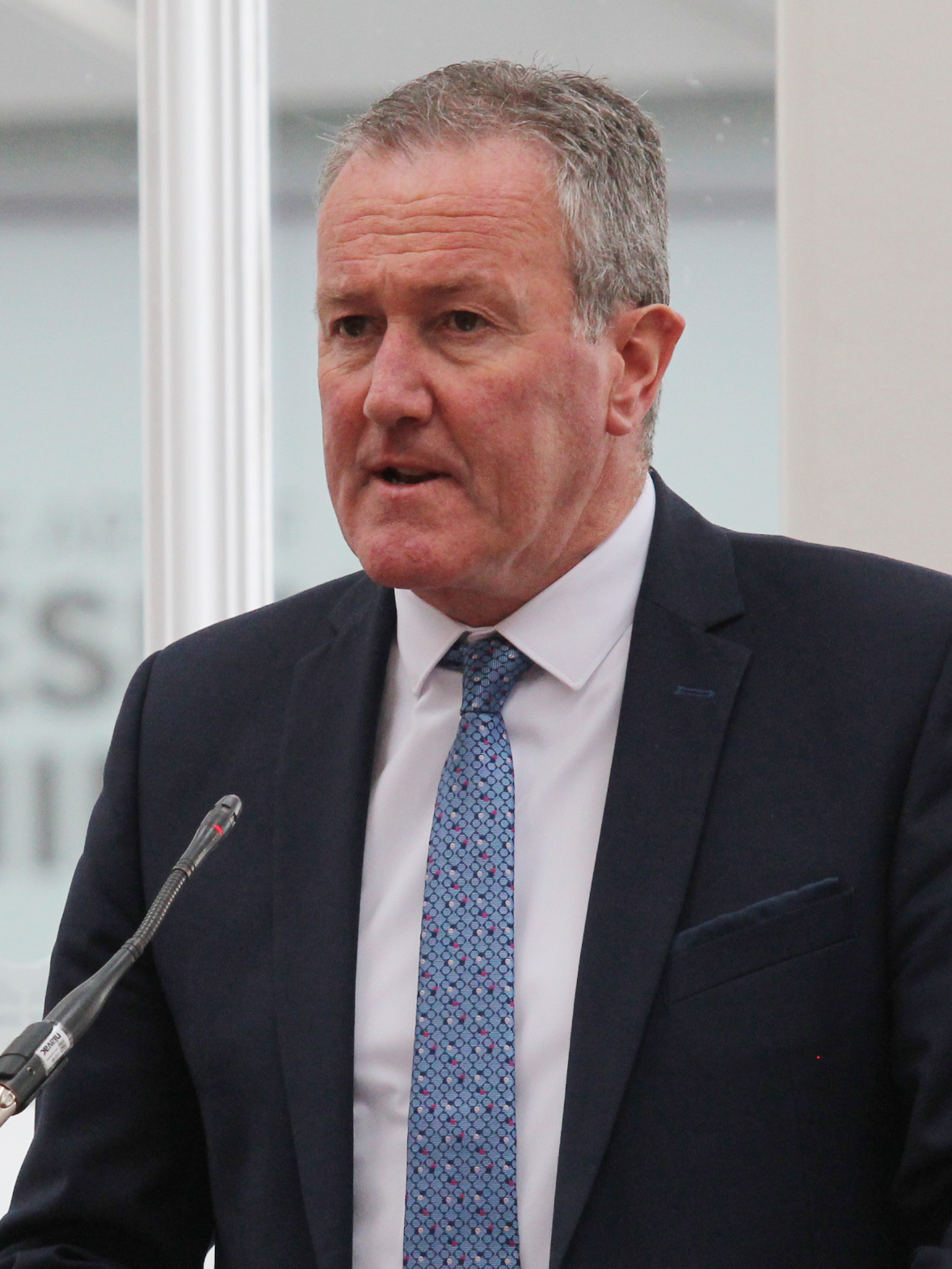
Treasurer: Conor Murphy

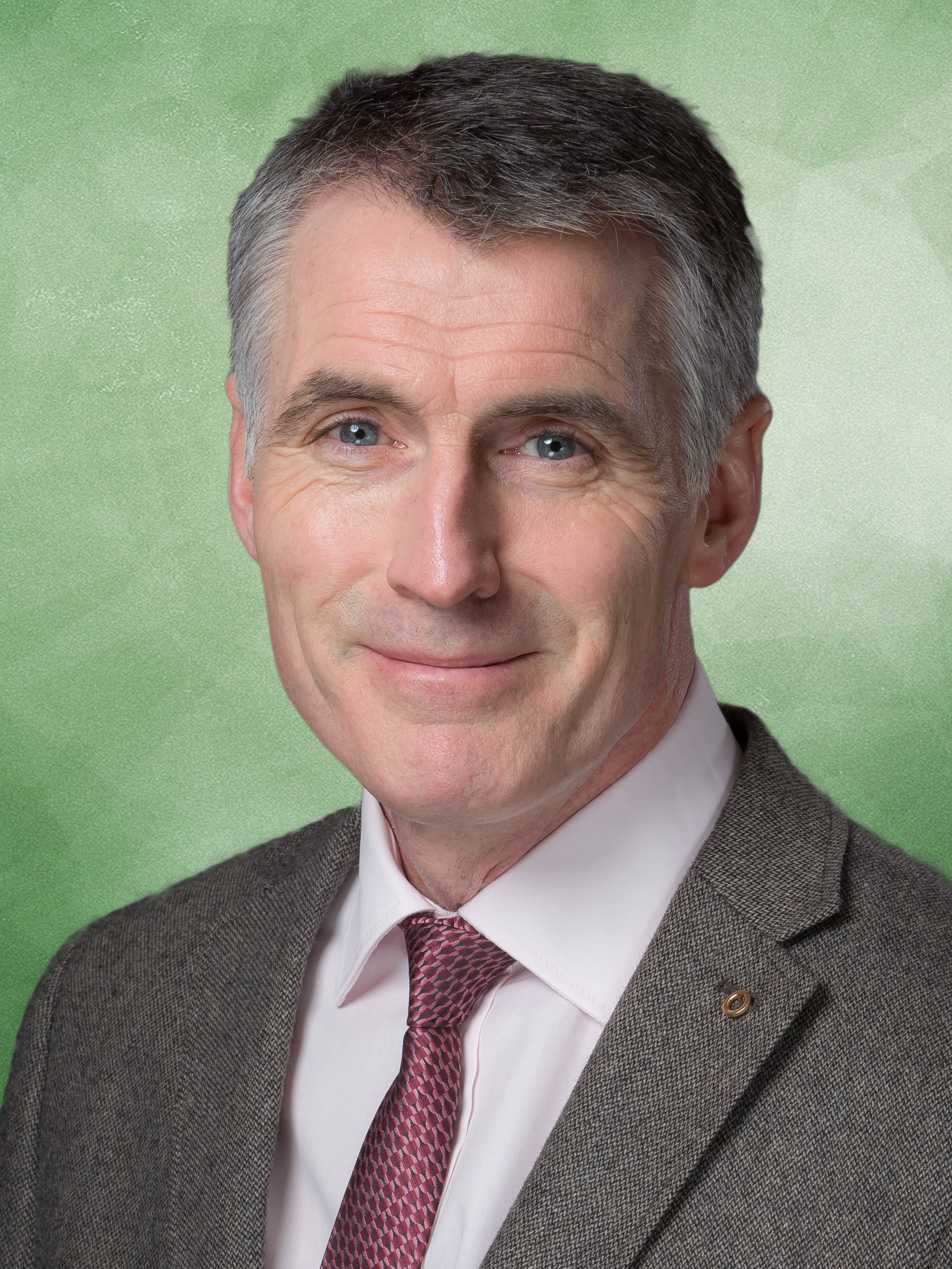
Chairperson: Declan Kearney

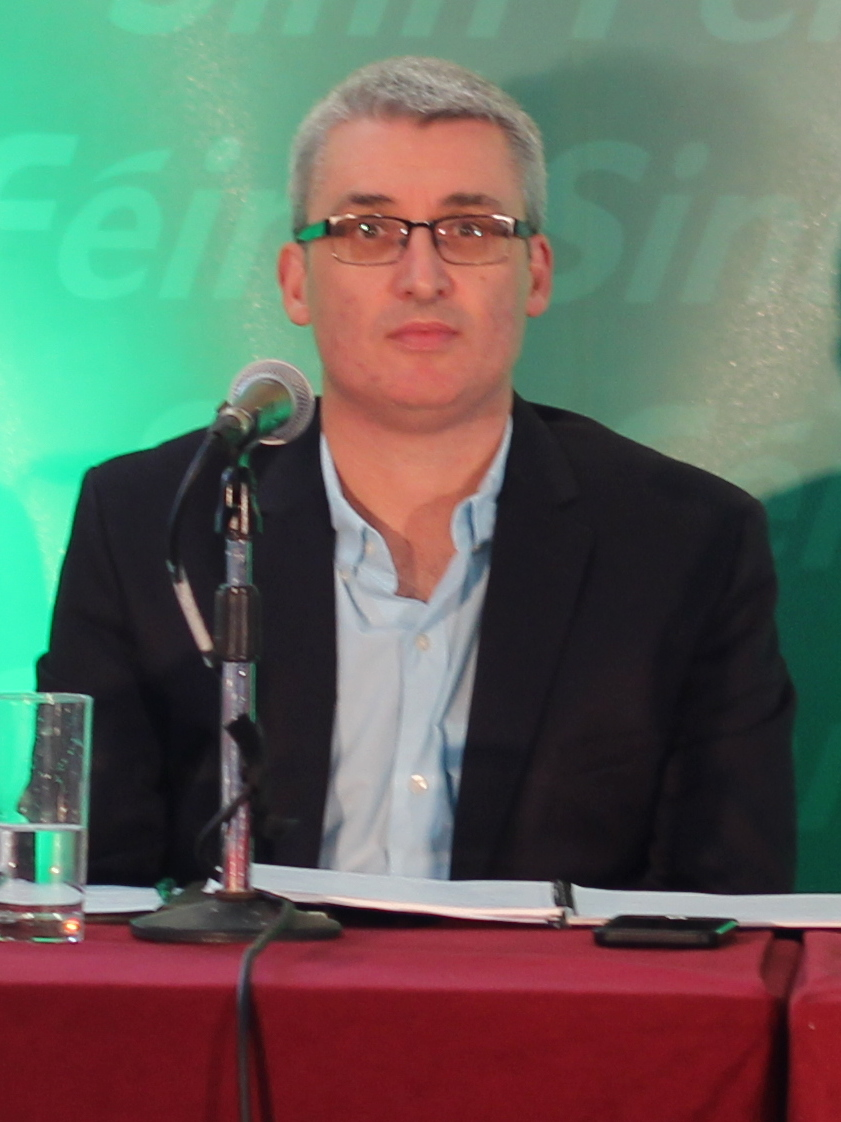
Director of Publicity: Ciarán Quinn

General Secretary: Sam Baker

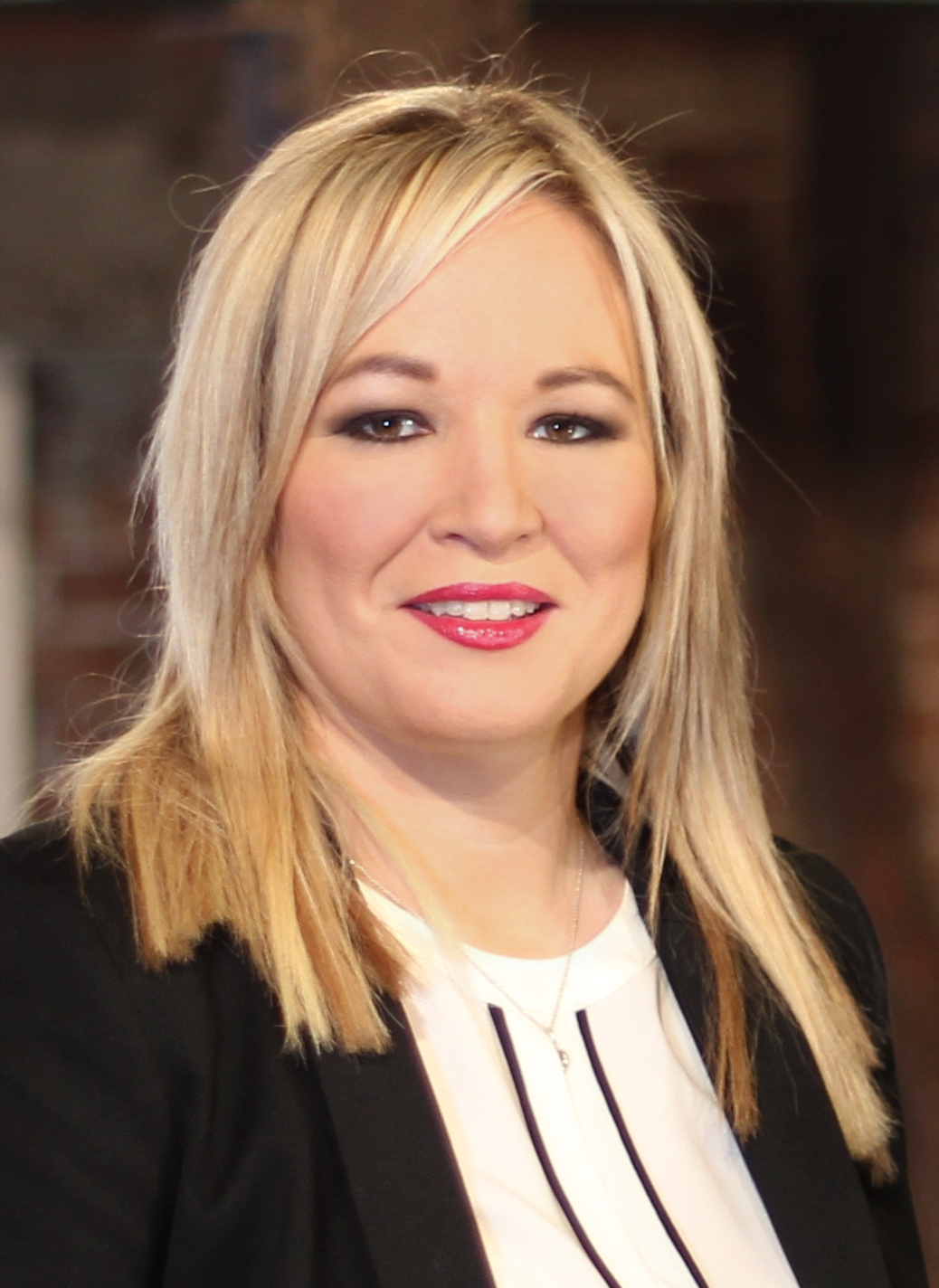
Vice-President: Michelle O'Neill

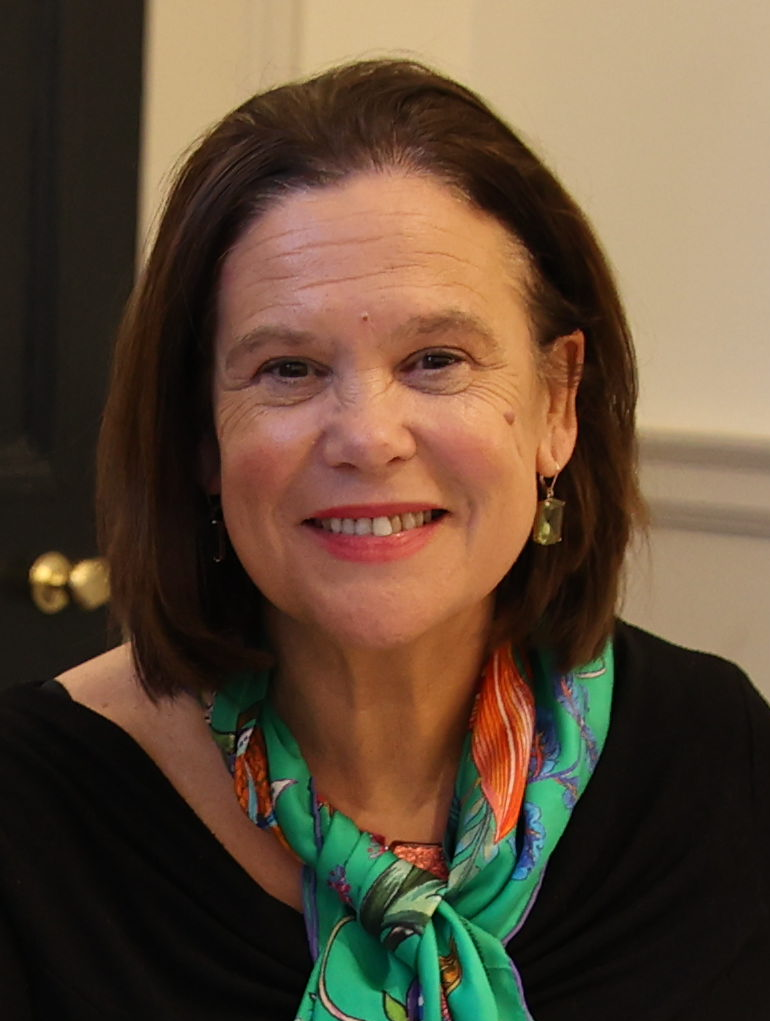
President: Mary Lou McDonald

Sinn Féin operates under the principle of democratic centralism; the concept that policy should be debated internally within the party, and once a decision is made, all members must support the chosen policy publicly or be disciplined. Once a decision has been made, it cannot be revisited or altered for a prolonged period of time.

Decision-making within Sinn Féin is controlled by two bodies; the national officer board and the Árd Comhairle (national executive). The national officer board consists of 7 members, made up of the President of Sinn Féin, the Vice President, the chairperson, the General Secretary, the Director of Publicity and two treasurers. Policy will be debated amongst the national officer board before next being brought before the Árd Comhairle.

Sinn Féin's Árd Comhairle consists of 47 members. Members of the national officer board are automatically members, while the rest of the membership is made up of officers elected at Sinn Féin's annual national conference (Ard Fheis). Members of the Árd Comhairle must already be members of the Comhairlí Limistéir (Area councils), which are based on county or constituency boundaries. As of 2023, despite the fact that the bulk majority of Sinn Féin's membership and elected representatives come from the Republic of Ireland, the majority of the Árd Comhairle is from Northern Ireland. For every 2 TDs on the Árd Comhairle, there are 3 MLAs. Some members of the Árd Comhairle hold no public office and are former members of the Provisional IRA.

When a decision is made by the Árd Comhairle, all members of Sinn Féin must abide by it without dissent, including the President. In 2020, all of Sinn Féin's candidates in the 2020 Irish general election were required to sign a pledge stating "in all matters pertaining to the duties and functions of an elected representative, I will be guided by and hold myself amenable to all directions and instructions issued to me by An Ard Chomhairle of Sinn Féin".

Within the Árd Comhairle, there is a further subdivision, called the Coiste Seasta (Standing Committee), made up of 8 members, who act as a Central Committee. Unlike other Teachtaí Dála from other parties, Sinn Féin TDs are not allowed to hire their own staff and instead the Coiste Seasta chooses staff for them. Some Sinn Féin TDs have complained of these staff members handing them scripts to read publicly which they had no input into writing.

Some critics inside Sinn Féin have opined that decision-making in the party rests with the officer board and that the Árd Comhairle serves merely to rubber stamp decisions that have already been made. External critics have called Sinn Féin's organisation and structure "opaque", "hierarchical", "confusing" and "undemocratic". Former Sinn Féin TD Peadar Tóibín claimed in 2020 that Sinn Féin TDs have "zero influence" over party policy, and that all decisions ultimately rested with the national officer board. It was also in 2020 that both Fine Gael and Fianna Fáil criticised Sinn Féin's organisation, with Patrick O'Donovan of Fine Gael stating "the fact that Sinn Féin reps sign a pledge which says they will be guided by their Ard Chomhairle, a council of people not elected by the public, rather than those who elect them, is an outright affront to democracy". In 2022 the left-wing political magazine Village opined that while all major political parties in Ireland are influenced by unelected individuals, Sinn Féin is disproportionally controlled by a "backroom regime", and alleged that the Coiste Seasta, made up of unelected Northerners and former IRA members, holds the power to influence the decisions of TDs.

Sinn Féin denies the allegations that its structure is undemocratic and has compared its organisation to other Irish political parties such as Fianna Fáil. Sinn Féin maintains it is a bottom-up, not a top-down organisation and that, ultimately, decision-making comes from its annual Ard Fhéis and the votes of ordinary members. In 2020 Mary Lou McDonald dismissed suggestions that Sinn Féin, including herself, were controlled by "shadowy figures" as an idea rooted in sexism. In 2020 she stated "I have a strong sense that there is at least an undertone of sexism and misogyny in suggesting that our strings are pulled. I'm very stubborn. I'm very willful. I know my own mind and God help anybody who tries to pull my strings or tell me what to do", while in 2021 she stated that people needed to get over the "sexist" idea that "this woman couldn't possibly be really the leader of Sinn Féin. Well guess what? I really am, boys".

== Ideology and policies ==
Sinn Féin is an Irish republican, democratic socialist and left-wing party. In the European Parliament, the party aligns itself with The Left in the European Parliament – GUE/NGL parliamentary group. Categorised as "populist socialist" in literature, in 2014 leading party strategist and ideologue Eoin Ó Broin described Sinn Féin's entire political project as unashamedly populist. The party has been classed as left-wing nationalist and left-wing populist in academia, noting that while Sinn Féin engages in the "us vs them" dynamic of populism, it does so by engaging in the language of "the people vs elites" without resorting to using anti-immigrant rhetoric.

=== Social and cultural ===
Sinn Féin's main political goal is a united Ireland. Other key policies from their most recent election manifesto are listed below:

- The 18 Northern Ireland MPs who sit or have sat in the Parliament of the United Kingdom to be allowed to sit in Dáil Éireann as full Deputies as well
- Ending academic selection within the education system
- A draft Irish Language Bill for Northern Ireland (Acht na Gaeilge), a Bill that would give the Irish language the same status that the Welsh language has in Wales
- The "plastic bag levy" to be extended to Northern Ireland
- To further Irish-language teaching in Northern Ireland
- Same-sex marriage to be extended to Northern Ireland (It was subsequently legalised via an Act of the UK Parliament in 2019.)
- Passing a ban on conversion therapy.
- A pay cap for Sinn Féin TDs tied to the "average industrial wage".

Sinn Féin believes in immigration, both to fill up vacancies in employment, if the system can properly integrate new immigrants and has the resources to do so, and also to "protect people fleeing persecution and war", but not in "open borders". The party also believes in faster application processing times for refugees, and in abolishing the direct provision system.

=== Economy ===
At the 2020 election in the Republic of Ireland, Sinn Féin committed to:

- 100,000 social and affordable homes over 5 years, along with a ban on rent increases for three years and a tax credit worth up to one month's rent
- Tapering out tax credits for workers earning over €120,000
- Investing €75 million into creating a Worker Co-operative development fund
- Abolishing Universal Social Charge (USC) for workers earning less than €30,000
- Establishing a state-owned childcare service
- Establishment of a government fund to aid small and medium enterprises
- An "all-Ireland" economy with a common currency and one tax
- Abolishing Property Tax

As of January 2022, Sinn Féin in Northern Ireland have committed to:

- 100,000 social and affordable homes over 15 years, plus passing a new Private Tenancies Bill.
- Abolishing VAT on fuel and energy-related goods
- Freezing domestic and commercial rates (outlined by Finance Minister Conor Murphy in the Northern Irish government's 2022/25 budget)
- Capping costs of school uniforms and providing Free School Meal payments outside of term time
- £55 million to assist households with rises in energy bills
- Standardising the minimum wage across all age groups, and introducing a living wage
- Banning zero-hour contracts
- Introducing a "right to disconnect" from work
- One month's free childcare for unemployed/low income parents through the Advisory Discretionary Fund

=== Health ===
At the 2020 election in the Republic of Ireland, Sinn Féin committed to:

- An "All-Ireland-Health-Service" akin to the National Health Service of the United Kingdom
- Cap on consultants' pay
- Abolishment of prescription charges for medical card patients
- Expansion of primary care centres
- Gradual removal of subsidies of private practice in public hospitals and the introduction of a charge for practitioners for the use of public equipment and staff in their private practice
- Free breast screening (to check for breast cancer) of all women over forty

==== Abortion ====
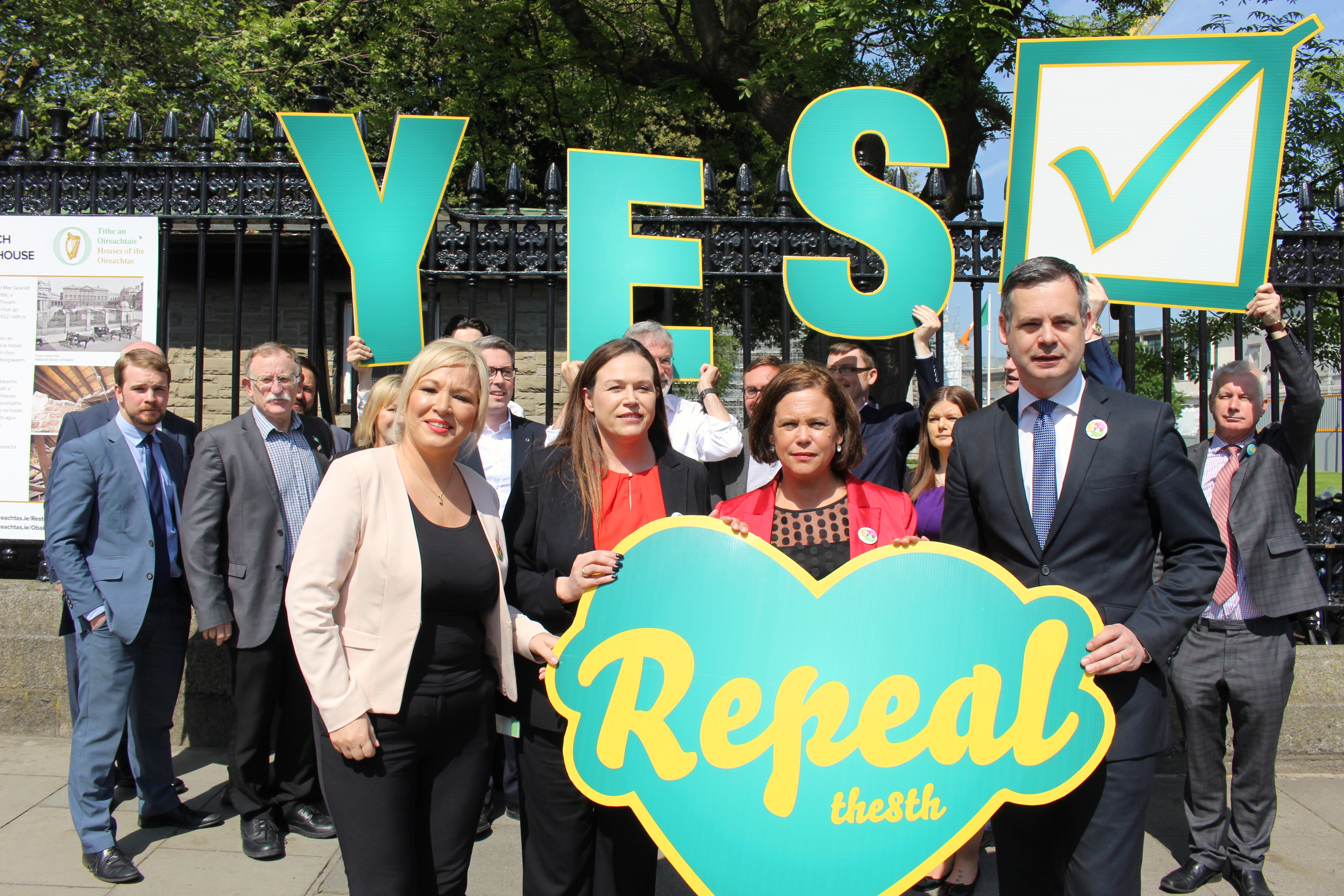
Members of Sinn Féin calling for a Yes vote in the 2018 referendum on abortion in Ireland

Until at least 2007, the party was not in favour of the extension of legalised abortion (British 1967 Act) to Northern Ireland; Assembly member John O'Dowd said that they were "opposed to the attitudes and forces in society, which pressurise women to have abortions, and criminalise those who make this decision", adding that "in cases of rape, incest or sexual abuse, or where a woman's life and health is at risk or in grave danger, we accept that the final decision must rest with the woman." It voted for the Protection of Life During Pregnancy Act 2013, which allowed for termination in cases where a pregnancy endangered a woman's life. It voted to support termination, in those limited circumstances, at the 2015 Ard Fheis, but stopped short of supporting abortion on demand. In the 2018 Irish abortion referendum, the party campaigned for a "Yes" vote, while remaining opposed to abortion without restriction up to 12 weeks. At its Ard Fheis in June 2018, the month after the "yes" vote in the abortion referendum, the party committed itself to supporting abortion, including without restriction up to 12 weeks. This allowed it not only to support abortion legislation in the Republic, but also to campaign for provision of abortion in Northern Ireland. Sinn Féin TD Peadar Tóibín, who was suspended from the party for voting against abortion legislation, left to form a new party: Aontú.

Sinn Féin have been accused of hypocrisy over their positions on abortion in Northern Ireland. In 2021, Sinn Féin abstained on a Stormont vote on restricting abortion access in the case of fetal abnormalities or disabilities, attracting criticism from both anti-abortion and pro-choice groups, with the Abortion Rights Campaign saying they "let down abortion seekers" and Eamonn McCann accusing them of being "impaled on the fence on the issue", but with anti-abortion politicians such as Peadar Tóibín accusing them of "speaking out of both sides of their mouth" on the issue. Later in the year, Amnesty International made a public statement calling on the party to "support full abortion rights across the island of Ireland".

==== Transgender health care ====
Historically the party has supported access to gender affirming healthcare for transgender individuals. However, in 2024 after the UK's Conservative Party enacted a ban on puberty blockers following the Cass Review, Sinn Féin allowed the ban to be extended to Northern Ireland, closing what some considered a "loophole" regarding access to such treatments in the UK. In 2026, Sinn Féin supported a People Before Profit–Solidarity bill which would have introduced formal recognition of non-binary and intersex people in the Republic of Ireland, aimed at improving access to healthcare for these people. The bill however failed to pass.

=== International relations ===
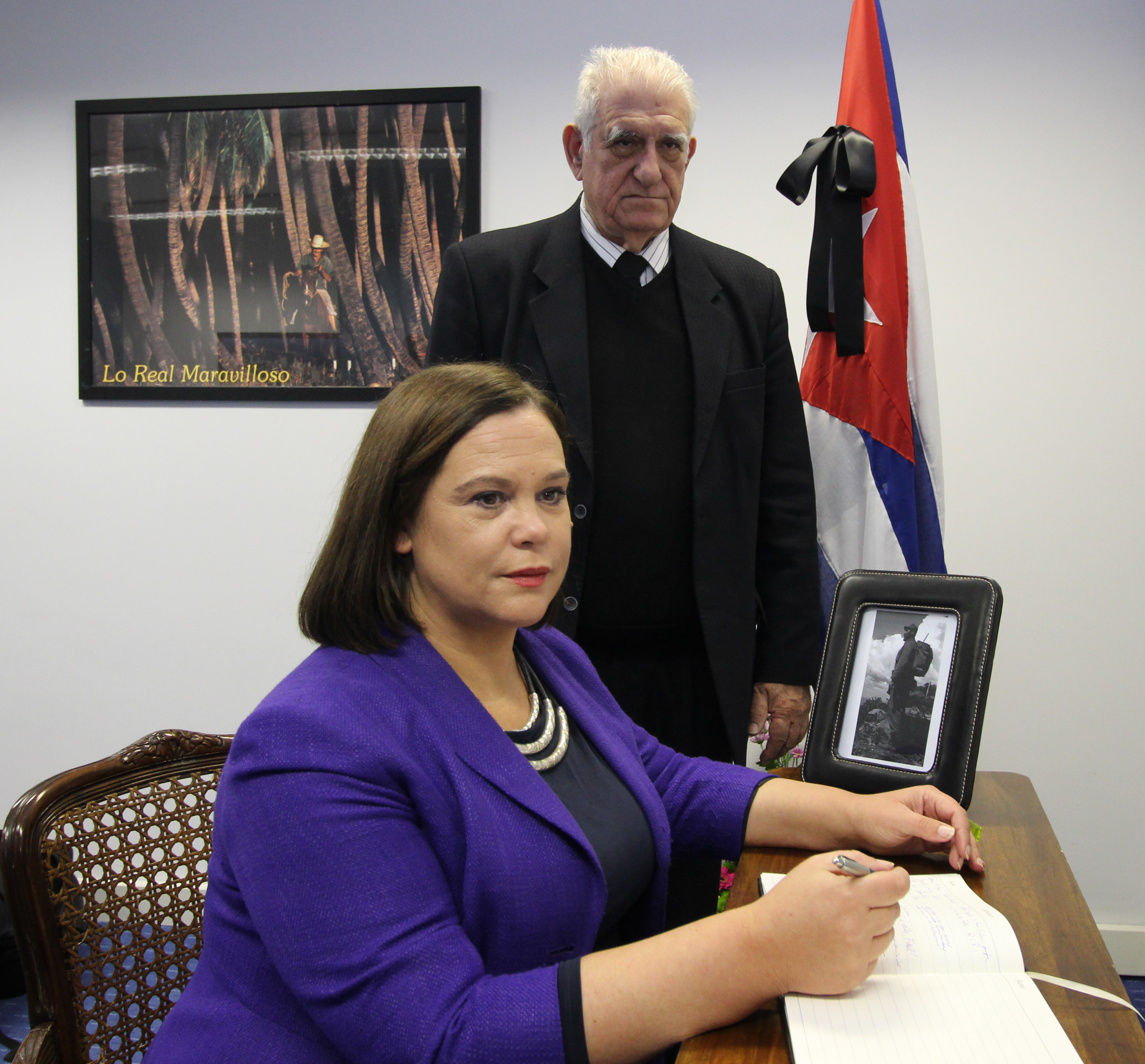
Mary Lou McDonald signing a book of condolences for Fidel Castro at the Cuban Embassy in Dublin in 2016

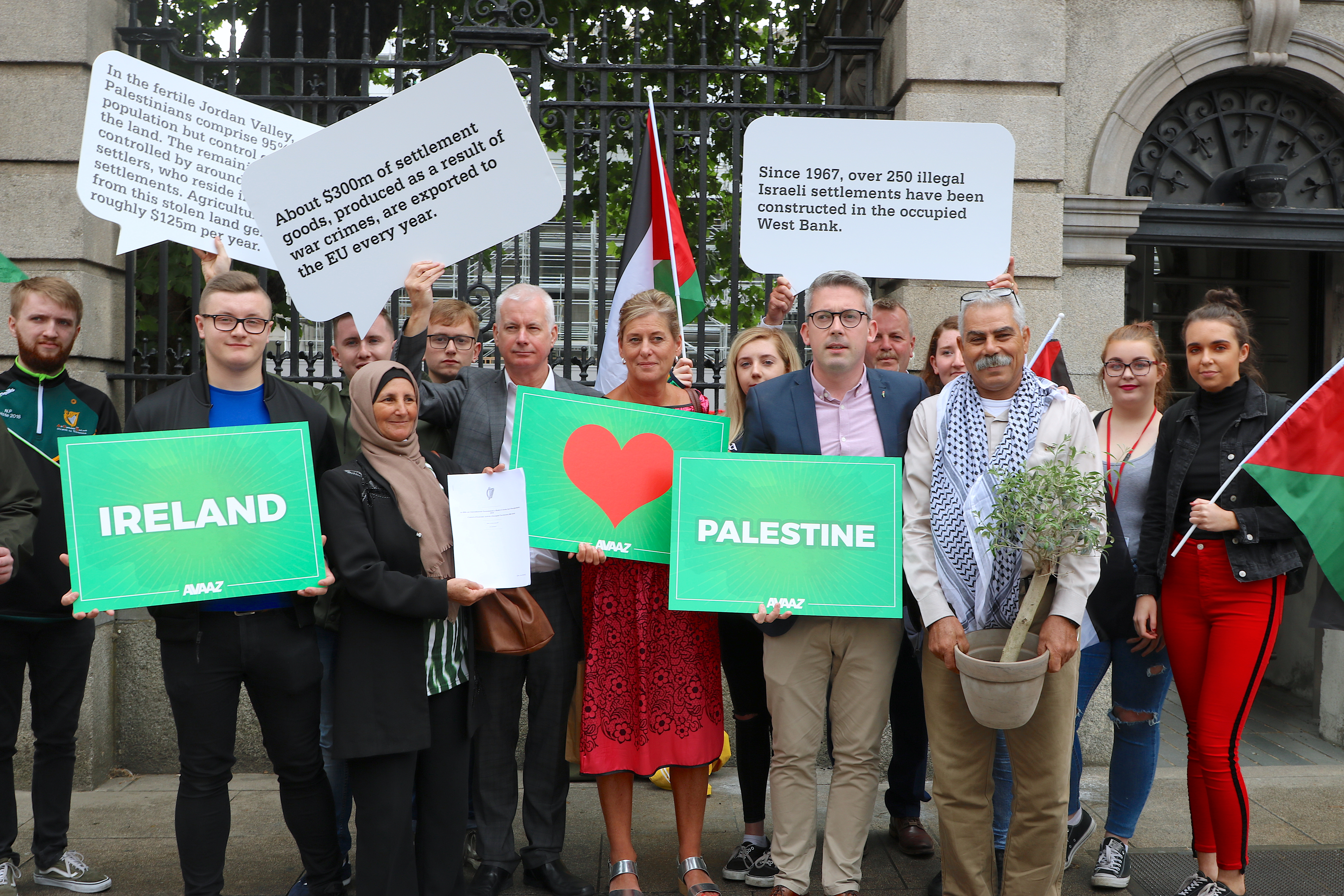
Niall Ó Donnghaile, Seán Crowe and members of Ógra Shinn Féin at a pro-Palestine rally held by the party in Dublin in 2017

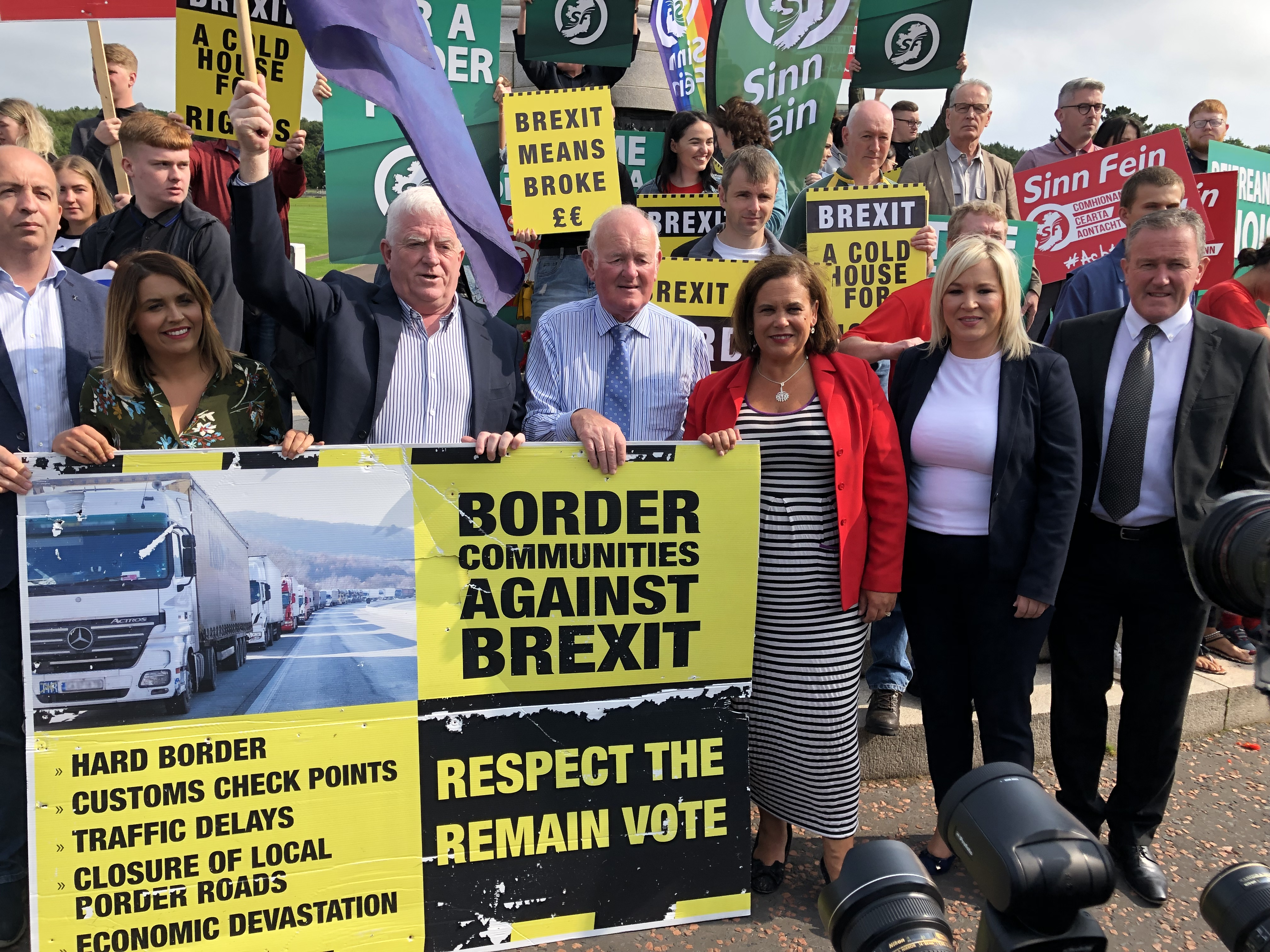
Members of Sinn Féin protesting against Brexit and a "hard border" being implemented between Northern Ireland and Ireland in 2019

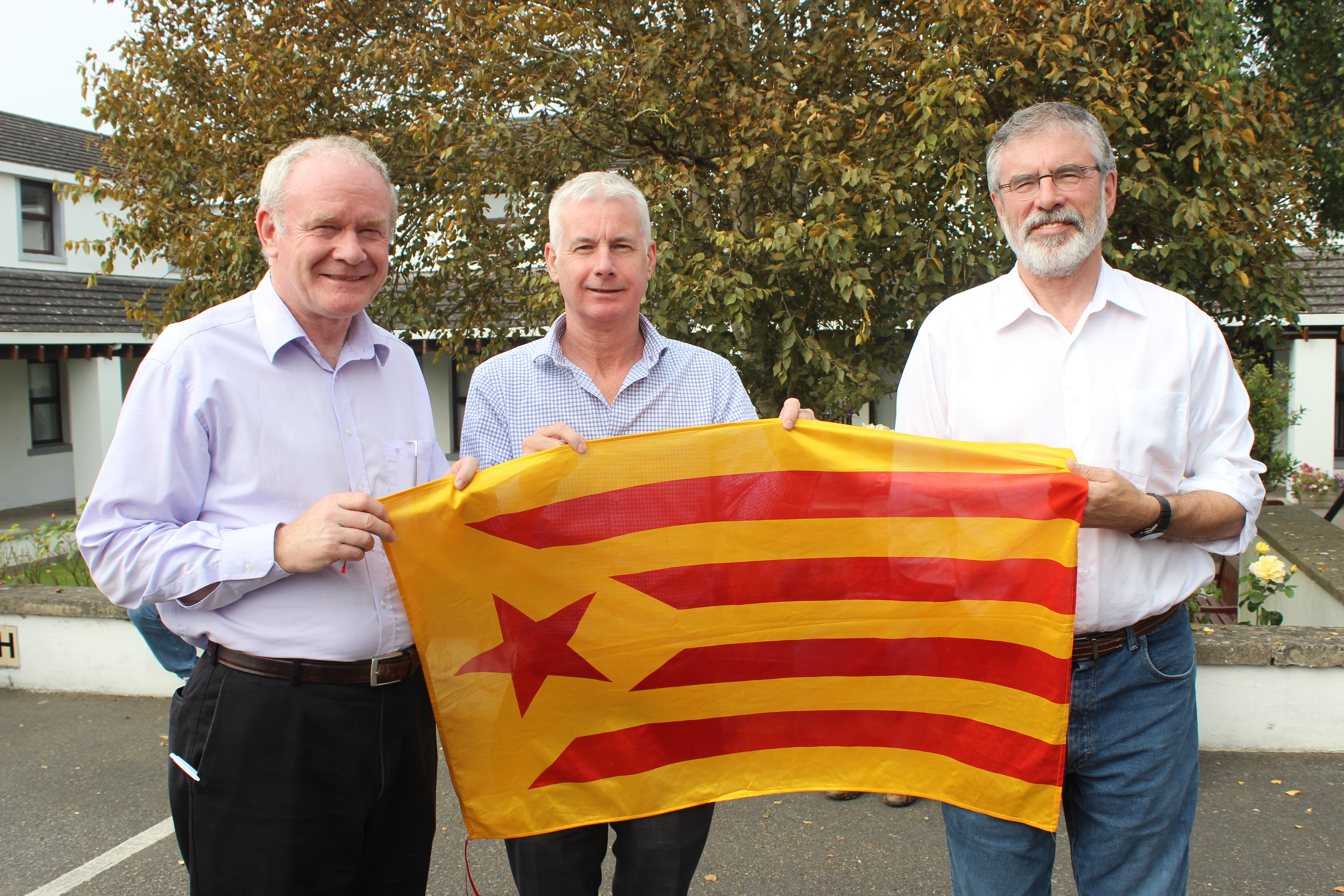
Martin McGuinness, Seán Crowe and Gerry Adams in 2014 showing their support for Catalan independence by holding a red Estelada

Sinn Féin has longstanding fraternal ties with the African National Congress and was described by Nelson Mandela as an "old friend and ally in the anti-apartheid struggle". Sinn Féin supports the independence of Catalonia from Spain, Palestine in the Israeli–Palestinian conflict, and the right to self-determination regarding independence of the Basque Country from Spain and France. Sinn Féin opposes the United States embargo against Cuba and has called for a normalisation of relations between the two countries. In 2016, the Sinn Féin party president, Gerry Adams was invited by the Cuban government to attend the state funeral of Fidel Castro whom Adams described as a "freedom fighter" and a "friend of Ireland's struggle". Sinn Féin is opposed to NATO membership.

==== European Union ====
Historically, Sinn Féin has been considered to be Eurosceptic. The party campaigned for a "No" vote in the Irish referendum on joining the European Economic Community in 1972. Sinn Féin was on the same side of the debate as the DUP and most of the Ulster Unionist Party (UUP) in that they wanted to pull out when the UK had its referendum in 1975. The party was critical of the supposed need for an EU constitution as proposed in 2002, and urged a "No" vote in the 2008 referendum on the Lisbon Treaty, although Mary Lou McDonald said that there was "no contradiction in being pro-Europe, but anti-treaty". In its manifesto for the 2015 UK general election, Sinn Féin pledged that the party would campaign for the UK to stay within the European Union (EU), with Martin McGuinness saying that an exit "would be absolutely economically disastrous". Gerry Adams said that, if there were to be a referendum on the question, there ought to be a separate and binding referendum for Northern Ireland. Its policy of a "Europe of Equals", and its critical engagement after 2001, together with its engagement with the European Parliament, marks a change from the party's previous opposition to the EU. The party expresses, on one hand, "support for Europe-wide measures that promote and enhance human rights, equality and the all-Ireland agenda", and on the other a "principled opposition" to a European superstate. This has led political commentators to define the party as soft Eurosceptic since the 21st century.

Since moving to this "soft Euroscepticism" position, Sinn Féin support a policy of "critical engagement with the EU", and have a "principled opposition" to a European superstate. It opposes an EU constitution because it would reduce the sovereignty of the member-states. It also critiques the EU on grounds of neoliberalism. Sinn Féin MEP Matt Carthy says "the European Union must become a cooperative union of nation states committed to working together on issues such as climate change, migration, trade, and using our common strengths to improve the lives of citizens. If it does not, EU disintegration becomes a real possibility". The party supported continued UK membership of the European Union in the UK's 2016 EU referendum and in April 2022, Mary Lou McDonald said in the Dáil that "We strongly support the Ukrainian people's stated desire to join the European Union".

== Leadership history ==
| Name | Dates | Notes |
|---|---|---|
| Edward Martyn | 1905–1908 | |
| John Sweetman | 1908–1911 | |
| Arthur Griffith | 1911–1917 | |
| Éamon de Valera | 1917–1926 | Resigned from Sinn Féin and formed Fianna Fáil in 1926 |
| John J. O'Kelly (Sceilg) | 1926–1931 | |
| Brian O'Higgins | 1931–1933 | |
| Michael O'Flanagan | 1933–1935 | |
| Cathal Ó Murchadha | 1935–1937 | |
| Margaret Buckley | 1937–1950 | Party's first woman president. |
| Paddy McLogan | 1950–1952 | |
| Tomás Ó Dubhghaill | 1952–1954 | |
| Paddy McLogan | 1954–1962 | |
| Tomás Mac Giolla | 1962–1970 | From 1970 was president of Official Sinn Féin, renamed The Workers' Party in 1982. |
| Ruairí Ó Brádaigh | 1970–1983 | Elected TD for Longford–Westmeath (1957–1961), did not sit in the Dáil. Left Sinn Féin and formed Republican Sinn Féin in 1986. |
| Gerry Adams | 1983–2018 | Longest-served president in the party's history and TD for Louth from 2011 to 2020. |
| Mary Lou McDonald | 2018–present | TD for Dublin Central since 2011. |

== Ministers and spokespeople ==
=== Northern Ireland ===
- First Minister: Michelle O'Neill
- Junior Minister: Aisling Reilly
- Minister for the Economy: Caoimhe Archibald
- Minister of Finance: John O'Dowd
- Minister of Infrastructure: Liz Kimmins

=== Republic of Ireland ===
| Portfolio | Name |
|---|---|
| Leader of the Opposition; President of Sinn Féin | Mary Lou McDonald |
| Deputy Leader of Sinn Féin in the Dáil; Spokesperson on Finance | Pearse Doherty |
| Spokesperson on Public Expenditure, Infrastructure, Public Service Reform and Digitalisation | Mairéad Farrell |
| Spokesperson on Education and Youth | Darren O'Rourke |
| Spokesperson on Environment and Climate Action | Pa Daly |
| Spokesperson on Community and Rural Development | Louise O'Reilly |
| Spokesperson on Social Protection | Louise O'Reilly |
| Spokesperson on Defence | Donnchadh Ó Laoghaire |
| Spokesperson on Foreign Affairs and Trade | Donnchadh Ó Laoghaire |
| Spokesperson on Children, Disability and Equality | Claire Kerrane |
| Spokesperson on Enterprise and Tourism | Rose Conway-Walsh |
| Spokesperson on Health | David Cullinane |
| Spokesperson on Arts, Media, Communications, Culture and Sport | Joanna Byrne |
| Spokesperson on Gaeilge and the Gaeltacht | Aengus Ó Snodaigh |
| Spokesperson on Housing, Local Government and Heritage | Eoin Ó Broin |
| Spokesperson on Justice, Home Affairs and Migration | Matt Carthy |
| Spokesperson on Further and Higher Education, Research, Innovation and Science | Donna McGettigan |
| Spokesperson on Agriculture, Food and the Marine | Martin Kenny |

Pádraig Mac Lochlainn serves as the party's Chief Whip in the Dáil.

== Election results ==
=== Northern Ireland ===
==== Devolved legislature elections ====
| Election | Leader | Body | Votes | % | Seats | +/– | Position | Status |
|---|---|---|---|---|---|---|---|---|
| 1921 | Éamon de Valera | House of Commons | 104,917 | 20.5 | 6 / 52 | ▲6 | ▲2nd | Abstention |
| 1982 | Ruairí Ó Brádaigh | Assembly | 64,191 | 10.1 | 5 / 78 | ▲5 | ▲5th | Abstention |
| 1996 | Gerry Adams | Forum | 116,377 | 15.5 | 17 / 110 | ▲17 | ▲4th | Abstention |
| 1998 | Gerry Adams | Assembly | 142,858 | 17.7 | 18 / 108 | ▲18 | ▲4th | Coalition |
| 2003 | Gerry Adams | Assembly | 162,758 | 23.5 | 24 / 108 | ▲6 | ▲3rd | Direct rule |
| 2007 | Gerry Adams | Assembly | 180,573 | 26.2 | 28 / 108 | ▲4 | ▲2nd | Coalition |
| 2011 | Gerry Adams | Assembly | 178,224 | 26.3 | 29 / 108 | ▲1 | 2nd | Coalition |
| 2016 | Gerry Adams | Assembly | 166,785 | 24.0 | 28 / 108 | ▼1 | 2nd | Coalition |
| 2017 | Gerry Adams | Assembly | 224,245 | 27.9 | 27 / 90 | ▼1 | 2nd | Coalition |
| 2022 | Mary Lou McDonald | Assembly | 250,388 | 29.0 | 27 / 90 | Steady | ▲1st | Coalition |

==== Westminster elections ====
| Election | Leader | Votes | % | | Seats (NI) | +/– | Position | Status |
| Election | Leader | Votes | NI | UK | Seats (NI) | +/– | Position | Status |
|---|---|---|---|---|---|---|---|---|
| 1924 | Éamon de Valera | 34,181 | | 0.2 | 0 / 13 | Steady | ▲9th | No seats |
| 1950 | Margaret Buckley | 23,362 | | 0.1 | 0 / 12 | Steady | ▼11th | No seats |
| 1955 | Paddy McLogan | 152,310 | | 0.6 | 2 / 12 | ▲2 | ▲4th | Abstention |
| 1959 | Paddy McLogan | 63,415 | | 0.2 | 0 / 12 | ▼2 | ▼5th | No seats |
| 1983 | Ruairí Ó Brádaigh | 102,701 | 13.4 | 0.3 | 1 / 17 | ▲1 | ▲8th | Abstention |
| 1987 | Gerry Adams | 83,389 | 11.4 | 0.3 | 1 / 17 | Steady | ▲6th | Abstention |
| 1992 | Gerry Adams | 78,291 | 10.0 | 0.2 | 0 / 17 | ▼1 | ▼11th | No seats |
| 1997 | Gerry Adams | 126,921 | 16.1 | 0.4 | 2 / 18 | ▲2 | ▲8th | Abstention |
| 2001 | Gerry Adams | 175,933 | 21.7 | 0.7 | 4 / 18 | ▲2 | ▲6th | Abstention |
| 2005 | Gerry Adams | 174,530 | 24.3 | 0.6 | 5 / 18 | ▲1 | 6th | Abstention |
| 2010 | Gerry Adams | 171,942 | 25.5 | 0.6 | 5 / 18 | Steady | 6th | Abstention |
| 2015 | Gerry Adams | 176,232 | 24.5 | 0.6 | 4 / 18 | ▼1 | 6th | Abstention |
| 2017 | Gerry Adams | 238,915 | 29.4 | 0.7 | 7 / 18 | ▲3 | 6th | Abstention |
| 2019 | Mary Lou McDonald | 181,853 | 22.8 | 0.6 | 7 / 18 | Steady | 6th | Abstention |
| 2024 | Mary Lou McDonald | 210,891 | 27.0 | 0.7 | 7 / 18 | Steady | ▲5th | Abstention |

==== Trends ====
The party overtook its nationalist rival, the SDLP, as the largest nationalist party in the local elections and UK general election of 2001, winning four Westminster seats to the SDLP's three. The party continues to subscribe, however, to an abstentionist policy towards the Westminster British parliament, on account of opposing that parliament's jurisdiction in Northern Ireland, as well as its oath to the King.

Results in Northern Ireland from UK general elections. Sinn Féin increased its number of seats from two in 1997 to five in 2005, four of them in the west. It retained its five seats in 2010, was reduced to four in 2015 before increasing to seven in 2017.

Sinn Féin increased its share of the nationalist vote in the 2003, 2007, and 2011 Assembly elections, with Martin McGuinness, former Minister for Education, taking the post of Deputy First Minister in the Northern Ireland power-sharing Executive Committee. The party has three ministers in the Executive.

In the 2010 general election, the party retained its five seats, and for the first time topped the poll at a Westminster election in Northern Ireland, winning 25.5% of the vote. All Sinn Féin MPs increased their share of the vote and with the exception of Fermanagh and South Tyrone, increased their majorities. In Fermanagh and South Tyrone, Unionist parties agreed a joint candidate, this resulted in the closest contest of the election, with Sinn Féin MP Michelle Gildernew holding her seat by 4 votes after 3 recounts and an election petition challenging the result.

Sinn Féin lost some ground in the 2016 Assembly election, dropping one seat to finish with 28, ten behind the DUP. In the snap election eight months later caused by the resignation of McGuinness as Deputy First Minister, however, the party surged, winning 27.9% of the popular vote to 28.1% for the DUP, and 27 seats to the DUP's 28 in an Assembly reduced by 18 seats. The withdrawal of the DUP party whip from Jim Wells in May 2018 meant that Sinn Féin became the joint-largest party in the Assembly alongside the DUP, with 27 seats each.

=== Republic of Ireland ===
==== Dáil Éireann elections ====
| Election | Leader | FPV | % | Seats | % | ± | Dáil | Government |
|---|---|---|---|---|---|---|---|---|
| 1918 (Westminster) | Éamon de Valera | 476,087 | 46.9 (#1) | 73 / 105 | 69.5 (#1) | New | 1st | Government; 1st, 2nd ministry (SF majority) |
| 1921 (S. Ireland HoC) | Éamon de Valera | Elected unopposed | | 124 / 128 | 96.9 (#1) | ▲51 | 2nd | Government; 3rd, 4th ministry (SF majority) |
| 1922 | Michael Collins (Pro-Treaty) | 239,195 | 38.5 (#1) | 58 / 128 | 45.3 (#1) | ▼30 | 3rd | Government; 5th ministry, 1st executive (SF PT/CnG minority) |
| 1922 | Éamon de Valera (Anti-Treaty) | 135,310 | 21.8 (#2) | 36 / 128 | 28.1 (#2) | ▼30 | 3rd | Abstention; 5th ministry, 1st executive (SF PT/CnG minority) |
| 1923 | Éamon de Valera (Anti-Treaty) | 288,794 | 27.4 (#2) | 44 / 153 | 28.8 (#2) | ▲8 | 4th | Abstention; 2nd executive (CnG minority) |
| June 1927 | John J. O'Kelly | 41,401 | 3.6 (#6) | 5 / 153 | 3.3 (#2) | ▼39 | 5th | Abstention; 3rd executive (CnG minority) |
Did not contest September 1927 general election to 1951 general election
| 1954 | Tomás Ó Dubhghaill | 1,990 | 0.1 (#6) | 0 / 147 | —N/a | Steady | 15th | No Seats; 7th government (FG-Lab-CnT minority) |
| 1957 | Paddy McLogan | 65,640 | 5.3 (#4) | 4 / 147 | 2.6 (#4) | ▲4 | 16th | Abstention; 8th, 9th government (FF majority) |
| 1961 | Paddy McLogan | 36,396 | 3.1 (#4) | 0 / 144 | —N/a | ▼4 | 17th | No seats 10th government (FF majority) |
Did not contest 1965 general election to 1981 general election
| Feb. 1982 | Ruairí Ó Brádaigh | 16,894 | 1.0 (#5) | 0 / 166 | —N/a | Steady | 23rd | No seats 18th government (FF minority) |
Did not contest November 1982 general election
| 1987 | Gerry Adams | 32,933 | 1.9 (#6) | 0 / 166 | —N/a | Steady | 25th | No seats 20th government (FF minority) |
| 1989 | Gerry Adams | 20,003 | 1.2 (#6) | 0 / 166 | —N/a | Steady | 26th | No seats 21st, 22nd government (FF-PD majority) |
| 1992 | Gerry Adams | 27,809 | 1.6 (#7) | 0 / 166 | — | Steady | 27th | No seats 23rd government (FF-Lab majority) |
| 1992 | Gerry Adams | 27,809 | 1.6 (#7) | 0 / 166 | — | Steady | 27th | No seats 24th government (FG-Lab-DL majority) |
| 1997 | Gerry Adams | 45,614 | 2.5 (#7) | 1 / 166 | 0.6 (#7) | ▲1 | 28th | Opposition; 25th government (FF-PD minority) |
| 2002 | Gerry Adams | 121,020 | 6.5 (#6) | 5 / 166 | 3.0 (#6) | ▲4 | 29th | Opposition; 26th government (FF-PD majority) |
| 2007 | Gerry Adams | 143,410 | 6.9 (#5) | 4 / 166 | 2.4 (#6) | ▼1 | 30th | Opposition; 27th, 28th government (FF-GP-PD/Ind majority) |
| 2011 | Gerry Adams | 220,661 | 9.9 (#4) | 14 / 166 | 8.4 (#4) | ▲10 | 31st | Opposition; 29th government (FG-Lab majority) |
| 2016 | Gerry Adams | 295,319 | 13.8 (#3) | 23 / 158 | 14.6 (#3) | ▲9 | 32nd | Opposition; 30th, 31st government (FG-Ind minority) |
| 2020 | Mary Lou McDonald | 535,595 | 24.5 (#1) | 37 / 160 | 23.1 (#2) | ▲14 | 33rd | Opposition; 32nd, 33rd, 34th government (FF-FG-GP majority) |
| 2024 | Mary Lou McDonald | 418,627 | 19.0 (#3) | 39 / 174 | 22.4 (#2) | ▲2 | 34th | Opposition; 35th government (FF-FG-Ind majority) |

The party had five TDs elected in the 2002 Irish general election, an increase of four from the previous election. At the general election in 2007 the party had expectations of substantial gains, with poll predictions that they would gain five to ten seats. However, the party lost one of its seats to Fine Gael. Seán Crowe, who had topped the poll in Dublin South-West fell to fifth place, with his first preference vote reduced from 20.28% to 12.16%.

On 26 November 2010, Pearse Doherty won a seat in the Donegal South-West by-election. It was the party's first by-election victory in the Republic of Ireland since 1925. After negotiations with the left-wing Independent TDs Finian McGrath and Maureen O'Sullivan, a Technical Group was formed in the Dáil to give its members more speaking time.

In the 2011 Irish general election the party made significant gains. All its sitting TDs were returned, with Seán Crowe regaining the seat he had lost in 2007 in Dublin South-West. In addition to winning long-targeted seats such as Dublin Central and Dublin North-West, the party gained unexpected seats in Cork East and Sligo–North Leitrim. It ultimately won 14 seats, the best performance at the time for the party's current incarnation. The party went on to win three seats in the Seanad election which followed their success at the general election. In the 2016 election it made further gains, finishing with 23 seats and overtaking the Labour Party as the third-largest party in the Dáil It ran seven candidates in the Seanad election, all of whom were successful.

The party achieved their greatest contemporary result in the 2020 Irish general election, topping the first-preference votes with 24.5% and winning 37 seats. Due to poor results in the 2019 local elections and elections to the European Parliament, the party ran only 42 candidates and did not compete in Cork North-West. The party achieved unexpected success in the early counting, with 27 candidates being elected on the first count. Party leader Mary Lou McDonald called the result a "revolution" and announced she would pursue the formation of a government including Sinn Féin. Ultimately negotiations to form a new government led to Fianna Fáil, Fine Gael and the Green Party agreeing to enter a majority coalition government in June. Sinn Féin pledged to be a strong opposition to the new coalition.

==== Presidential elections ====
| Election | Nominee | Party | Alliance | 1st | Final |
Did not contest any presidential election until 2004
| 2004 | Mary McAleese | IND | List: Fianna Fáil; Fine Gael; Labour; Progressive Democrats; Green | Unopposed | |
| 2011 | Martin McGuinness | SF | —N/a | 13.7% | —N/a |
| 2018 | Liadh Ní Riada | SF | —N/a | 6.4% | —N/a |
| 2025 | Catherine Connolly | IND | List: Labour; Social Democrats; PBP–Solidarity; Green Party; 100% Redress; Independents | 63.4% | —N/a |

==== Local government elections ====
| Election | Country | First pref. vote | Vote % | Seats |
|---|---|---|---|---|
| 1920 | Ireland | – | 27.0% | – |
| 1974 | Republic of Ireland | – | – | 7 / 802 |
| 1979 | Republic of Ireland | – | – | 11 / 798 |
| 1985 | Northern Ireland | 75,686 | 11.8% | 59 / 565 |
| 1985 | Republic of Ireland | 46,391 | 3.3% | – |
| 1989 | Northern Ireland | 69,032 | 11.2% | 43 / 565 |
| 1991 | Republic of Ireland | 29,054 | 2.1% | 8 / 883 |
| 1993 | Northern Ireland | 77,600 | 12.0% | 51 / 582 |
| 1997 | Northern Ireland | 106,934 | 17.0% | 74 / 575 |
| 1999 | Republic of Ireland | 49,192 | 3.5% | 21 / 883 |
| 2001 | Northern Ireland | 163,269 | 21.0% | 108 / 582 |
| 2004 | Republic of Ireland | 146,391 | 8.0% | 54 / 883 |
| 2005 | Northern Ireland | 163,205 | 23.2% | 126 / 582 |
| 2009 | Republic of Ireland | 138,405 | 7.4% | 54 / 883 |
| 2011 | Northern Ireland | 163,712 | 24.8% | 138 / 583 |
| 2014 | Northern Ireland | 151,137 | 24.1% | 105 / 462 |
| 2014 | Republic of Ireland | 258,650 | 15.2% | 159 / 949 |
| 2019 | Northern Ireland | 157,448 | 23.2% | 105 / 462 |
| 2019 | Republic of Ireland | 164,637 | 9.5% | 81 / 949 |
| 2023 | Northern Ireland | 230,793 | 30.9% | 144 / 462 |
| 2024 | Republic of Ireland | 218,620 | 11.8% | 102 / 949 |

Sinn Féin is represented on most county and city councils. It made large gains in the local elections of 2004, increasing its number of councillors from 21 to 54, and replacing the Progressive Democrats as the fourth-largest party in local government. At the local elections of June 2009, the party's vote fell by 0.95% to 7.34%, with no change in the number of seats. Losses in Dublin and urban areas were balanced by gains in areas such as Limerick, Wicklow, Cork, Tipperary and Kilkenny and the border counties . However, three of Sinn Féin's seven representatives on Dublin City Council resigned within six months of the June 2009 elections, one of them defecting to the Labour Party.

=== European Parliament elections ===
In the 2004 European Parliament election, Bairbre de Brún won Sinn Féin's first seat in the European Parliament, at the expense of the SDLP. She came in second behind Jim Allister of the DUP. In the 2009 election, de Brún was re-elected with 126,184 first preference votes, the only candidate to reach the quota on the first count. This was the first time since elections began in 1979 that the DUP failed to take the first seat, and was the first occasion Sinn Féin topped a poll in any Northern Ireland election.

Sinn Féin made a breakthrough in the Dublin constituency in 2004. The party's candidate, Mary Lou McDonald, was elected on the sixth count as one of four MEPs for Dublin. In the 2009 election, when Dublin's representation was reduced to three MEPs, she failed to hold her seat. In the South constituency their candidate, Councillor Toiréasa Ferris, managed to nearly double the number of first preference votes, lying third after the first count, but failed to get enough transfers to win a seat. In the 2014 election, Martina Anderson topped the poll in Northern Ireland, as did Lynn Boylan in Dublin. Liadh Ní Riada was elected in the South constituency, and Matt Carthy in Midlands–North-West. In the 2019 election, Carthy was re-elected, but Boylan and Ní Riada lost their seats. Anderson also held her Northern Ireland seat until early 2020 when her term was cut short by Brexit.

==== Republic of Ireland ====
| Election | Leader | 1st pref. votes | % | Seats | +/− | EP group |
|---|---|---|---|---|---|---|
| 1984 | Gerry Adams | 54,672 | 4.88 (#4) | 0 / 15 | New | − |
| 1989 | Gerry Adams | 35,923 | 2.20 (#8) | 0 / 15 | Steady | − |
| 1994 | Gerry Adams | 33,823 | 2.97 (#7) | 0 / 15 | Steady | − |
| 1999 | Gerry Adams | 88,165 | 6.33 (#5) | 0 / 15 | Steady | − |
| 2004 | Gerry Adams | 197,715 | 11.10 (#3) | 1 / 13 | ▲1 | GUE/NGL |
| 2009 | Gerry Adams | 205,613 | 11.24 (#5) | 0 / 12 | ▼1 | GUE/NGL |
| 2014 | Gerry Adams | 323,300 | 19.52 (#3) | 3 / 11 | ▲3 | GUE/NGL |
| 2019 | Mary Lou McDonald | 196,001 | 11.68 (#3) | 1 / 13 | ▼2 | The Left |
| 2024 | Mary Lou McDonald | 194,403 | 11.14 (#3) | 2 / 14 | ▲1 | The Left |

==== Northern Ireland ====
| Election | Leader | 1st pref. votes | % | Seats | +/− | EP group |
|---|---|---|---|---|---|---|
| 1984 | Danny Morrison | 91,476 | 13.35 (#4) | 0 / 3 | New | − |
| 1989 | Danny Morrison | 48,914 | 9.15 (#4) | 0 / 3 | Steady | − |
| 1994 | Tom Hartley | 55,215 | 9.86 (#4) | 0 / 3 | Steady | − |
| 1999 | Mitchel McLaughlin | 117,643 | 17.33 (#4) | 0 / 3 | Steady | − |
| 2004 | Bairbre de Brún | 144,541 | 26.31 (#2) | 1 / 3 | ▲1 | GUE/NGL |
| 2009 | Bairbre de Brún | 126,184 | 25.81 (#1) | 1 / 3 | Steady | GUE/NGL |
| 2014 | Martina Anderson | 159,813 | 25.52 (#1) | 1 / 3 | Steady | GUE/NGL |
| 2019 | Martina Anderson | 126,951 | 22.17 (#1) | 1 / 3 | Steady | The Left |

== See also ==
- Friends of Sinn Féin (an international organisation designed to support Sinn Féin's cause, with members in Great Britain, the United States, Canada, and Australia)
- List of current Sinn Féin elected representatives
- List of political parties in Northern Ireland
- List of political parties in the Republic of Ireland
- List of Sinn Féin MPs (for members elected to the British Parliament)

== General and cited sources ==
- Adams, Gerry (1996). Before the Dawn. Brandon Book. ISBN 978-0-434-00341-9.
- Bean, Kevin (15 February 2008). The New Politics of Sinn Fein. Oxford University Press. ISBN 978-1-78138-780-1. Archived from the original on 29 May 2016.
- Bourne, Angela K. (26 July 2018). Democratic Dilemmas: Why democracies ban political parties. Routledge. ISBN 9781138898011.
- Anderson, Brendan (2002). Joe Cahill: A Life in the IRA. Dublin: O'Brien Press. ISBN 978-0-86278-674-8.
- Bell, J Bowyer (1997). The Secret Army: The IRA (3rd ed.). Dublin: Poolbeg Press. ISBN 978-1-85371-813-7.
- Bew, Paul; Gillespie, Gordon (1993). Northern Ireland: A Chronology of the Troubles 1968–1993. Dublin: Gill & Macmillan. ISBN 978-0-7171-2081-9.
- Coogan, Tim Pat (2000). The I.R.A. London: HarperCollins. ISBN 978-0-00-653155-5.
- Culloty, Eileen; Suiter, Jane (2018). "Journalism Norms and the Absence of Media Populism in the Irish General Election 2016". In Susana Salgado (ed.). Mediated Campaigns and Populism in Europe. Springer. ISBN 978-3-319-98563-3. Archived from the original on 8 July 2020.
- Ellis, Peter Berresford (2004). Eyewitness to Irish History. Canada: John Wiley & Sons, Inc. ISBN 978-0-471-26633-4.
- Feeney, Brian (2002). Sinn Féin: A Hundred Turbulent Years. Dublin: O'Brien Press. ISBN 978-1-85371-813-7.
- Ferriter, Diarmaid (2005). The Transformation of Ireland 1900–2000. London: Profile Books. ISBN 978-1-86197-443-3.
- Flackes, W.D.; Elliott, Sydney (1994). "Provisional Sinn Féin". Northern Ireland: A Political Directory 1968–1993. Belfast: Blackstaff Press. ISBN 9780717139927.
- Frampton, Martyn (2009). The Long March: The Political Strategy of Sinn Féin, 1981–2007. Palgrave Macmillan. ISBN 978-0-230-20217-7.
- Gallagher, Michael (1985). Political Parties in the Republic of Ireland. Manchester University Press. ISBN 978-0-7190-1797-1.
- Gallagher, Michael; Marsh, Michael (18 October 2011). How Ireland Voted 2011: The Full Story of Ireland's Earthquake Election. Springer. ISBN 978-0-230-35400-5. Archived from the original on 5 March 2017.
- Gallagher, Michael; Marsh, Michael (27 October 2016). How Ireland Voted 2016: The Election that Nobody Won. Springer. ISBN 978-3-319-40889-7. Archived from the original on 5 March 2017.
- Griffith, Arthur (1904). The Resurrection of Hungary: A Parallel for Ireland. Dublin: James Duffy & Co., M.H. Gill & Son, Sealy, Bryers & Walker. (1st edition at the Internet Archive, 3rd edition at the Internet Archive)
- Hanley, Brian; Millar, Scott (2009). The Lost Revolution: The Story of the Official IRA and the Workers' Party. Dublin: Penguin Ireland. ISBN 978-1-84488-120-8.
- Kee, Robert (2005). Ireland: A History (Revised ed.). London: Abacus. ISBN 978-0-349-11676-1.
- Laffan, Michael (1999). The Resurrection of Ireland: The Sinn Féin Party 1916–1923. Cambridge: Cambridge University Press. ISBN 978-0521650731.
- Mac Donncha, Mícheál, ed. (2005). Sinn Féin: A Century of Struggle (in Irish and English). Dublin: Republican Books. ISBN 978-0-9542946-2-5.
- Mac Stíofáin, Seán (1975). Revolutionary in Ireland. London: Gordon Cremonesi. ISBN 0-86033-031-1.
- Maillot, Agnès (2005). New Sinn Féin: Irish republicanism in the twenty-first century. Routledge. ISBN 0-415-32197-2.
- Murray, Gerard; Tonge, Jonathan (2005). Sinn Féin and the SDLP: From Alienation to Participation. Dublin: O'Brien Press. p. 153. ISBN 978-0-86278-918-3.
- O'Brien, Brendan (1 August 1995). The Long War: The IRA and Sinn Féin, Second Edition. Syracuse University Press. ISBN 978-0-8156-0597-3.
- O'Brien, Brendan (2019). A Short History of the IRA: From 1916 Onwards. The O'Brien Press. ISBN 9781788491167. Archived from the original on 5 January 2022.
- Patterson, Henry (2006). Ireland Since 1939. Dublin: Penguin Ireland.
- Rafter, Kevin (2005). Sinn Féin, 1905–2005: In the Shadow of Gunmen. Dublin: Gill & Macmillan. ISBN 9780717139927.
- Taylor, Peter (1997). Provos The IRA & Sinn Féin. Bloomsbury Publishing. ISBN 978-0-7475-3818-9.
- Sanders, Andrew (2011). Inside the IRA: Dissident Republicans and the War for Legitimacy. Edinburgh University Press. ISBN 978-0748641123. Archived from the original on 4 January 2022.
- Sinnott, Richard (1995). Irish voters decide: voting behaviour in elections and referendums since 1918. Manchester University Press. ISBN 978-0-7190-4037-5.
- Suiter, Jane (2016). "Ireland: The Rise of Populism on the Left and among Independents". In Toril Aalberg; Frank Esser; Carsten Reinemann; Jesper Stromback; Claes De Vreese (eds.). Populist Political Communication in Europe. Routledge. ISBN 978-1-317-22474-7. Archived from the original on 9 May 2022.
- White, Robert W. (2006). Ruairí Ó Brádaigh, the Life and Politics of an Irish Revolutionary. Indiana University Press. ISBN 978-0-253-34708-4.
- White, Robert (2017). Out of the Ashes: An Oral History of the Provisional Irish Republican Movement. Merrion Press. ISBN 978-1-78537-093-9.
