= 2024 Fingal County Council election =

Part of the 2024 Irish local elections

- 7 June 2024

All 40 seats on Fingal County Council 21 seats needed for a majority
- Results by Local Electoral Area

An election to all 40 seats on Fingal County Council was held on 7 June 2024 as part of the 2024 Irish local elections. Fingal is divided into 7 local electoral areas (LEAs) to elect councillors for a five-year term of office on the electoral system of proportional representation by means of the single transferable vote (PR-STV).

== Campaign ==
On 8 May, councillor Tania Doyle and her husband, while erecting election posters, were assaulted by a man shouting anti-immigration and anti-Muslim rhetoric while an accomplice filmed it. Her husband was left bleeding, bruised and knocked to the ground by the assault which also saw Doyle herself punched in the head after she attempted to shield her husband. The assault lasted 15 minutes and only ended when the accomplice pulled the assaulter away from kicking Doyle's husband while on the ground. Doyle stated she feared for their lives and would not be canvassing for the remainder of the election. The Gardaí stated that they are investigating the matter.

== Results by party ==
Party	First-preference votes			Seats			
Party	Votes	% FPv	Swing (pp)	Cand.	2019	Elected 2024	Change
Fine Gael	14,096	16.37	▼0.56	9	7	7	Steady
Labour	12,275	14.25	▲1.07	8	6	7	▲1
Fianna Fáil	14,723	17.10	▼0.15	13	8	6	▼2
Sinn Féin	9,615	11.17	▲2.09	15	4	4	Steady
Social Democrats	5,630	6.54	▲0.63	5	2	2	Steady
Aontú	3,859	4.48	▲2.28	4	0	2	▲2
Solidarity	2,401	2.79	▼0.86	3	1	2	▲1
Green	5,134	5.96	▼8.11	7	5	1	▼4
Inds. 4 Change	2,000	2.32	▲0.68	1	1	1	Steady
National Party	456	0.53	New	1	New	1	▲1
People Before Profit	926	1.08	▲0.75	3	0	0	Steady
Irish Freedom	750	0.87	New	2	New	0	Steady
The Irish People	139	0.16	New	1	New	0	Steady
Independent	14,112	16.39	▲0.66	19	6	7	▲1
Total Valid	86,116	98.66					
Spoilt votes	1,172	1.34					
Total	87,288	100.00	—	91	40	40	Steady
Registered voters/Turnout	208,819	41.80					

== Results by LEA ==
*: Outgoing councillor elected in 2019.
†: Outgoing councillor coopted subsequent to the 2019 election.

=== Balbriggan ===
Balbriggan: 5 seats
Party	Candidate	FPv%	Count									
Party	Candidate	FPv%	1	2	3	4	5	6	7	8	9	10
Independent	Tony Murphy	19.48	2,148									
Labour	Brendan Ryan	14.47	1,595	1,627	1,637	1,660	1,680	1,736	1,779	2,009		
Fine Gael	Tom O'Leary	13.07	1,441	1,463	1,469	1,484	1,501	1,519	1,544	1,886		
Independent	Grainne Maguire	12.05	1,328	1,470	1,516	1,560	1,679	1,768	1,887			
Green	Karen Power	9.63	1,062	1,071	1,073	1,098	1,099	1,192	1,216	1,370	1,452	1,459
Fianna Fáil	Sinéad Lucey Brennan	7.41	817	835	839	855	861	883	921			
Sinn Féin	Malachy Quinn	7.29	804	831	845	871	884	945	1,454	1,504	1,517	1,559
Sinn Féin	Anne Marie Brady	6.15	678	695	702	722	736	837				
People Before Profit	Bryn Edwards	3.93	433	442	452	494	509					
Irish Freedom	John Oakes	2.93	323	333	367	373						
Independent	Oghenetano John Uwhumiakpor	2.16	238	249	246							
Independent	Derek Mcloughlin	1.22	134	145								
Independent	Aneta Laska	0.21	23	25								
Electorate: 25,174 Valid: 11,024 Spoilt: 128 Quota: 1,838 Turnout: 11,152 (44.30%)

=== Blanchardstown–Mulhuddart ===
Blanchardstown–Mulhuddart: 5 seats
Party	Candidate	FPv%	Count											
Party	Candidate	FPv%	1	2	3	4	5	6	7	8	9	10	11	12
Labour	Mary McCamley	11.14	685	711	715	737	745	836	896	945	974	1,002	1,105	
Fianna Fáil	John-Kingley Onwumereh	10.82	665	671	671	687	697	724	891	908	925	937	1,001	1,021
Fine Gael	Steve O'Reilly	9.30	572	589	589	619	625	653	729	750	766	775	816	835
Sinn Féin	Breda Hanaphy	8.51	523	524	526	533	663	689	724	773	1,155			
Solidarity	John Burtchaell	7.77	478	485	495	508	522	602	615	673	717	764	840	855
Aontú	Robbie Loughlin	7.60	467	469	483	488	495	538	550	604	617	640		
National Party	Patrick Quinlan	7.42	456	456	508	508	515	521	528	665	673	684	838	855
Fianna Fáil	Lorna Nolan	7.11	437	438	440	447	451	461						
Sinn Féin	Damien Bissett	6.55	403	405	407	417	515	543	555	569				
Independent	Susanne Delaney	6.55	388	392	411	439	451	471	488					
Social Democrats	Neil Dowling	5.94	365	383	387	397	402							
Sinn Féin	Louise Kavanagh	5.09	313	314	316	317								
Independent	Shashank Chakerwarti	2.64	162	164	167									
The Irish People	Andy Heasman	2.26	139	140										
Green	Oisín Ó hAlmhain	1.55	95											
Electorate: 19,395 Valid: 6,148 Spoilt: 156 (2.47%) Quota: 1,025 Turnout: 6,304 (32.50%)

=== Castleknock ===
Castleknock: 6 seats
Party	Candidate	FPv%	Count							
Party	Candidate	FPv%	1	2	3	4	5	6	7	8
Fine Gael	Ted Leddy	15.26	2,153							
Labour	John Walsh	13.73	1,937	1,952	2,045					
Fine Gael	Siobhan Shovlin	13.40	1,891	1,962	2,006	2,011	2,364			
Aontú	Ellen Troy	11.86	1,674	1,682	1,729	1,730	1,795	1,815	2,087	
Solidarity	Ruth Coppinger†††	11.00	1,553	1,556	1,671	1,678	1,951	1,990	2,429	
Fianna Fáil	Eimear Carbone-Mangan	8.02	1,132	1,148	1,165	1,167	1,317	1,451	1,508	1,584
Fianna Fáil	Howard Mahony	7.92	1,118	1,134	1,144	1,146	1,276	1,332	1,395	1,459
Sinn Féin	Philip Lynam	7.90	1,115	1,116	1,171	1,172	1,221	1,229		
Green	Pamela Conroy	7.19	1,015	1,021	1,113	1,124				
Social Democrats	Luke Daly	3.67	519	520						
Electorate: 34,239 Valid: 14,107 Spoilt: 156 (1.09%) Quota: 2,016 Turnout: 14,263 (41.65%)

=== Howth–Malahide ===
Howth–Malahide: 7 seats
Party	Candidate	FPv%	Count							
Party	Candidate	FPv%	1	2	3	4	5	6	7	8
Social Democrats	Joan Hopkins	15.64	3,272							
Fine Gael	Aoibhinn Tormey	11.39	2,383	2,507	2,550	2,612	2,637			
Fianna Fáil	Cathal Haughey	10.80	2,260	2,305	2,335	2,411	2,498	2,710		
Fianna Fáil	Eoghan O'Brien	10.23	2,139	2,155	2,164	2,224	2,269	2,400	2,437	2,490
Labour	Brian McDonagh	10.11	2,114	2,210	2,234	2,275	2,455	2,568	2,628	
Fine Gael	Anthony Lavin	8.45	1,767	1,782	1,794	1,836	1,857	2,036	2,078	2,108
Independent	Jimmy Guerin	8.10	1,695	1,770	1,910	2,115	2,379	2,814		
Green	David Healy	7.61	1,591	1,742	1,788	1,828	1,955	2,082	2,142	2,154
Independent	Margaret Donnellan	5.40	1,130	1,157	1,218	1,389	1,553			
Sinn Féin	Tara Bailey	4.57	956	1,006	1,240	1,301				
Aontú	Margaret McGovern	4.28	896	914	989					
Sinn Féin	Kevin Doherty	1.58	331	350						
Independent	Jamie McGlue	1.21	253	263						
Independent	Vedh Kannan	0.38	80	87						
Independent	Motseta Rachel Ndlovu	0.24	50	54						
Electorate: 46,575 Valid: 20,917 Spoilt: 232 Quota: 2,615 Turnout: 21,149 (45.41%)

=== Ongar ===
Ongar: 5 seats
Party	Candidate	FPv%	Count										
Party	Candidate	FPv%	1	2	3	4	5	6	7	8	9	10	11
Independent	Tania Doyle	24.06	2,057										
Sinn Féin	Angela Donnelly	13.05	1,116	1,227	1,232	1,247	1,257	1,406	1,739				
Fine Gael	Kieran Dennison	10.05	860	934	937	973	1,017	1,020	1,027	1,032	1,036	1,061	1,212
Fianna Fáil	Tom Kitt	9.76	835	907	909	920	945	951	960	981	1,000	1,024	1,217
Aontú	Gerard Sheehan	9.61	822	924	931	942	961	973	978	1,026	1,225	1,322	1,396
Fianna Fáil	Ali Asad	7.48	640	664	665	686	707	711	716	725	725	752	
Irish Freedom	Paul Fitzsimons	4.99	427	466	474	477	478	482	487	515			
Social Democrats	Ellen Murphy	4.65	398	459	470	503	591	608	614	656	683	924	972
Solidarity	Kate Relihan	4.33	370	413	446	462	486	499	510	558	588		
Sinn Féin	Declan Cairns	3.84	328	340	340	345	346	408					
Sinn Féin	Niall O'Donoghue	2.99	256	279	282	287	288						
Green	Michelle Griffin	2.37	203	236	240	259							
Labour	Nekesa Nancy Khisa	1.8	160	186	189								
People Before Profit	Andrew Doyle	0.92	79	90									
Electorate: 22,871 Valid: 8,551 Spoilt: 125 Quota: 1,426 Turnout: 8,676 (37.93%)

=== Rush–Lusk ===
Rush–Lusk: 5 seats
Party	Candidate	FPv%	Count					
Party	Candidate	FPv%	1	2	3	4	5	6
Labour	Robert O'Donoghue††	25.99	3,185					
Labour	Corina Johnston	14.00	1,716	1,952	2,068			
Independent	Cathal Boland	11.41	1,399	1,497	1,691	1,694	1,878	1,951
Fine Gael	Eoghan Dockrell	11.32	1,387	1,602	1,671	1,676	1,731	2,001
Fianna Fáil	Brian Dennehy	9.28	1,137	1,387	1,439	1,440	1,500	1,689
Social Democrats	Paul Mulville	8.78	1,076	1,158	1,310	1,323	1,618	1,991
Fianna Fáil	Adrian Henchy	7.38	905	936	968	971	1,011	
Sinn Féin	Patrick Roche	6.09	747	888	945	946		
Green	Suzanne Young	2.61	320	378				
Independent	Fergal O'Connell	2.22	272	287				
Independent	Aneta Laska	0.87	107	124				
Electorate: 26,494 Valid: 12,251 Spoilt: 157 (1.26%) Quota: 2,042 Turnout: 12,408 (46.83%)

=== Swords ===
Swords: 7 seats
Party	Candidate	FPv%	Count									
Party	Candidate	FPv%	1	2	3	4	5	6	7	8	9	10
Inds. 4 Change	Dean Mulligan	15.25	2,000									
Fianna Fáil	Darragh Butler	13.30	1,745									
Fine Gael	Luke Corkery	12.52	1,642									
Independent	Joe Newman	10.42	1,367	1,464	1,511	1,537	1,551	1,630	1,760			
Independent	Darren Jack Kelly	8.97	1,177	1,177	1,235	1,246	1,250	1,291	1,347	1,363	1,537	1,544
Fianna Fáil	Brigid Manton	6.81	893	918	922	932	985	995	1,133	1,147		
Labour	James Humphreys	6.73	883	909	913	929	943	1,002	1,325	1,362	1,677	
Sinn Féin	Marian Buckley†	6.72	881	912	915	1,043	1,046	1,136	1,184	1,191	1,255	1,259
Green	Ian Carey	6.46	848	875	880	884	897	962				
Sinn Féin	Ann Graves	6.42	842	878	883	997	1,000	1,057	1,138	1,150	1,245	1,247
People Before Profit	Ollie Power	3.16	414	465	477	489	490					
Sinn Féin	Conor Linnane	2.45	322	340	340							
Independent	Bernadette Wright	0.79	104	115								
Electorate: 34,071 Valid: 13,118 Spoilt: 218 Quota: 1,640 Turnout: 13,336 (39.14%)

== Changes ==
=== Co-options ===
Party	Outgoing	LEA	Reason	Date	Co-optee
Sinn Féin	Marian Buckley	Swords	Resigned on medical grounds	September 2024	Ann Graves
PBP–Solidarity	Ruth Coppinger	Castleknock	Elected to 34th Dáil at the 2024 general election	12 March 2025	Helen Redwood
Labour	Robert O'Donoghue	Rush–Lusk	Elected to 34th Dáil at the 2024 general election	18 December 2024	Kevin Humphreys
Sinn Féin	Ann Graves	Swords	Elected to 34th Dáil at the 2024 general election	18 December 2024	John Smyth
Labour	Kevin Humphreys	Rush–Lusk	Resignation	12 March 2025	Mark Boland
PBP–Solidarity	Helen Redwood	Castleknock	Health issues.	15 September 2026	Kate Relihan

=== Changes in affiliation ===
Name	LEA	Elected as	New affiliation	Date
Darren Jack Kelly	Swords	Independent	Aontú	26 February 2026
Dean Mulligan	Swords	Inds. 4 Change	Independent	10 March 2026
Patrick Quinlan	Blanchardstown–Mulhuddart	National Party	Independent	2 October 2026
