= 1999 Fingal County Council election =

Part of the 1999 Irish local elections

- 10 June 1999

All 24 seats to Fingal County Council
| | First party | Second party | Third party |
|---|---|---|---|
| Party | Fianna Fáil | Labour | Fine Gael |
| Seats won | 6 | 6 | 5 |
| Seat change | -2 | +1 | -1 |
| | Fourth party | Fifth party | Sixth party |
| Party | Socialist Party | Green | Progressive Democrats |
| Seats won | 2 | 1 | 1 |
| Seat change | +1 | -1 | - |
| | Seventh party |
| Party | Independent |
| Seats won | 3 |
| Seat change | +2 |
- Map showing the area of Fingal County Council
Council control after election
TBD

An election to Fingal County Council took place on 10 June 1999 as part of that year's Irish local elections. 24 councillors were elected from six local electoral areas on the system of proportional representation by means of the single transferable vote (PR-STV) for a five-year term of office.

== Results by party ==
| Party | Seats | ± | First Pref. votes | FPv% | ±% |
|---|---|---|---|---|---|
| Fianna Fáil | 6 | -2 | 12,993 | 27.21 | |
| Labour | 6 | +1 | 8,692 | 18.20 | |
| Fine Gael | 5 | -1 | 9,912 | 20.76 | |
| Socialist Party | 2 | +1 | 3,464 | 7.25 | |
| Green | 1 | -1 | 3,957 | 8.29 | |
| Progressive Democrats | 1 | - | 1,315 | 2.75 | |
| Independent | 3 | +2 | 6,153 | 12.89 | |
| Totals | 24 | - | 47,748 | 100.00 | — |

== Results by local electoral area ==
=== Balbriggan ===
Balbriggan - 4 seats
| Party | Candidate | FPv% | Count | | | | | | |
| Party | Candidate | FPv% | 1 | 2 | 3 | 4 | 5 | 6 | 7 |
|---|---|---|---|---|---|---|---|---|---|
| Independent | David O'Connor | 17.79 | 1,717 | 1,734 | 1,770 | 1,852 | 1,898 | 2,169 | |
| Fianna Fáil | Dermot Murray* | 11.83 | 1,142 | 1,152 | 1,287 | 1,473 | 1,526 | 1,700 | 1,725 |
| Fine Gael | Cathal Boland* | 11.52 | 1,112 | 1,161 | 1,251 | 1,329 | 1,907 | 2,143 | |
| Fianna Fáil | Catherine Clarke | 11.59 | 1,119 | 1,135 | 1,279 | 1,307 | 1,371 | 1,476 | 1,493 |
| Labour | Sean Sweeney | 10.33 | 997 | 1,071 | 1,089 | 1,346 | 1,439 | 1,654 | 1,759 |
| Fine Gael | Tom O'Leary | 9.41 | 908 | 963 | 1,076 | 1,103 | | | |
| Green | Therese Fingleton* | 9.12 | 880 | 942 | 973 | 1,106 | 1,228 | | |
| Labour | Monica Harford | 7.58 | 732 | 868 | 881 | | | | |
| Fianna Fáil | Briege Otto | 6.09 | 588 | 611 | | | | | |
| Independent | Bill Stack | 4.73 | 457 | | | | | | |
Electorate: 21,725 Valid: 9,652 (44.43%) Spoilt: 109 Quota: 1,931 Turnout: 9,761 (44.93%)

=== Castleknock ===
Castleknock - 4 seats
| Party | Candidate | FPv% | Count | | | | | | |
| Party | Candidate | FPv% | 1 | 2 | 3 | 4 | 5 | 6 | 7 |
|---|---|---|---|---|---|---|---|---|---|
| Independent | Sheila Terry* | 23.85 | 2,057 | | | | | | |
| Progressive Democrats | Tom Morrissey* | 14.13 | 1,218 | 1,266 | 1,303 | 1,329 | 1,445 | 1,601 | 1,801 |
| Labour | Joan Burton | 12.46 | 1,074 | 1,142 | 1,207 | 1,298 | 1,329 | 1,598 | 1,781 |
| Fianna Fáil | Des Kelly | 10.39 | 896 | 923 | 935 | 948 | 1,083 | 1,151 | |
| Fianna Fáil | Ned Ryan* | 10.37 | 894 | 935 | 945 | 960 | 1,091 | 1,159 | 1,637 |
| Independent | Seán Lyons* | 9.47 | 817 | 881 | 934 | 1,020 | 1,056 | 1,221 | 1,353 |
| Fine Gael | Jane Murphy | 8.37 | 722 | 763 | 775 | 784 | 801 | | |
| Fianna Fáil | Damien Mahon | 5.37 | 463 | 476 | 482 | 487 | | | |
| Socialist Party | Mick Cheevers | 2.93 | 253 | 259 | 294 | | | | |
| Green | Colm Murray | 2.66 | 229 | 253 | | | | | |
Electorate: 20,480 Valid: 8,623 (42.10%) Spoilt: 72 Quota: 1,725 Turnout: 8,695 (42.46%)

=== Howth ===
Howth - 3 seats
| Party | Candidate | FPv% | Count | | | |
| Party | Candidate | FPv% | 1 | 2 | 3 | 4 |
|---|---|---|---|---|---|---|
| Fine Gael | Joan Maher* | 31.36 | 2,182 | | | |
| Fine Gael | Michael Joe Cosgrave* | 21.99 | 1,530 | 1,756 | | |
| Fianna Fáil | Liam Creaven* | 14.07 | 979 | 1,026 | 1,077 | 1,765 |
| Green | David Healy* | 13.54 | 942 | 997 | 1,270 | 1,445 |
| Fianna Fáil | Aileen Woods | 12.01 | 836 | 909 | 1,004 | |
| Labour | Frank Barry | 7.03 | 489 | 530 | | |
Electorate: 17,956 Valid: 6,958 (38.75%) Spoilt: 79 Quota: 1,740 Turnout: 7,037 (39.19%)

=== Malahide ===
Malahide - 4 seats
| Party | Candidate | FPv% | Count | | | | |
| Party | Candidate | FPv% | 1 | 2 | 3 | 4 | 5 |
|---|---|---|---|---|---|---|---|
| Labour | Peter Coyle* | 21.29 | 1,714 | | | | |
| Fianna Fáil | G.V. Wright* | 19.16 | 1,542 | 1,552 | 1,566 | 1,604 | 1,788 |
| Green | Heidi Bedell | 14.88 | 1,198 | 1,236 | 1,329 | 1,418 | 1,596 |
| Fine Gael | Seán Dolphin | 13.45 | 1,083 | 1,098 | 1,113 | 1,147 | 1,711 |
| Fianna Fáil | Graham Hanlon | 13.42 | 1,080 | 1,091 | 1,114 | 1,144 | 1,184 |
| Fine Gael | Nora Owen | 12.09 | 973 | 991 | 1,004 | 1,033 | |
| Christian Solidarity | Angela Keaveney | 3.02 | 243 | 249 | 264 | | |
| Socialist Party | Eamonn McNally | 2.70 | 217 | 222 | | | |
Electorate: 20,222 Valid: 8,050 (39.81%) Spoilt: 50 Quota: 1,611 Turnout: 8,100 (40.06%)

=== Mulhuddart ===
Mulhuddart - 4 seats
| Party | Candidate | FPv% | Count | | | | | | | | | |
| Party | Candidate | FPv% | 1 | 2 | 3 | 4 | 5 | 6 | 7 | 8 | 9 | 10 |
|---|---|---|---|---|---|---|---|---|---|---|---|---|
| Socialist Party | Joe Higgins* | 25.95 | 1,392 | | | | | | | | | |
| Sinn Féin | Paul Donnelly | 12.58 | 675 | 709 | 709 | 710 | 721 | 733 | 744 | 852 | 876 | 903 |
| Labour | Michael O'Donovan* | 11.24 | 603 | 642 | 646 | 660 | 672 | 714 | 725 | 805 | 857 | 1,054 |
| Independent | Gerry Lynam | 10.20 | 547 | 584 | 590 | 602 | 616 | 656 | 704 | 792 | 846 | 976 |
| Fianna Fáil | Margaret Richardson* | 8.44 | 453 | 466 | 468 | 473 | 479 | 503 | 575 | 596 | 854 | 929 |
| Fine Gael | Leo Varadkar | 7.08 | 380 | 401 | 401 | 424 | 443 | 484 | 495 | 529 | 580 | |
| Fianna Fáil | Colm Heery | 5.87 | 315 | 327 | 330 | 346 | 352 | 364 | 495 | 512 | | |
| Socialist Party | Karen Allen | 5.87 | 315 | 424 | 428 | 430 | 447 | 463 | 464 | | | |
| Fianna Fáil | Miley Caldwell | 5.18 | 278 | 288 | 289 | 295 | 298 | 310 | | | | |
| Independent | Seán Lyons* | 3.28 | 176 | 197 | 201 | 209 | 227 | | | | | |
| Green | Robert Bonnie | 1.90 | 102 | 116 | 126 | 132 | | | | | | |
| Progressive Democrats | Michael McClure | 1.81 | 97 | 99 | 99 | | | | | | | |
| Independent | Frank Clarke | 0.60 | 32 | 38 | | | | | | | | |
Electorate: 18,257 Valid: 5,365 (29.39%) Spoilt: 61 Quota: 1,074 Turnout: 5,426 (29.72%)

=== Swords ===
Swords - 5 seats
| Party | Candidate | FPv% | Count | | | | | | | |
| Party | Candidate | FPv% | 1 | 2 | 3 | 4 | 5 | 6 | 7 | 8 |
|---|---|---|---|---|---|---|---|---|---|---|
| Labour | Seán Ryan* | 26.29 | 2,392 | | | | | | | |
| Fianna Fáil | Michael Kennedy* | 15.27 | 1,390 | 1,480 | 1,500 | 1,536 | | | | |
| Socialist Party | Clare Daly | 14.14 | 1,287 | 1,387 | 1,403 | 1,434 | 1,546 | | | |
| Fine Gael | Anne Devitt* | 8.44 | 768 | 850 | 982 | 1,014 | 1,047 | 1,114 | 1,118 | 1,266 |
| Labour | Tom Kelleher* | 7.59 | 691 | 1,025 | 1,047 | 1,074 | 1,143 | 1,190 | 1,203 | 1,485 |
| Green | Paul Martin | 6.66 | 606 | 699 | 735 | 784 | 863 | 933 | 941 | |
| Fianna Fáil | Martina Coombes | 6.54 | 595 | 626 | 632 | 662 | 698 | 978 | 982 | 1,105 |
| Fianna Fáil | Anne Marie Woods | 4.65 | 423 | 487 | 502 | 580 | 614 | | | |
| Independent | Joe O'Neill | 3.85 | 350 | 379 | 385 | 429 | | | | |
| Christian Solidarity | Michael Scahill | 3.78 | 344 | 369 | 376 | | | | | |
| Fine Gael | Declan McEvoy | 2.79 | 254 | 281 | | | | | | |
Electorate: 25,970 Valid: 9,100 (35.04%) Spoilt: 82 Quota: 1,517 Turnout: 9,182 (35.36%)
