= 2019 Fingal County Council election =

Part of the 2019 Irish local elections

- 24 May 2019

All 40 seats on Fingal County Council 21 seats needed for a majority
	First party	Second party	Third party
Party	Fianna Fáil	Fine Gael	Labour
Seats won	8	7	6
Seat change	▲1	▲1	▲2
	Fourth party	Fifth party	Sixth party
Party	Green	Sinn Féin	Social Democrats
Seats won	5	4	2
Seat change	▲3	▼2	▲2
	Seventh party	Eighth party	Ninth party
Party	Solidarity	Inds. 4 Change	Independent
Seats won	1	1	6
Seat change	▼3	▲1	▼4
- Results by Local Electoral Area
Council control before election
Fianna Fáil
Council control after election
Fianna Fáil
Labour Party
Green Party
Independent

An election to all 40 seats on Fingal County Council was held on 24 May 2019 as part of 2019 Irish local elections. Fingal was divided into 7 local electoral areas (LEAs) to elect councillors for a five-year term of office on the electoral system of proportional representation by means of the single transferable vote (PR-STV).

== Boundary changes ==
Following a recommendation of the 2018 Boundary Committee, the boundaries of the LEAs were altered from those used in the 2014 elections. Its terms of reference required no change in the total number of councillors but set a lower maximum LEA size of seven councillors, breached by four of Fingal's five 2014 LEAs. Other changes were necessitated by population shifts revealed by the 2016 census.

== Overview ==
Fianna Fáil emerged as the largest party with 8 seats a net gain of 1 seat. The party won 2 seats in each of Swords and Rush–Lusk. Following boundary changes with Brian Dennehy having transferred to Rush–Lusk, the party emerged seatless in Balbriggan, however. Fine Gael also increased their seat numbers by 1 to 7 but failed to win a seat in Swords for another election as well as Rush–Lusk. Labour gained 2 seats to return with 6 seats in total. The Green Party gained 3 seats in Balbriggan, Ongar and Swords to increase their numbers to 5. Cian O'Callaghan and Paul Mulville had joined the Social Democrats in the years pre-election and both retained their seats. Sinn Féin lost 2 seats overall in Balbriggan and in Howth-Malahide. The party fared much better in the LEAs that make up the Dublin West constituency than Dubin Fingal and just took the last seat in Swords. Solidarity had a very poor election in a former heartland returning with just 1 seat.

Punam Rane, elected for Fine Gael in Blanchardstown–Mulhuddart, became Ireland's first Indian-born councillor. The Green gains included a 20-year-old student, Daniel Whooley, elected in Ongar.

== Results by party ==
Party	Seats	±	1st pref	FPv%	±%
Fianna Fáil	8	▲1	13,677	17.25	▼0.67
Fine Gael	7	▲1	13,418	16.93	▲2.24
Labour	6	▲2	10,449	13.18	▲1.87
Green	5	▲3	11,154	14.07	▲8.96
Sinn Féin	4	▼2	7,202	9.08	▼5.51
Social Democrats	2	▲2	4,683	5.91	New
Solidarity	1	▼3	2,891	3.65	▼4.36
Inds. 4 Change	1	▲1	1,304	1.64	New
Aontú	0	Steady	1,743	2.20	New
People Before Profit	0	▼1	263	0.33	▼1.47
Independent	6	▼4	12,474	15.73	▼9.69
Total	40	Steady	79,278	100.00	

== Results by local electoral area ==
*: Outgoing councillor elected in 2014.
†: Outgoing councillor coopted subsequent to the 2014 election.

=== Balbriggan ===
Balbriggan: 5 seats
Party	Candidate	FPv%	Count								
Party	Candidate	FPv%	1	2	3	4	5	6	7	8	9
Independent	Tony Murphy	17.74%	1,881								
Green	Joe O'Brien (Note: See change below.)	14.64%	1,552	1,560	1,587	1,612	1,679	1,717	1,792		
Labour	Seána Ó Rodaigh	12.28%	1,302	1,307	1,314	1,325	1,358	1,382	1,431	1,538	1,687
Fine Gael	Tom O'Leary	11.46%	1,215	1,219	1,224	1,256	1,261	1,272	1,308	1,324	1,609
Independent	Gráinne Maguire	10.95%	1,161	1,206	1,272	1,289	1,346	1,391	1,502	1,646	1,825
Sinn Féin	Malachy Quinn	9.30%	986	998	1,048	1,055	1,082	1,109	1,141	1,246	1,287
Fine Gael	Sam O'Connor	5.90%	626	637	647	700	720	748	828	876	
Fianna Fáil	Niall Keady	4.00%	424	432	444	453	461	487			
Solidarity	Carah Daniel	3.88%	411	415	435	449	490	573	600		
Social Democrats	Garrett Mullan	2.75%	292	297	309	320					
People Before Profit	Oghenetano John Uwhumiakpor	2.48%	263	265	271	340	359				
Fine Gael	Okezie Emuaga	2.39%	253	255	264						
Independent	Martin Hughes	2.24%	237	244							
Electorate: 23,553 Valid: 10,603 Spoilt: 218 Quota: 1,768 Turnout: 10,821 (45.94%)

=== Blanchardstown–Mulhuddart ===
Blanchardstown–Mulhuddart: 5 seats
Party	Candidate	FPv%	Count							
Party	Candidate	FPv%	1	2	3	4	5	6	7	8
Labour	Mary McCamley	17.81%	888							
Sinn Féin	Breda Hanaphy	12.24%	610	614	619	679	716	739	1,041	
Fine Gael	Punam Rane	11.07%	552	569	582	603	637	762	793	806
Solidarity	John Burtchaell	10.75%	536	541	546	601	652	677	732	818
Fianna Fáil	Freddie Cooper	10.07%	502	508	511	526	554	647	667	685
Independent	Robert Loughlin	8.91%	444	445	455	478	538	551	563	595
Sinn Féin	Damien Bissett	8.37%	417	421	428	450	471	484		
Fianna Fáil	JK Onwumereh	6.88%	343	350	356	370	399			
Aontú	Sinéad Moore	6.14%	306	311	319	363				
Independent	Lorna Nolan	5.98%	298	304	319					
Independent	Marius Marosan	0.96%	48	49						
Independent	Aran Smeallie	0.82%	41	42						
Electorate: 17,132 Valid: 4,985 Spoilt: 201 Quota: 831 Turnout: 5,186 (30.27%)

=== Castleknock ===
Castleknock: 6 seats
Party	Candidate	FPv%	Count							
Party	Candidate	FPv%	1	2	3	4	5	6	7	8
Green	Roderic O'Gorman	27.25%	3,731							
Fine Gael	Emer Currie	15.99%	2,189							
Fine Gael	Ted Leddy	11.29%	1,546	1,928	2,082					
Fianna Fáil	Howard Mahony	11.01%	1,507	1,621	1,638	1,661	1,678	2,117		
Labour	John Walsh	9.03%	1,237	1,944	1,970					
Aontú	Edward MacManus	6.64%	909	1,008	1,016	1,027	1,091	1,143	1,180	1,351
Sinn Féin	Natalie Treacy	6.36%	871	948	950	950	1,156	1,192	1,200	1,654
Solidarity	Sandra Kavanagh	5.25%	719	941	948	952	1,028	1,061	1,080	
Fianna Fáil	Mags Murray	4.23%	579	671	684	710	728			
Sinn Féin	Ryan Fitzgerald	1.92%	263	303	306	309				
Independent	Kevin Mullally	1.04%	142	183	185	187				
Electorate: 32,220 Valid: 13,693 Spoilt: 274 Quota: 1,957 Turnout: 13,967 (43.35%)

=== Howth–Malahide ===
Howth–Malahide: 7 seats
Party	Candidate	FPv%	Count		
Party	Candidate	FPv%	1	2	3
Fianna Fáil	Eoghan O'Brien	18.06%	3,561		
Green	David Healy	17.35%	3,422		
Social Democrats	Cian O'Callaghan	13.78%	2,717		
Labour	Brian McDonagh	13.03%	2,569		
Independent	Jimmy Guerin	11.34%	2,237	2,586	
Fine Gael	Aoibhinn Tormey	10.46%	2,064	2,325	2,725
Fine Gael	Anthony Lavin	9.55%	1,883	2,233	2,441
Sinn Féin	Daire Ní Laoi	4.90%	966	1,041	1,210
Independent	Tom Daly	1.54%	304	364	543
Electorate: 43,919 Valid: 19,723 Spoilt: 656 Quota: 2,466 Turnout: 20,379 (46.40%)

=== Ongar ===
Ongar: 5 seats
Party	Candidate	FPv%	Count								
Party	Candidate	FPv%	1	2	3	4	5	6	7	8	9
Sinn Féin	Paul Donnelly	21.22%	1,594								
Independent	Tania Doyle	15.00%	1,127	1,169	1,197	1,218	1,271				
Fianna Fáil	Tom Kitt	11.57%	869	894	905	917	947	949	991	1,048	1,144
Fine Gael	Kieran Dennison	8.93%	671	682	701	709	737	737	895	991	1,111
Solidarity	Matt Waine	8.87%	666	694	713	762	850	855	877	908	1,029
Green	Daniel Whooley	8.79%	660	677	695	798	827	828	857	977	1,116
Aontú	Gerard Sheehan	7.03%	528	537	552	576	599	606	647	698	
Labour	Elaine Carmel Dooley	4.61%	346	360	370	403	434	436	479		
Fine Gael	Jagan Muttumula	4.49%	337	343	400	417	426	428			
Social Democrats	Aengus Ó Maoláin	4.03%	303	312	318						
Sinn Féin	Marian Buckley	2.54%	191	370	376	391					
Independent	Ramesh Racherla	2.48%	186	188							
Independent	Raghu Nath Narayanam	0.44%	33	33							
Electorate: 20,665 Valid: 7,511 Spoilt: 195 Quota: 1,252 Turnout: 7,766 (37.58%)

=== Rush–Lusk ===
Rush–Lusk: 5 seats
Party	Candidate	FPv%	Count									
Party	Candidate	FPv%	1	2	3	4	5	6	7	8	9	10
Labour	Robert O'Donoghue	18.65%	1,982									
Fianna Fáil	Adrian Henchy	13.09%	1,391	1,397	1,411	1,428	1,441	1,451	1,474	1,498	1,653	1,748
Fianna Fáil	Brian Dennehy	11.73%	1,247	1,279	1,288	1,313	1,373	1,422	1,460	1,495	1,534	1,658
Independent	Cathal Boland	8.92%	948	963	999	1,036	1,074	1,142	1,211	1,292	1,320	1,628
Social Democrats	Paul Mulville	8.19%	871	883	894	923	936	998	1,085	1,270	1,362	1,435
Fine Gael	Jim Monks	7.21%	766	787	808	814	830	841	868	908	1,095	
Labour	Corina Johnston	7.03%	747	794	806	832	843	879	909	1,046	1,195	1,303
Fine Gael	Bob Dowling	6.12%	651	659	670	685	692	706	712	748		
Green	Maria Salahovs	4.77%	507	527	534	548	583	630	712			
Sinn Féin	Noeleen O'Hagan	4.16%	442	453	459	468	485	515				
Independent	Roslyn Fuller	3.04%	323	336	348	381	438					
Independent	Sandra Sweetman	2.72%	289	306	320	347						
Independent	Glenn Brady	2.23%	237	243	274							
Independent	Davin Browne	1.19%	126	127								
Independent	Eóin Corcoran	0.97%	103	104								
Electorate: 23,611 Valid: 10,630 Spoilt: 296 Quota: 1,772 Turnout: 10,926 (46.28%)

=== Swords ===
Swords: 7 seats
Party	Candidate	FPv%	Count													
Party	Candidate	FPv%	1	2	3	4	5	6	7	8	9	10	11	12	13	14
Fianna Fáil	Darragh Butler	18.94%	2,298													
Inds. 4 Change	Dean Mulligan	10.75%	1,304	1,338	1,342	1,352	1,393	1,434	1,490	1,553						
Green	Ian Carey	10.57%	1,282	1,363	1,363	1,383	1,393	1,408	1,516	1,695						
Labour	Duncan Smith	9.83%	1,193	1,259	1,260	1,339	1,347	1,375	1,406	1,461	1,494	1,497	1,576			
Independent	Joe Newman	8.94%	1,085	1,163	1,171	1,175	1,213	1,222	1,263	1,292	1,305	1,312	1,456	1,477	1,662	
Fianna Fáil	Brigid Manton	7.88%	956	1,231	1,232	1,243	1,254	1,273	1,326	1,359	1,372	1,375	1,439	1,449	1,509	1,521
Fine Gael	Helen Dunne	5.65%	685	740	743	751	755	760	804	854	864	867	911	923	982	994
Solidarity	Eugene Coppinger	4.61%	559	588	592	595	608	621	670	740	776	788	841	849		
Independent	Paul Uzo	4.18%	507	551	555	560	570	589	628	645	656	661				
Social Democrats	Tracey Carey	4.12%	500	531	534	551	558	561	598							
Independent	Duane Michael Browne	3.96%	481	518	524	534	553	561								
Sinn Féin	Ann Graves	3.91%	475	488	490	499	513	733	758	790	801	804	852	853	1,046	1,080
Sinn Féin	Lorraine O'Connell	3.19%	387	396	401	407	409									
Labour	Yulia Ghumman	1.52%	185	199	199											
Independent	James Fitzpatrick	1.52%	184	198	202	205										
Independent	Fergal O'Connell	0.43%	52	53												
Electorate: 31,854 Valid: 12,133 Spoilt: 431 Quota: 1,517 Turnout: 12,564 (39.44%)

== Results by gender ==
2019 Fingal County Council election Candidates by gender
Gender	Number of candidates	% of candidates	Elected councillors	% of councillors
Men	61	68.5%	29	72.5%
Women	28	31.5%	11	27.5%
TOTAL	89		40	

== Changes after 2019 ==
Party	Outgoing	LEA	Reason	Date	Co-optee
Green	Joe O'Brien	Balbriggan	Elected to the 32nd Dáil for Dublin Fingal at the 2019 by-election	25 January 2020	Karen Power
Green	Roderic O'Gorman	Castleknock	Elected to the 33rd Dáil for Dublin West at the 2020 general election	25 February 2020	Pamela Conroy
Social Democrats	Cian O'Callaghan	Howth–Malahide	Elected to the 33rd Dáil for Dublin Bay North at the 2020 general election	25 February 2020	Joan Hopkins
Sinn Féin	Paul Donnelly	Ongar	Elected to the 33rd Dáil for Dublin West at the 2020 general election	25 February 2020	Aaron O'Rourke
Labour	Duncan Smith	Swords	Elected to the 33rd Dáil for Dublin Fingal at the 2020 general election	25 February 2020	James Humphreys
Fine Gael	Emer Currie	Castleknock	Nominated by the Taoiseach to the 26th Seanad on 27 June 2020	June 2020	Siobhan Shovlin
Fianna Fáil	Freddie Cooper	Blanchardstown–Mulhuddart	Death on 29 June 2021	11 October 2021	John-Kingsley Onwumereh
Sinn Féin	Aaron O'Rourke	Ongar	Resignation	16 March 2022	Angela Donnelly
Labour	Seána Ó Rodaigh	Balbriggan	Resignation	12 June 2023	Brendan Ryan
Green	Daniel Whooley	Ongar	Resignation	23 January 2024	Michelle Griffin
Fine Gael	Punam Rane	Blanchardstown–Mulhuddart	Resignation	February 2024	Steve O'Reilly

== Sources ==
- "Fingal County Council - Local Election candidates". RTÉ. 13 May 2019. Archived from the original on 6 June 2021.
- "Local Elections 2019 - The Count". Fingal County Council. Archived from the original on 1 August 2019.
- "Local Elections 2019: Results, Transfer of Votes and Statistics" (PDF). Government of Ireland. Department of Housing, Planning and Local Government (DHPLG). pp. 104–111.
