= 1998 Dublin North by-election =

By-election to the 28th Dáil

- 11 March 1998
- Turnout: 33,046 (50.2%)
	Ryan	Kennedy	Jenkinson
Nominee	Seán Ryan	Michael Kennedy	Philip Jenkinson
Party	Labour	Fianna Fáil	Fine Gael
First preferences	11,012	10,334	3,185
Percentage	33.3%	31.3%	9.6%
Final count	16,896	13,633	–
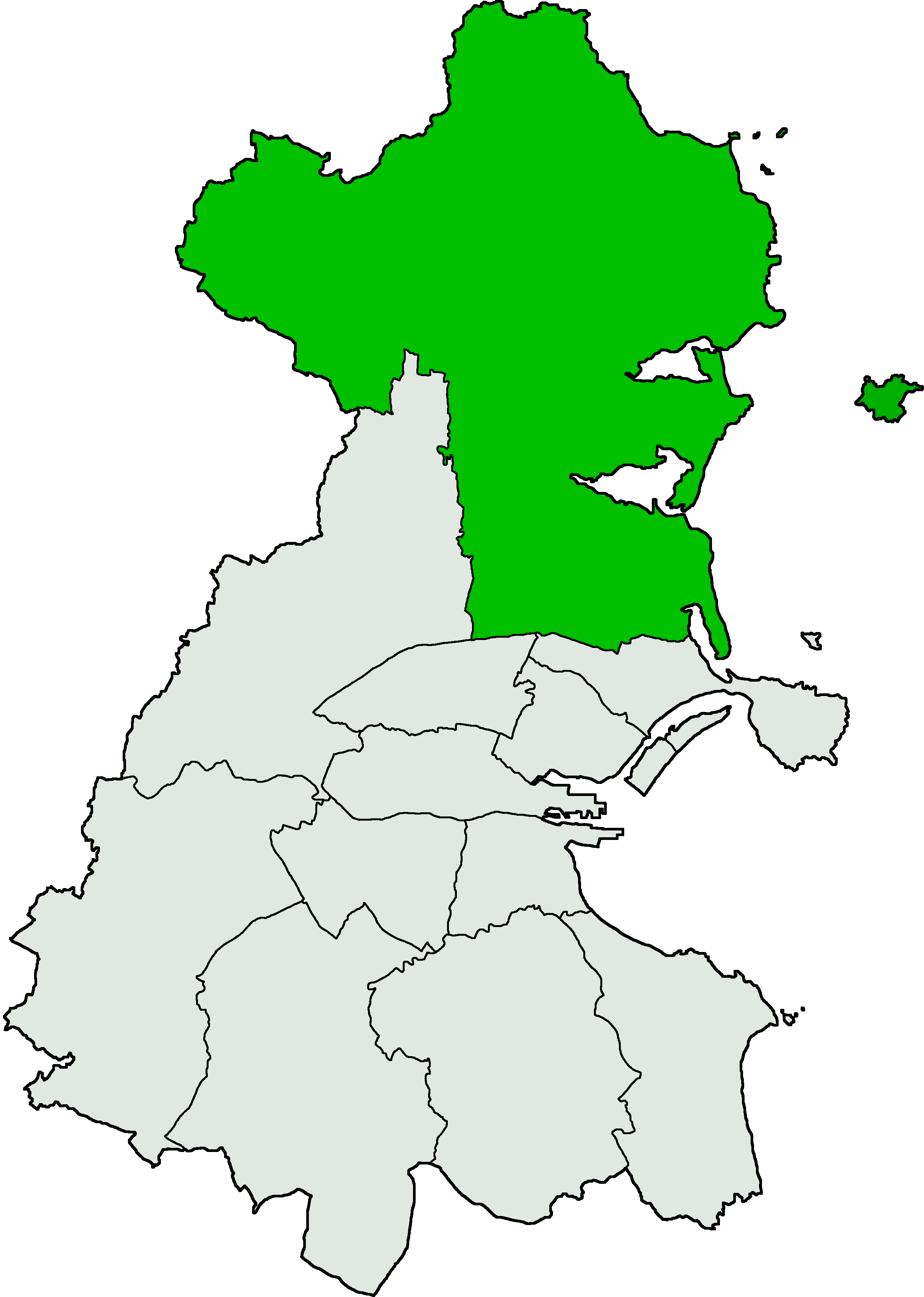
- Dublin North shown within County Dublin
TD before election
Ray Burke
Fianna Fáil
TD after election
Seán Ryan
Labour

A Dáil by-election was held in the constituency of Dublin North in Ireland on Wednesday, 11 March 1998, to fill a vacancy in the 28th Dáil. It followed the resignation of Fianna Fáil Teachta Dála (TD) Ray Burke on 7 October 1997.

The by-election was won by the Labour candidate Senator Seán Ryan.

19 candidates contested the by-election, including 9 independents. The winner was declared after 14 counts, with eight candidates getting less than 1% of the first preference vote. On the same day, a by-election took place in Limerick East; both were the final occasions in which Democratic Left contested by-elections. Both by-elections were won by Labour candidates.

== Background ==
Ray Burke, a Fianna Fáíl TD for Dublin North, was appointed as Minister for Foreign Affairs following the 1997 general election; however, allegations resurfaced that Burke had received IR£80,000 from a property developer. While denying the allegations, Burke resigned both as a minister and as a TD on 7 October 1997. A 1998 article in the Irish Independent noted that Burke's brother had died a week before his resignation, describing it as a "time of deep-seated grief" for him. The writ of election was moved on 17 February 1998.

== Candidate selection ==
=== Democratic Left ===
This by-election was the first and only time Democratic Left ran a candidate in this constituency. Their candidate, language school co-owner Joe Holohan, had contested the constituency at the 1981 general election for the Labour Party, but later became a founding member of Democratic Left.

=== Fianna Fáil ===
Initial reports suggested that Fianna Fáil were struggling to find a candidate to defend the seat. Candidates who declined to seek the nomination included Graham Turley, the widower of murdered crime reporter Veronica Guerin, and former Dublin GAA goalkeeper John O'Leary. Other speculated candidates included Eimear Mulhearn, daughter of former Taoiseach Charles Haughey, and Amy Ahern, niece of Taoiseach Bertie Ahern. On 15 December 1997, county councillor Michael Kennedy won the party's nomination, defeating nurse Catherine Clarke and barrister Eoin Martin.

=== Fine Gael ===
Five candidates sought the Fine Gael nomination; Lusk-based county councillor Philip Jenkinson, vice chairman of Young Fine Gael Sean Dolphin, businessman Michael Brannigan, Niall Atkins and Steve McCullough. On 11 December, the party announced Jenkinson as their selected candidate for the by-election.

=== Green Party ===
The Green Party, who had held their seat in this constituency narrowly at the last general election, nominated healthcare worker Paul Martin from Portrane.

=== Labour Party ===
The Labour Party nominated Senator Seán Ryan, a former TD for the constituency who had lost his seat at the 1997 general election. After losing his seat, Ryan ran for a seat in the Seanad and was elected.

=== Progressive Democrats ===
Finian Fallon, who unsuccessfully contested the constituency at the 1997 general election for the Progressive Democrats, was the party's nominee at this election. The son of murdered garda Richard Fallon, Fallon rejected calls for a voting pact between the Progressive Democrats and Fianna Fáil. His director for the election was former Fianna Fáil minister Martin O'Donoghue.

=== Sinn Féin ===
Paul Donnelly contested this election for Sinn Féin.

=== Socialist Party ===
On 30 October 1997, the Socialist Party selected Clare Daly to be their candidate in the by-election. 29-year-old Daly had unsuccessfully contested the constituency at the 1997 general election, receiving 3000 votes. She had previously been president of Dublin City University Students' Union and a coordinator in the anti-water charge movement in Dublin North.

=== Independents and others ===
Gertie Shields, founder of Mothers Against Drink Driving and independent member of Balbriggan Town Commission, declared that she would contest the election in December 1997. Single-issue candidate Elaine Rooney from Portrane ran as an independent against the Eastern Health Board's planned special care unit at St. Ita's Hospital, while another, Rena Condrot Ruigrok, ran in support of the closure of Balleally dump. Other candidates from inside the constituency included Angela Keaveney from Portmarnock for the Christian Solidarity Party, independent Ciaran Goulding from Lusk, and independent Alan Nagle from Portmarnock.

A number of other candidates from outside the constituency's boundaries sought election; Noel O'Neill from Drogheda ran for the Natural Law Party, while independents Benny Cooney from Athlone, Peter Farrelly from Drogheda, independent Unionist John McDonald from Newtownabbey, Northern Ireland and perennial candidate Jim Tallon from Arklow also ran.

== Campaign ==
Early reports suggested that Fianna Fáil anticipated a difficult election campaign, with Taoiseach Bertie Ahern admitting the party faced an "uphill battle" to keep the Dublin North seat. Combined with the by-election in Limerick East held on the same day, this put the government at risk of a one-seat majority if they lost both, a particular concern given the government relied on three independent TDs supporting them.

During the campaign, Socialist Party candidate Clare Daly applied for an injunction withdrawing the Fingal Independent newspaper from sale, alleging that the paper had published claims to damage her chances of being elected. The paper had published a claim that Daly called for her transfers to be given to Seán Ryan, a statement Daly denied making.

A major issue that impacted the campaign was the dump at Balleally, due to be closed the previous November until the local council vowed instead to expand it. In November 1997, 400 people had marched through Dublin city calling for the dump in Balleally to be closed, and threatened to run their own independent candidate in the election, later opting to run Rena Condrot Ruigrok as this candidate. Other campaign issues included traffic issues around Swords and Dublin Airport, a trade dispute involving Ryanair employees, school funding in the constituency, and a threatened abolition of duty-free sales at Dublin Airport placing 300 Aer Rianta employees at risk of redundancy.

=== Predictions and polls ===
The Labour Party candidate Seán Ryan was initially viewed as the favourite, particularly due to name recognition, with bookmaker Paddy Power giving odds on 2 March of 1/2 for Ryan, and 11/8 for Michael Kennedy of Fianna Fáil. By 9 March, these odds had shifted to 1/5 for Ryan, 11/4 for Kennedy and 40/1 for Jenkinson.

Two days prior to the election, Brian Dowling of the Irish Independent predicted Ryan to win the seat, though for it to go "down to the wire".

Last date of polling	Polling firm / Commissioner	Sample size	Kennedy (FF)	Ryan (Lab)	Jenkinson (FG)	Daly (SP)	Martin (GP)	Donnelly (SF)	Goulding (Ind)	Shields (Ind)	Rooney (Ind)	Fallon (PD)	Undecided	O/I
March 1988	Sunday Independent/IMS	400	29%	31%	17%	7%	6%	5%	2%	0.75%	0.75%	0.75%		2% (Note: Keaveney and Farrelly with 0.5%, Tallon, Nagle, Cooney and Holohan with 0.25%, Condrot, McDonald and O'Neill with 0%.)
26 February 1988	MRC	Unknown	21%	16%	6%	5%							46%	6% (Note: 6% "others")

== Result ==
Ryan topped the poll on the first count and was elected on the fourteenth count, following the redistribution of Philip Jenkinson's votes. The Labour Party won both by-elections held on this day.

1998 Dublin North by-election
Party	Candidate	FPv%	Count													
Party	Candidate	FPv%	1	2	3	4	5	6	7	8	9	10	11	12	13	14
Labour	Seán Ryan	33.3	11,012	11,012	11,017	11,029	11,057	11,216	11,397	11,475	11,555	11,717	12,049	12,832	14,320	16,896
Fianna Fáil	Michael Kennedy	31.3	10,334	10,335	10,336	10,352	10,365	10,421	10,514	10,744	10,936	11,079	11,236	11,983	12,698	13,633
Fine Gael	Philip Jenkinson	9.6	3,185	3,186	3,187	3,190	3,215	3,258	3,296	3,385	3,449	3,557	3,715	3,982	4,395	
Socialist Party	Clare Daly	8.2	2,692	2,692	2,694	2,702	2,705	2,746	2,777	2,809	2,848	2,948	3,041	3,553		
Green	Paul Martin	3.3	1,092	1,092	1,093	1,103	1,108	1,151	1,185	1,236	1,289	1,414	1,511			
Sinn Féin	Paul Donnelly	3.3	1,088	1,088	1,088	1,092	1,093	1,108	1,115	1,119	1,150	1,188	1,209			
Independent	Rena Condrot Ruigrok	2.4	780	781	781	786	790	798	809	821	850	929				
Independent	Ciaran Goulding	2.1	682	682	683	690	698	714	740	763	817					
Christian Solidarity	Angela Keaveney	1.7	565	565	566	573	576	582	598	616						
Progressive Democrats	Finian Fallon	1.6	533	533	533	540	550	557	565							
Independent	Gertie Shields	1.4	452	458	460	464	467	476								
Democratic Left	Joe Holohan	0.7	225	225	225	229	232									
Independent	Elaine Rooney	0.5	176	177	178	179	183									
Independent	John McDonald	0.3	107	107	107	112										
Independent	Alan Nagle	0.1	44	44	45											
Independent	Peter Farrelly	0.1	34	34	34											
Independent	Benny Cooney	0.1	18	18	18											
Natural Law	Noel O'Neill	0.1	15	16												
Independent	Jim Tallon	0.1	12													
Electorate: 65,891 Valid: 33,046 Quota: 16,524 Turnout: 50.2%

=== Reactions ===
The election was seen as a blow for Fianna Fáil and a disappointing one for Fine Gael, the Green Party and Democratic Left, though a positive election for the Socialist Party and Sinn Féin.

Ryan described the result as "vindication of my work over the years in the constituency". Fianna Fáil's director for the by-election, Dermot Ahern (no relation to partie leader Bertie), attributed the party's defeat to several factors including Fianna Fáil's status as a government party and the fragmentation of votes due to the number of candidates, denying that it was a swing away from the party. After a disappointing result, Fine Gael deputy leader and TD for Dublin North Nora Owen commented that the party "were battling against the odds from day one".

== Later careers ==
Seán Ryan remained a TD until the 2007 general election, when he retired. His brother Brendan attempted to retain his seat for the Labour Party, but was unsuccessful, though he later served as a TD from 2011 until 2020.

Michael Kennedy would go on to serve as a TD for the constituency from 2007 to 2011. Clare Daly would go on to serve as a TD for this constituency from 2011 until 2016, then for its successor constituency Dublin Fingal from 2016 until her election as an MEP, serving in that role from 2019 until 2024. Paul Donnelly was elected as a TD in 2020 in Dublin West, and was re-elected in 2024.
