= County Hall, Swords =

Municipal building in Fingal, Ireland

- Halla an Chontae, Sord Cholmcille
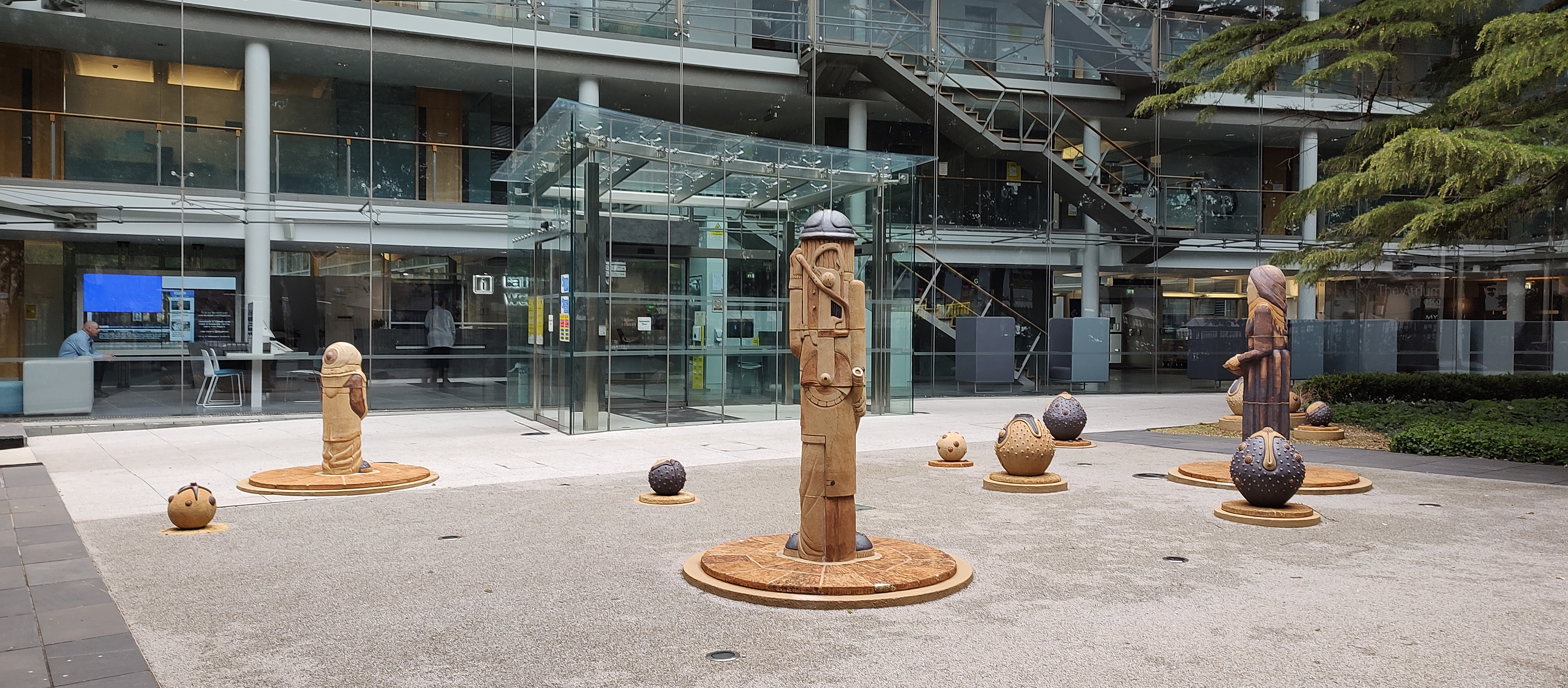
- County Hall entrance and sculptures

- Location within Ireland

General information
- Location: Main Street, Swords, Ireland
- Coordinates: 53.4590°N 6.2192°W
- Completed: 2000

Design and construction
- Architects: Bucholz & McEvoy

County Hall (Irish: Halla an Chontae, Sord Cholmcille) is a municipal building in Swords in the county of Fingal, Ireland.

== History ==
Following the implementation of the Local Government (Dublin) Act 1993, which created Fingal County Council, the county council initially met at the former offices of the abolished Dublin County Council, an office block at 46-49 O'Connell Street, Dublin. The new building, which was designed by Bucholz & McEvoy in association with the Building Design Partnership, was purpose-built for the county council and completed in 2000. It has full-length glass wall engineered by RFR, a French firm who also carried out the engineering for the Louvre Pyramid. There is a 150-year-old Himalayan cedar tree growing in the centre of the building.
