= Kevin Humphreys (politician) =

Irish former politician (born 1958)

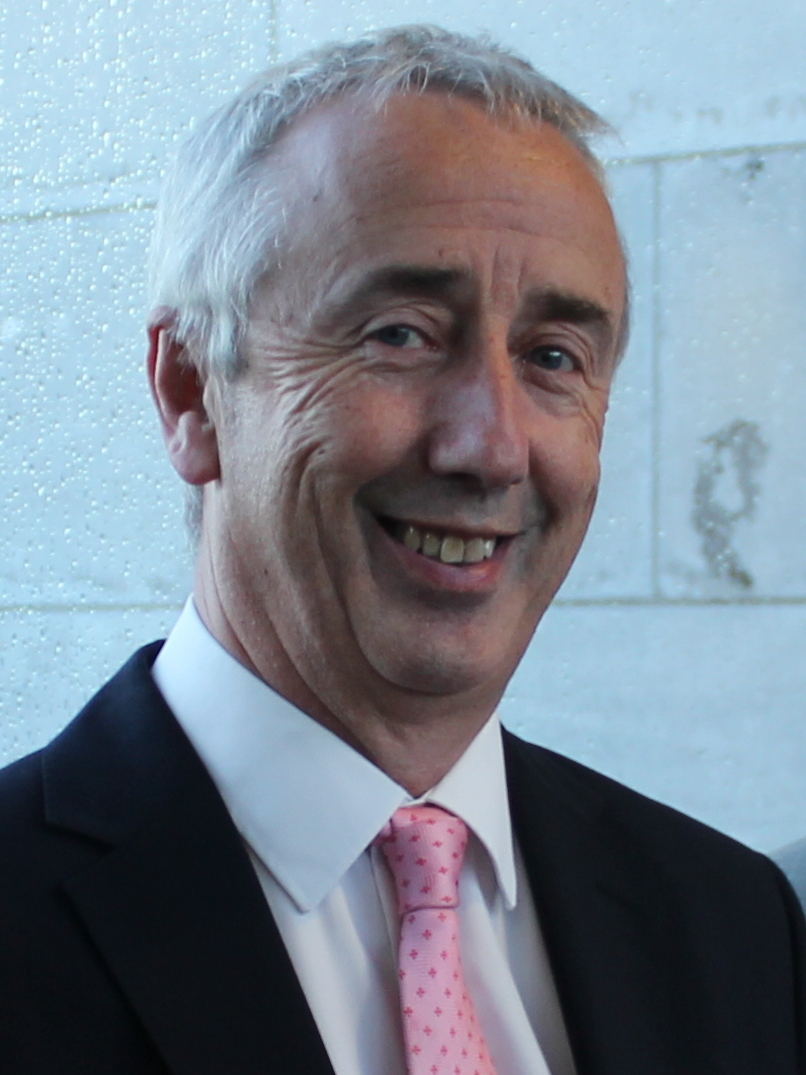
- Humphreys in 2014

Fingal County Councillor
- In office 18 December 2024 – 12 March 2025
- Constituency: Rush–Lusk

Senator
- In office 8 June 2016 – 29 June 2020
- Constituency: Administrative Panel

Minister of State
- 2014–2016: Social Protection

Teachta Dála
- In office February 2011 – February 2016
- Constituency: Dublin South-East

Personal details
- Born: 4 February 1958 (age 68) Ringsend, Dublin, Ireland
- Party: Labour Party
- Spouse: Catherine Humphreys
- Education: Dublin Institute of Technology

Kevin Humphreys (born 4 February 1958) is an Irish former Labour Party politician who served as a Minister of State from 2014 to 2016. He served as a Teachta Dála (TD) for Dublin South-East from 2011 to 2016 and as a Senator for the Administrative Panel from 2016 to 2020. He briefly served on Fingal County Council from 2024 to 2025.

Humphreys is from Ringsend. He was first politically active in the campaign against the Eighth Amendment in 1983, which gave constitutional recognition to the right to life of the unborn.

Humphreys first ran for election at the 1999 local elections, when he was elected as a member of Dublin City Council, representing the South East Inner City local electoral area. He represented the area until his election to the Dáil in 2011. He was re-elected in 2004 and 2009, topping the poll both times. During this period, Humphreys worked with then Lord Mayor, Andrew Montague to deliver the Dublin Bikes scheme.

He was elected as a Labour Party TD for Dublin South-East at the 2011 general election. On 15 July 2014, he was appointed by the Fine Gael–Labour government as Minister of State at the Department of Social Protection with special responsibility for Employment, Community and Social Support. He lost his Dáil seat at the 2016 general election on 26 February, contesting the enlarged constituency of Dublin Bay South. In April 2016, he was elected to the Seanad. He remained as a junior minister until 6 May 2016 during the talks on government formation. He was an unsuccessful candidate for Dublin Bay South at the 2020 general election.

He was co-opted onto Fingal County Council in December 2024.

Dáil	Election	Deputy (Party)	Deputy (Party)	Deputy (Party)	Deputy (Party)
13th	1948	John A. Costello (FG)	Seán MacEntee (FF)	Noël Browne (CnaP)	3 seats 1948–1981
14th	1951	John A. Costello (FG)	Seán MacEntee (FF)	Noël Browne (Ind.)	3 seats 1948–1981
15th	1954	John A. Costello (FG)	Seán MacEntee (FF)	John O'Donovan (FG)	3 seats 1948–1981
16th	1957	John A. Costello (FG)	Seán MacEntee (FF)	Noël Browne (Ind.)	3 seats 1948–1981
17th	1961	John A. Costello (FG)	Seán MacEntee (FF)	Noël Browne (NPD)	3 seats 1948–1981
18th	1965	John A. Costello (FG)	Seán MacEntee (FF)	Seán Moore (FF)	3 seats 1948–1981
19th	1969	Garret FitzGerald (FG)	Noël Browne (Lab)	Seán Moore (FF)	3 seats 1948–1981
20th	1973	Garret FitzGerald (FG)	Fergus O'Brien (FG)	Seán Moore (FF)	3 seats 1948–1981
21st	1977	Garret FitzGerald (FG)	Ruairi Quinn (Lab)	Seán Moore (FF)	3 seats 1948–1981
22nd	1981	Garret FitzGerald (FG)	Gerard Brady (FF)	Seán Moore (FF)	Richie Ryan (FG)
23rd	1982 (Feb)	Garret FitzGerald (FG)	Gerard Brady (FF)	Ruairi Quinn (Lab)	Alexis FitzGerald Jnr (FG)
24th	1982 (Nov)	Garret FitzGerald (FG)	Gerard Brady (FF)	Ruairi Quinn (Lab)	Joe Doyle (FG)
25th	1987	Garret FitzGerald (FG)	Gerard Brady (FF)	Ruairi Quinn (Lab)	Michael McDowell (PDs)
26th	1989	Garret FitzGerald (FG)	Gerard Brady (FF)	Ruairi Quinn (Lab)	Joe Doyle (FG)
27th	1992	Frances Fitzgerald (FG)	Eoin Ryan Jnr (FF)	Ruairi Quinn (Lab)	Michael McDowell (PDs)
28th	1997	Frances Fitzgerald (FG)	Eoin Ryan Jnr (FF)	Ruairi Quinn (Lab)	John Gormley (GP)
29th	2002	Michael McDowell (PDs)	Eoin Ryan Jnr (FF)	Ruairi Quinn (Lab)	John Gormley (GP)
30th	2007	Lucinda Creighton (FG)	Chris Andrews (FF)	Ruairi Quinn (Lab)	John Gormley (GP)
31st	2011	Lucinda Creighton (FG)	Eoghan Murphy (FG)	Ruairi Quinn (Lab)	Kevin Humphreys (Lab)
32nd	2016	Constituency abolished. See Dublin Bay South.			
