= Ann Graves =

Irish politician

Ann Graves TD
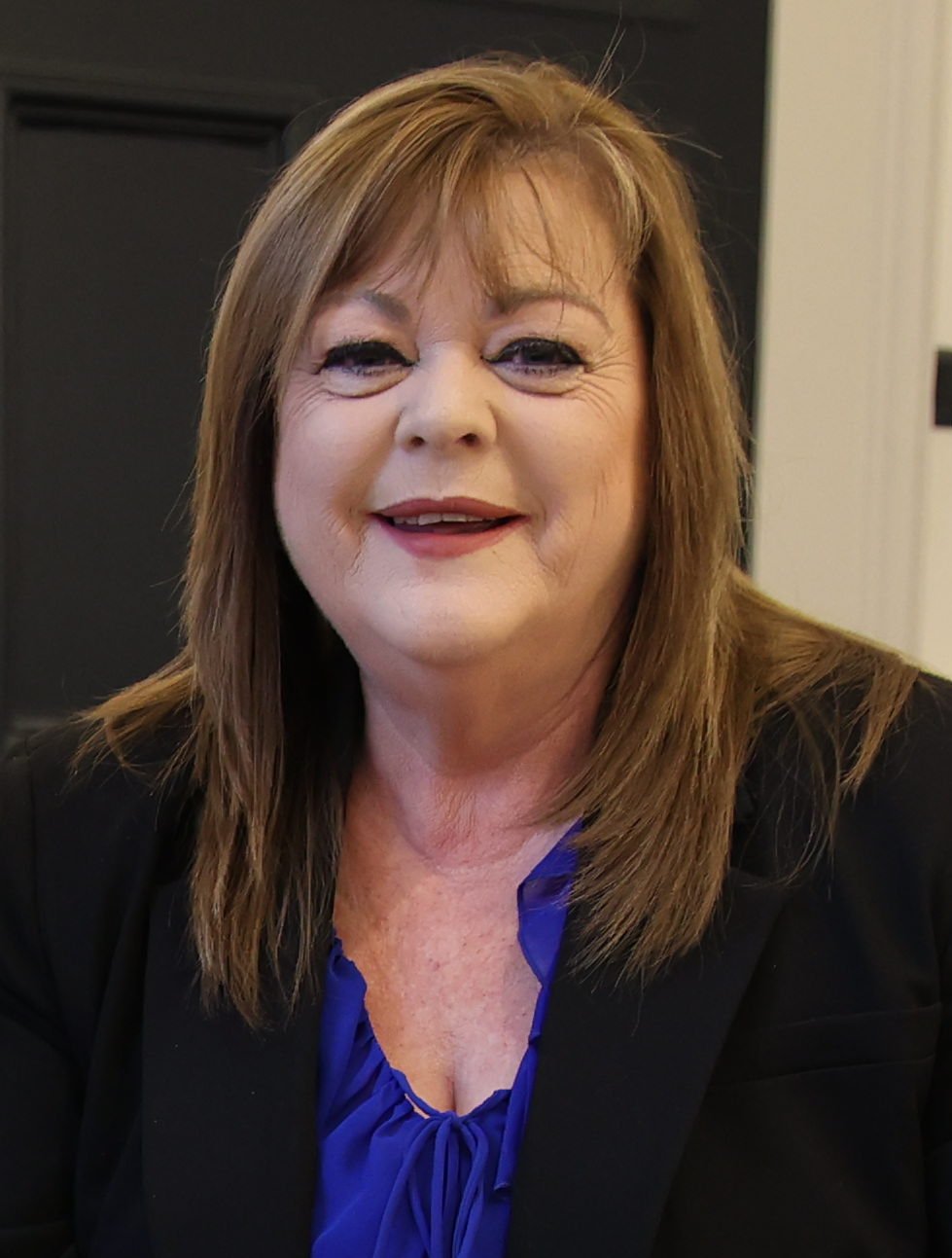
- Graves in 2024

Teachta Dála
- Incumbent
- Assumed office November 2024
- Constituency: Dublin Fingal East

Fingal County Councillor
- In office September 2024 – November 2024
- Constituency: Swords
- In office 12 January 2019 – June 2024
- Constituency: Swords

Personal details
- Party: Sinn Féin
- Children: 3

Ann Graves is an Irish Sinn Féin politician who has been a Teachta Dála (TD) for the Dublin Fingal East constituency since the 2024 general election.

Originally from Drumcondra, Graves has lived in Swords since the early 1990s. She has three adult children and one grandchild. Before entering politics, she worked as a shop steward for the SIPTU trade union in the education sector.

Graves began her political involvement in Fingal by supporting the campaign of Louise O'Reilly, a Sinn Féin TD for the former five-seat Fingal constituency. Graves was co-opted onto Fingal County Council in 2018 and subsequently elected at the 2019 local elections. She was an unsuccessful candidate at the 2019 Dublin Fingal by-election. She lost her council seat at the 2024 Irish local elections, but was co-opted again in September 2024. She serves as the Sinn Féin spokesperson on the National drug strategy, addiction and wellness.

Dáil	Election	Deputy (Party)	Deputy (Party)	Deputy (Party)
34th	2024	Darragh O'Brien (FF)	Duncan Smith (Lab)	Ann Graves (SF)
