= Brendan Ryan (Dublin politician) =

Irish politician (born 1953)

Cllr Brendan Ryan
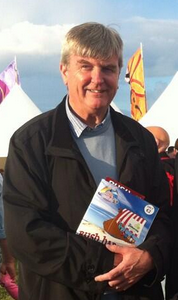
- Ryan in 2013

Fingal County Councillor
- Incumbent
- Assumed office 12 June 2023
- Constituency: Balbriggan

Teachta Dála
- In office February 2016 – February 2020
- Constituency: Dublin Fingal
- In office February 2011 – February 2016
- Constituency: Dublin North

Senator
- In office 13 September 2007 – 26 February 2011
- Constituency: Administrative Panel

Personal details
- Born: 5 February 1953 (age 73) Donabate, Dublin, Ireland
- Party: Labour Party
- Spouse: Margie Monks
- Children: 3
- Relatives: Seán Ryan (brother)
- Education: Dublin Institute of Technology; University College Dublin; Dublin City University

Brendan Ryan (born 5 February 1953) is an Irish Labour Party politician who served as a Teachta Dála (TD) from 2011 to 2020. He was a Senator for the Administrative Panel from 2007 to 2011.

Originally from the Donabate/Portrane area, he lives in Skerries, since he married Margie Monks in the late 1970s. He is a younger brother of Seán Ryan, a former TD for Dublin North. He was educated at Dublin Institute of Technology, University College Dublin and Dublin City University, receiving a degree in chemistry and master's degrees in food science and business administration. He has worked as an operations manager. An unsuccessful candidate at the 2007 general election for Dublin North, he was then elected on the Administrative Panel of Seanad Éireann and served from 2007 to 2011. An active member of the Labour Party since 1978, however, he had never held any elected office or public role before his election to the Seanad.

In 2011, he was elected to the Dáil for the first time. He was one of only seven Labour Party TDs returned to the Dáil at the 2016 general election. Of the other six, four were outgoing ministers and the other two were Ministers of State during the 31st Dáil.

On 8 January 2020, he announced that he would not be contesting the next general election.

In June 2023, Ryan became a member of Fingal County Council for the Balbriggan local electoral area, being co-opted in place of a retiring councillor. He was re-elected at the 2024 Fingal County Council election.

== See also ==
- Families in the Oireachtas

Dáil	Election	Deputy (Party)	Deputy (Party)	Deputy (Party)	Deputy (Party)	Deputy (Party)	Deputy (Party)	Deputy (Party)	Deputy (Party)
4th	1923	Alfie Byrne (Ind.)	Francis Cahill (CnaG)	Margaret Collins-O'Driscoll (CnaG)	Seán McGarry (CnaG)	William Hewat (BP)	Richard Mulcahy (CnaG)	Seán T. O'Kelly (Rep)	Ernie O'Malley (Rep)
4th	1925 by-election	Alfie Byrne (Ind.)	Patrick Leonard (CnaG)	Margaret Collins-O'Driscoll (CnaG)	Oscar Traynor (Rep)	William Hewat (BP)	Richard Mulcahy (CnaG)	Seán T. O'Kelly (Rep)	Ernie O'Malley (Rep)
5th	1927 (Jun)	Alfie Byrne (Ind.)	John Byrne (CnaG)	Margaret Collins-O'Driscoll (CnaG)	Oscar Traynor (SF)	Denis Cullen (Lab)	Richard Mulcahy (CnaG)	Seán T. O'Kelly (FF)	Kathleen Clarke (FF)
6th	1927 (Sep)	Alfie Byrne (Ind.)	John Byrne (CnaG)	Margaret Collins-O'Driscoll (CnaG)	Patrick Leonard (CnaG)	James Larkin (IWL)	Richard Mulcahy (CnaG)	Seán T. O'Kelly (FF)	Eamonn Cooney (FF)
6th	1928 by-election	Alfie Byrne (Ind.)	John Byrne (CnaG)	Margaret Collins-O'Driscoll (CnaG)	Patrick Leonard (CnaG)	Vincent Rice (CnaG)	Richard Mulcahy (CnaG)	Seán T. O'Kelly (FF)	Eamonn Cooney (FF)
6th	1929 by-election	Thomas F. O'Higgins (CnaG)	John Byrne (CnaG)	Margaret Collins-O'Driscoll (CnaG)	Patrick Leonard (CnaG)	Vincent Rice (CnaG)	Richard Mulcahy (CnaG)	Seán T. O'Kelly (FF)	Eamonn Cooney (FF)
7th	1932	Alfie Byrne (Ind.)	John Byrne (CnaG)	Margaret Collins-O'Driscoll (CnaG)	Oscar Traynor (FF)	Cormac Breathnach (FF)	Richard Mulcahy (CnaG)	Seán T. O'Kelly (FF)	Eamonn Cooney (FF)
8th	1933	Alfie Byrne (Ind.)	Patrick Belton (CnaG)	Vincent Rice (CnaG)	Oscar Traynor (FF)	Cormac Breathnach (FF)	Richard Mulcahy (CnaG)	Seán T. O'Kelly (FF)	Eamonn Cooney (FF)
9th	1937	Constituency abolished. See Dublin North-East and Dublin North-West							

Dáil	Election	Deputy (Party)	Deputy (Party)	Deputy (Party)	Deputy (Party)
22nd	1981	Ray Burke (FF)	John Boland (FG)	Nora Owen (FG)	3 seats 1981–1992
23rd	1982 (Feb)	Ray Burke (FF)	John Boland (FG)	Nora Owen (FG)	3 seats 1981–1992
24th	1982 (Nov)	Ray Burke (FF)	John Boland (FG)	Nora Owen (FG)	3 seats 1981–1992
25th	1987	Ray Burke (FF)	John Boland (FG)	G. V. Wright (FF)	3 seats 1981–1992
26th	1989	Ray Burke (FF)	Nora Owen (FG)	Seán Ryan (Lab)	3 seats 1981–1992
27th	1992	Ray Burke (FF)	Nora Owen (FG)	Seán Ryan (Lab)	Trevor Sargent (GP)
28th	1997	Ray Burke (FF)	Nora Owen (FG)	G. V. Wright (FF)	Trevor Sargent (GP)
28th	1998 by-election	Seán Ryan (Lab)	Nora Owen (FG)	G. V. Wright (FF)	Trevor Sargent (GP)
29th	2002	Seán Ryan (Lab)	Jim Glennon (FF)	G. V. Wright (FF)	Trevor Sargent (GP)
30th	2007	James Reilly (FG)	Michael Kennedy (FF)	Darragh O'Brien (FF)	Trevor Sargent (GP)
31st	2011	James Reilly (FG)	Alan Farrell (FG)	Brendan Ryan (Lab)	Clare Daly (SP)
32nd	2016	Constituency abolished. See Dublin Fingal			

Dáil	Election	Deputy (Party)	Deputy (Party)	Deputy (Party)	Deputy (Party)	Deputy (Party)
32nd	2016	Louise O'Reilly (SF)	Clare Daly (I4C)	Brendan Ryan (Lab)	Darragh O'Brien (FF)	Alan Farrell (FG)
32nd	2019 by-election	Louise O'Reilly (SF)	Joe O'Brien (GP)	Brendan Ryan (Lab)	Darragh O'Brien (FF)	Alan Farrell (FG)
33rd	2020	Louise O'Reilly (SF)	Joe O'Brien (GP)	Duncan Smith (Lab)	Darragh O'Brien (FF)	Alan Farrell (FG)
34th	2024	Constituency abolished. See Dublin Fingal East and Dublin Fingal West.				
