= Fingal County Council =

Local authority for Fingal in Ireland

Fingal County Council Comhairle Contae Fhine Gall
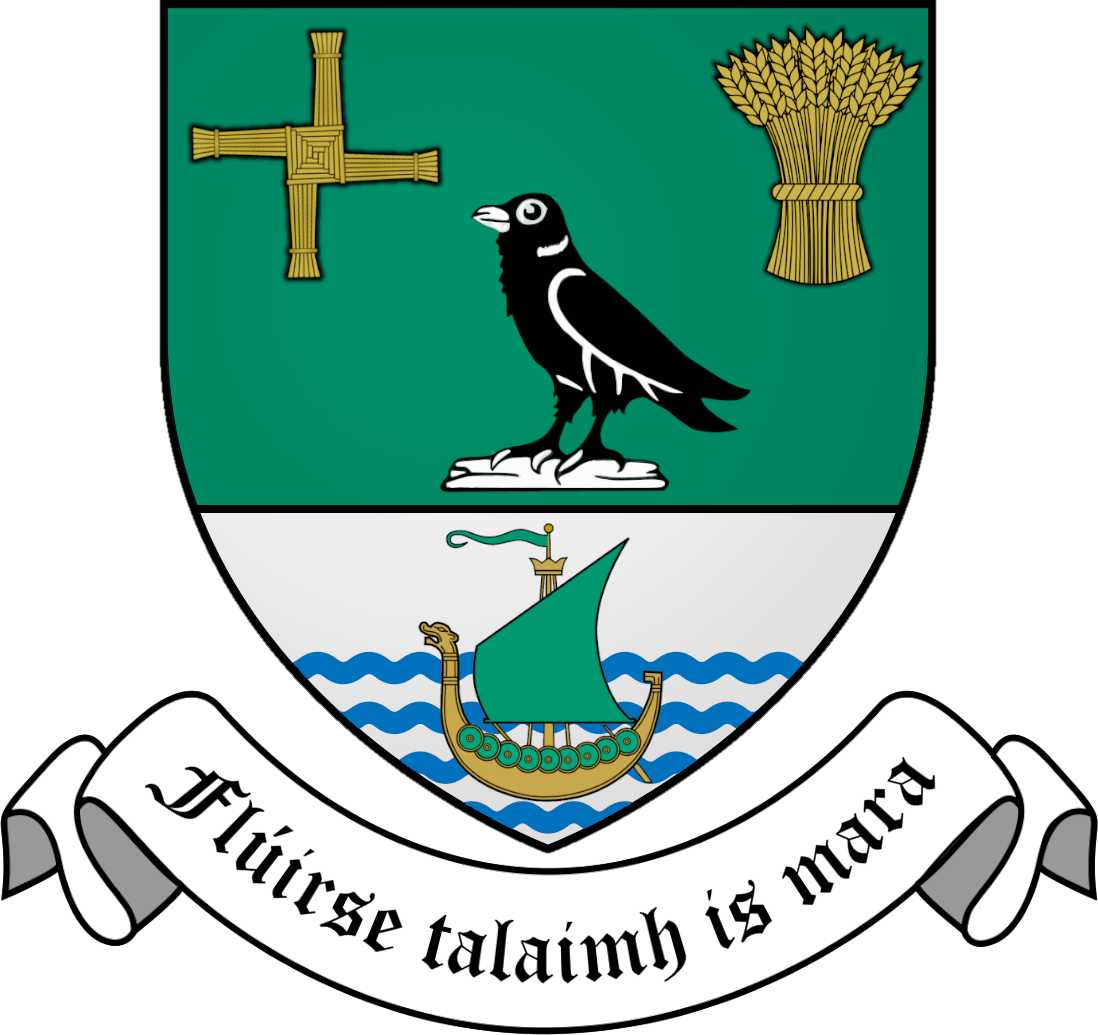

Type
- Type: County council of Fingal

History
- Founded: 1 January 1994

Leadership
- Mayor: Tony Murphy, Ind

Structure
- Seats: 40
- Political groups: Fine Gael (7) Labour (7) Fianna Fáil (6) Sinn Féin (4) Aontú (3) PBP–Solidarity (2) Social Democrats (2) Green (1) Independent (8)

Elections
- Last election: 7 June 2024

Motto
- Irish: Flúirse Talaimh is Mara "Abundance of Land and Sea"

Meeting place
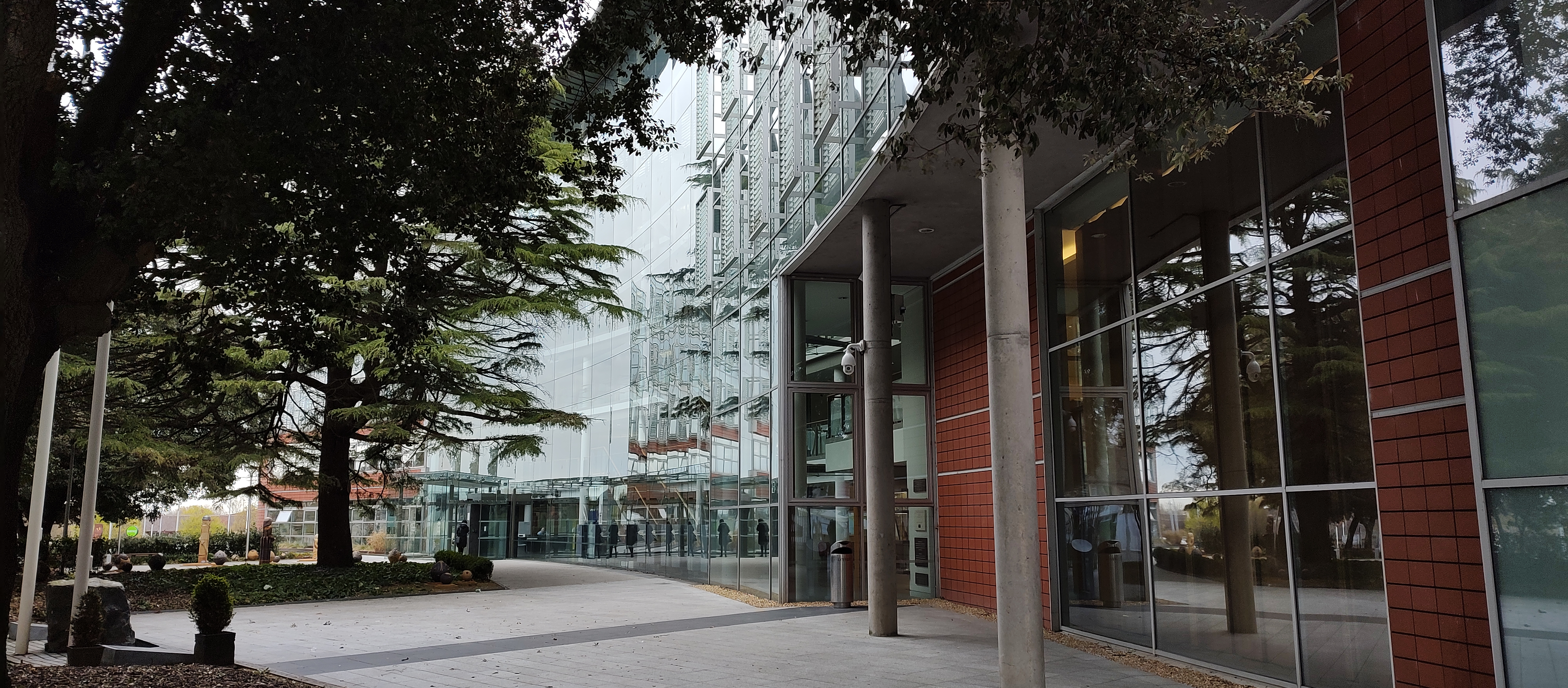
- County Hall, Swords

Website
- Official website

Location of Fingal in Ireland

Fingal County Council (Irish: Comhairle Contae Fhine Gall) is the local authority of the county of Fingal, Ireland. It is one of three local authorities that succeeded the former Dublin County Council on abolition on 1 January 1994 and is one of four local authorities in County Dublin. As a county council, it is governed by the Local Government Act 2001. The council is responsible for housing and community, roads and transport, urban planning and development, amenity and culture, and environment. The council has 40 elected members. Elections are held every five years on the electoral system of proportional representation by means of the single transferable vote (PR-STV). The head of the council has the title of Mayor. The county administration is headed by a chief executive, AnnMarie Farrelly. The county town is Swords.

== History ==
The council of the electoral county of Dublin—Fingal was established in 1985 with 24 members. Its members also sat as members of Dublin County Council. At the 1991 local election, the electoral county was renamed Fingal.

On 1 January 1994, under the Local Government (Dublin) Act 1993, County Dublin ceased to exist with the new county Fingal where the electoral county had been. Dublin County Council also ceased to exist and Fingal County Council came into being.

The county council initially met at the former offices of the abolished Dublin County Council, an office block at 46–49 O'Connell Street, Dublin. A new building, known as County Hall, located on Main Street in Swords, was purpose-built for the county council and completed in 2000.

The Local Government Act 2001 reformed the two-tier structure of local government. It confirmed the size of the council as 24 members.

The town council of Balbriggan was dissolved under the Local Government Reform Act 2014. Fingal County Council became the successor body of the town council. Under the same legislation, the size of the council was increased to 40 members as part of a nationwide reallocation of local authority membership numbers.

== Administrative area ==
The county of Fingal covers an area of 456 km^{2} and has 88 km of coastline stretching from Sutton in the south to Balbriggan in the north. It is drained by the Delvin River along its northern boundary, the Ballyboghil River and the Broadmeadow River and its major tributary, the Ward in the centre, and the Tolka and Santry rivers to the south. The River Liffey forms its southern border with South Dublin. There are three large protected estuaries and salt marsh habitats, with thirteen major beaches. Howth Head and the Liffey Valley are covered by Special Area Amenity Orders.

== Regional Assembly ==
Fingal County Council has three representatives on the Eastern and Midland Regional Assembly who are part of the Dublin Strategic Planning Area Committee.

== Elections ==
Members of Fingal County Council are elected for a five-year term of office on the electoral system of proportional representation by means of the single transferable vote (PR-STV) from multi-member local electoral areas (LEAs).

Year	FF	FG	Lab	GP	SF	SD	Sol	Aon	I4C	NP	PBP	PDs	Ind.	Total
2024	6	7	7	1	4	2	2	2	1	1	0	—N/a	7	40
2019	8	7	6	5	4	2	1	—N/a	1	—N/a	0	—N/a	6	40
2014	7	6	4	2	6	—N/a	4	—N/a	0	—N/a	1	—N/a	10	40
2009	4	6	9	0	0	—N/a	3	—N/a	—N/a	—N/a	0	—N/a	2	24
2004	4	5	6	3	1	—N/a	2	—N/a	—N/a	—N/a	—N/a	1	2	24
1999	6	5	6	1	0	—N/a	2	—N/a	—N/a	—N/a	—N/a	1	2	24
1991	8	6	5	2	—N/a	—N/a	—N/a	—N/a	—N/a	—N/a	—N/a	1	2	24
1985	13	7	3	0	0	—N/a	—N/a	—N/a	—N/a	—N/a	—N/a	—N/a	1	24

The figures for Solidarity (named the Anti-Austerity Alliance 2014 to 2017) include the figures for the Socialist Party, founded in 1996.

== Local electoral areas ==
Fingal is divided into the seven local electoral areas. These are defined by electoral divisions which were defined in 1986, with minor amendments in 1994.

LEA	Definition	Seats
Balbriggan	Balbriggan Rural, Balbriggan Urban, Holmpatrick and Skerries	5
Blanchardstown–Mulhuddart	Blanchardstown-Abbotstown, Blanchardstown-Corduff, Blanchardstown-Mulhuddart, Blanchardstown-Tyrrelstown, Dubber, The Ward; and those parts of the electoral divisions of Blanchardstown-Blakestown and Blanchardstown-Coolmine north of a line drawn along the N3 dual carriageway	5
Castleknock	Blanchardstown-Delwood, Blanchardstown-Roselawn, Castleknock-Knockmaroon, Castleknock-Park, Lucan North; the part of Blanchardstown-Blakestown electoral division situated within the following line: Commencing at the intersection of the boundary between the electoral divisions of Blanchardstown-Blakestown and Lucan North with the R121 Road at the Clonsilla railway station bridge; (referred to hereafter as the first-mentioned point); then proceeding in a north easterly direction along the R121 road to its intersection with the Clonsilla link road; then proceeding in a northerly direction along the Clonsilla link road to its intersection with the Ongar distributor road; then proceeding in a south-easterly direction along the Ongar distributor road to its intersection with Shelerin Road; then proceeding in a southerly direction along Shelerin Road to its intersection with Clonsilla Road; then proceeding in an easterly direction along Clonsilla Road to its intersection with Porterstown Road; then proceeding in a southerly direction along Porterstown Road to the railway line; then proceeding in a westerly direction along the railway line to the first-mentioned point; and that part of the electoral division of Blanchardstown-Coolmine not contained in the local electoral area of Blanchardstown-Mulhuddart	6
Howth–Malahide	Baldoyle, Howth, Malahide East, Malahide West, Portmarnock North, Portmarnock South, Sutton; and those parts of the electoral divisions of Balgriffin, Kinsaley and Swords-Seatown not contained in the local electoral area of Swords	7
Ongar	That part of the electoral division of Blanchardstown-Blakestown not contained in the local electoral area of Castleknock and not contained in the local electoral area of Blanchardstown-Mulhuddart	5
Rush–Lusk	Ballyboghil, Balscadden, Clonmethan, Donabate, Garristown, Hollywood, Lusk and Rush	5
Swords	Airport, Kilsallaghan, Swords-Forrest, Swords-Glasmore, Swords-Lissenhall, Swords Village, Turnapin; and those parts of the electoral divisions of Balgriffin, Kinsaley and Swords-Seatown west of a line drawn along the M1 motorway.	7

== Councillors ==
=== 2024 seats summary ===
Party	Seats
Fine Gael	7
Labour	7
Fianna Fáil	6
Sinn Féin	4
Aontú	2
PBP–Solidarity	2
Social Democrats	2
Green	1
Inds. 4 Change	1
National Party	1
Independent	7

=== Councillors by electoral area ===
This list reflects the order in which councillors were elected on 7 June 2024.

Council members from 2024 election
Local electoral area	Name	Party
Balbriggan	Tony Murphy	Independent
Balbriggan	Gráinne Maguire	Independent
Balbriggan	Brendan Ryan	Labour
Balbriggan	Tom O'Leary	Fine Gael
Balbriggan	Malachy Quinn	Sinn Féin
Blanchardstown–Mulhuddart	Breda Hanaphy	Sinn Féin
Blanchardstown–Mulhuddart	Mary McCamley	Labour
Blanchardstown–Mulhuddart	JK Onwumereh	Fianna Fáil
Blanchardstown–Mulhuddart	John Burtchaell	PBP–Solidarity
Blanchardstown–Mulhuddart	Patrick Quinlan (Note: Changed party, see table for details.)	National Party
Castleknock	Ted Leddy	Fine Gael
Castleknock	John Walsh	Labour
Castleknock	Siobhan Shovlin	Fine Gael
Castleknock	Ellen Troy	Aontú
Castleknock	Ruth Coppinger (Note: Replaced during term, see table below for details.)	PBP–Solidarity
Castleknock	Eimear Carbone-Mangan	Fianna Fáil
Howth–Malahide	Joan Hopkins	Social Democrats
Howth–Malahide	Aoibhinn Tormey	Fine Gael
Howth–Malahide	Cathal Haughey	Fianna Fáil
Howth–Malahide	Jimmy Guerin	Independent
Howth–Malahide	Brian McDonagh	Labour
Howth–Malahide	Eoghan O'Brien	Fianna Fáil
Howth–Malahide	David Healy	Green
Ongar	Tania Doyle	Independent
Ongar	Angela Donnelly	Sinn Féin
Ongar	Kieran Dennison	Fine Gael
Ongar	Tom Kitt	Fianna Fáil
Ongar	Gerard Sheehan	Aontú
Rush–Lusk	Robert O'Donoghue	Labour
Rush–Lusk	Corina Johnston	Labour
Rush–Lusk	Cathal Boland	Independent
Rush–Lusk	Eoghan Dockrell	Fine Gael
Rush–Lusk	Paul Mulville	Social Democrats
Swords	Dean Mulligan}	Inds. 4 Change
Swords	Darragh Butler	Fianna Fáil
Swords	Luke Corkery	Fine Gael
Swords	Joe Newman	Independent
Swords	James Humphreys	Labour
Swords	Darren Jack Kelly	Independent
Swords	Marian Buckley	Sinn Féin

==== Co-options ====
Party	Outgoing	LEA	Reason	Date	Co-optee
Sinn Féin	Marian Buckley	Swords	Resigned on medical grounds	September 2024	Ann Graves
PBP–Solidarity	Ruth Coppinger	Castleknock	Elected to 34th Dáil at the 2024 general election	12 March 2025	Helen Redwood
Labour	Robert O'Donoghue	Rush–Lusk	Elected to 34th Dáil at the 2024 general election	18 December 2024	Kevin Humphreys
Sinn Féin	Ann Graves	Swords	Elected to 34th Dáil at the 2024 general election	18 December 2024	John Smyth
Labour	Kevin Humphreys	Rush–Lusk	Resignation	12 March 2025	Mark Boland
PBP–Solidarity	Helen Redwood	Castleknock	Health issues.	15 September 2026	Kate Relihan

==== Changes in affiliation ====
Name	LEA	Elected as	New affiliation	Date
Darren Jack Kelly	Swords	Independent	Aontú	26 February 2026
Dean Mulligan	Swords	Inds. 4 Change	Independent	10 March 2026
Patrick Quinlan	Blanchardstown–Mulhuddart	National Party	Independent	2 October 2026

== Governance ==
The Mayor and Deputy Mayor are chosen from among the councillors. The chief executive is appointed by central government. The current chief executive is AnnMarie Farrelly.
