= Robert O'Donoghue =

Irish politician

Robert O'Donoghue TD
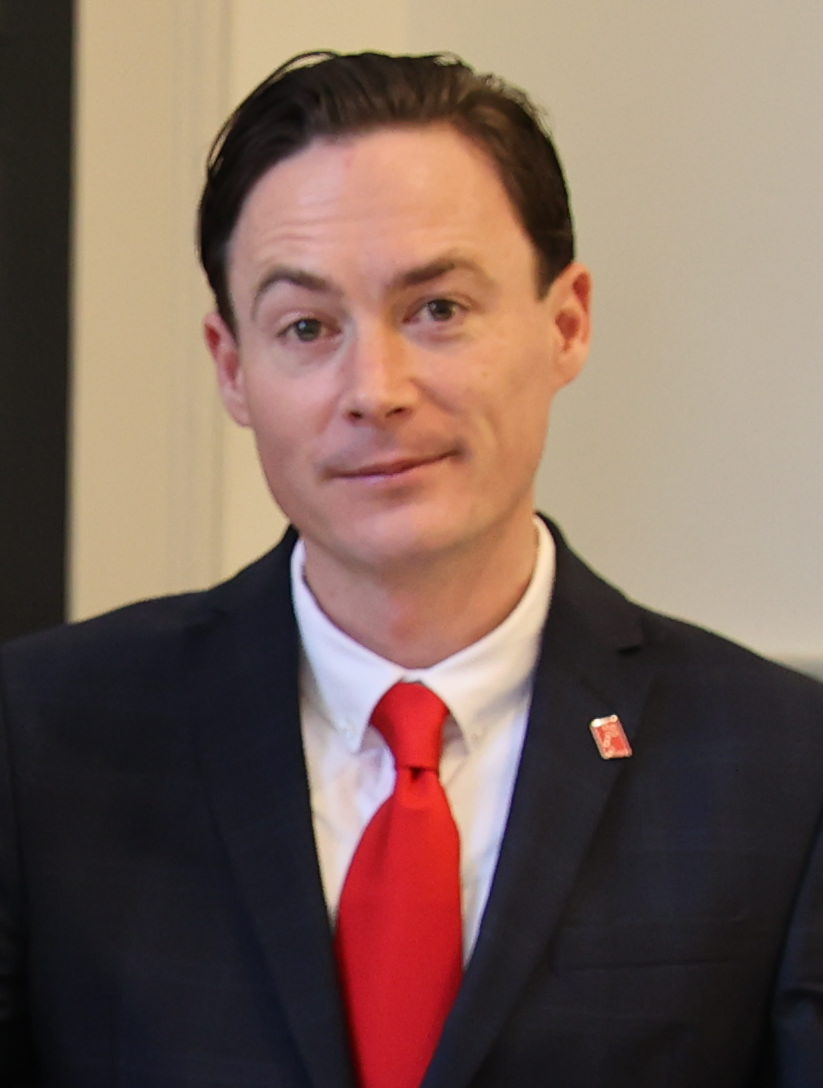
- O'Donoghue in 2024

Teachta Dála
- Incumbent
- Assumed office November 2024
- Constituency: Dublin Fingal West

Personal details
- Born: 1980/1981 (age 44–45)
- Party: Labour Party
- Education: Trinity College Dublin; National College of Ireland

Robert O'Donoghue (born 1980/1981) is an Irish Labour Party politician who has been a Teachta Dála (TD) for the Dublin Fingal West constituency since 2024.

== Early life ==
O'Donoghue is originally from Coolock. He attended St Joseph's Secondary School in Rush and worked there as a substitute teacher after graduating. He later studied psychology, attained a master's degree in European politics from Trinity College Dublin and a higher diploma in data analytics from the National College of Ireland.

== Political career ==
O'Donoghue first got involved in politics during the 2007 referendum on the Treaty of Lisbon, joining the Labour Party in that year. In 2013 he was elected as the chair of the Rush branch of the party. O'Donoghue was co-opted onto Fingal County Council in 2018, replacing the retiring Ken Farrell. Representing the Rush-Lusk area, he topped local elections polls twice, once in 2019 and again in June 2024, with his vote share increasing from 18.6% to 25.9%.

At the 2024 general election, O'Donoghue was elected to the Dáil.

Dáil	Election	Deputy (Party)	Deputy (Party)	Deputy (Party)
34th	2024	Louise O'Reilly (SF)	Robert O'Donoghue (Lab)	Grace Boland (FG)
