= 2009 Fingal County Council election =

Part of the 2009 Irish local elections

← 2004	5 June 2009	2014 →

24 seats on Fingal County Council
	First party	Second party	Third party
Party	Labour	Fine Gael	Fianna Fáil
Seats won	9	6	4
Seat change	▲3	▲1	Steady
	Fourth party	Fifth party	Sixth party
Party	Socialist Party	Independent	Green
Seats won	3	2	0
Seat change	▲1	Steady	▼3
	Seventh party
Party	Sinn Féin
Seats won	0
Seat change	▼1
- Map showing the area of Fingal County Council
Council control after election
TBD

An election to all 24 seats on Fingal County Council took place on 5 June 2009 as part of the 2009 Irish local elections. Fingal was divided into 5 local electoral areas (LEAs) to elect councillors for a five-year term of office on the electoral system of proportional representation by means of the single transferable vote (PR-STV).

== Results by party ==
Party	Seats	±	1st pref	FPv%	±%
Labour	9	▲3	21,117	25.66	
Fine Gael	6	▲1	17,133	20.82	
Fianna Fáil	4	Steady	13,347	16.22	
Socialist Party	3	▲1	11,502	13.98	
Green	0	▼3	4,861	5.91	
Sinn Féin	0	▼1	4,037	4.91	
Seniors Solidarity	0	Steady	1,319	1.60	
Progressive Democrats	—	▼1	—	—	
Independent	2	Steady	8,966	10.90	
Total	24	Steady	82,282	100.00	—

== Results by local electoral area ==
=== Balbriggan ===
Balbriggan - 5 seats
Party	Candidate	FPv%	Count								
Party	Candidate	FPv%	1	2	3	4	5	6	7	8	9
Labour	Ken Farrell	19.14	3,388								
Independent	David O'Connor*	12.94	2,291	2,346	2,388	2,454	2,541	2,623	2,800	3,035	
Fine Gael	Tom O'Leary	10.36	1,833	1,874	1,903	1,926	2,005	2,513	2,586	2,689	2,877
Green	Joe Corr*	8.65	1,531	1,581	1,610	1,671	1,766	1,817	1,928	2,040	2,306
Labour	Ciaran Byrne*	8.02	1,420	1,515	1,752	1,857	1,887	1,975	2,238	2,447	2,585
Independent	May McKeon*	6.99	1,238	1,249	1,315	1,366	1,401	1,514	1,636	2,040	2,432
Independent	Seán Brown	6.07	1,075	1,082	1,125	1,200	1,211	1,300	1,424		
Fine Gael	Larry Dunne	5.71	1,010	1,024	1,059	1,087	1,108				
Fianna Fáil	Dermot Murray	5.56	985	993	1,012	1,046	1,491	1,551	1,584	1,694	
Socialist Party	Terry Kelleher	4.98	882	905	941	1,097	1,109	1,136			
Fianna Fáil	Stephen O'Connell	4.79	848	894	898	911					
Sinn Féin	Fergus Byrne	3.82	677	691	710						
Labour	Grainne Kilmurray	2.95	523	596							
Electorate: 36,258 Valid: 17,701 (48.82%) Spoilt: 248 Quota: 2,951 Turnout: 17,949 (49.50%)

=== Castleknock ===
Castleknock - 4 seats
Party	Candidate	FPv%	Count					
Party	Candidate	FPv%	1	2	3	4	5	6
Socialist Party	Joe Higgins	28.07	3,787					
Fine Gael	Eithne Loftus*	22.45	3,028					
Labour	Peggy Hamill*	16.32	2,201	2,753				
Fianna Fáil	Mags Murray*	12.44	1,678	1,766	1,787	1,869	1,952	2,692
Green	Roderic O'Gorman	9.18	1,238	1,413	1,458	1,649	1,851	2,030
Fianna Fáil	Howard Mahony	6.95	938	983	997	1,033	1,077	
Sinn Féin	Charlie Maples	3.59	484	657	694	714		
Independent	Zahid Hussain	1.01	136	191				
Electorate: 29,622 Valid: 13,490 (45.54%) Spoilt: 138 Quota: 2,699 Turnout: 13,628 (46.01%)

=== Howth–Malahide ===
Howth-Malahide - 5 seats
Party	Candidate	FPv%	Count									
Party	Candidate	FPv%	1	2	3	4	5	6	7	8	9	10
Labour	Peter Coyle*	16.99	3,781									
Fine Gael	Alan Farrell*	12.31	2,739	2,754	2,795	2,832	2,859	2,948	3,002	3,161	3,387	3,499
Fianna Fáil	Eoghan O'Brien*	10.26	2,283	2,288	2,311	2,338	2,360	2,421	2,440	2,500	2,592	3,634
Labour	Cian O'Callaghan	10.14	2,256	2,275	2,283	2,354	2,458	2,507	2,859	3,251	3,610	3,818
Fine Gael	Joan Maher*	10.66	2,372	2,376	2,383	2,454	2,478	2,515	2,582	2,821	3,058	3,283
Independent	Jimmy Guerin	8.15	1,814	1,820	1,842	1,984	2,062	2,099	2,279	2,445	2,871	3,052
Fianna Fáil	Averil Power	7.46	1,659	1,662	1,669	1,710	1,743	1,766	1,826	1,923	2,033	
Seniors Solidarity Party	John Wolfe	5.93	1,319	1,325	1,345	1,422	1,501	1,537	1,721	1,835		
Socialist Party	Brian Greene	4.64	1,032	1,036	1,044	1,063	1,207	1,229				
Green	David Healy*	4.32	962	965	972	1,009	1,041	1,329	1,450			
Sinn Féin	Colm O Murchadha	2.87	638	639	643	653						
Green	Robbie Kelly*	2.77	616	619	632	661	683					
Independent	Eamonn McKiernan	1.53	341	342	359							
Independent	John Seery	1.07	237	238	251							
Independent	Pat Joyce	0.91	202	203								
Electorate: 41,843 Valid: 22,251 (53.18%) Spoilt: 201 Quota: 3,709 Turnout: 22,452 (53.66%)

The Seniors Solidarity Party was founded in November 2008 by John Wolfe following changes to the medical card changes in the 2009 budget. It was registered to contest local elections in Dublin. This was the only election it contested. In December 2014, the registrar of political parties proposed to cancel its registration.

=== Mulhuddart ===
Mulhuddart - 5 seats
Party	Candidate	FPv%	Count						
Party	Candidate	FPv%	1	2	3	4	5	6	7
Labour	Patrick Nulty	14.32	1,898	1,924	1,957	1,965	2,014	2,065	2,178
Socialist Party	Ruth Coppinger*	12.86	1,705	1,733	1,784	1,795	2,241		
Labour	Michael O'Donovan*	12.80	1,696	1,708	1,749	1,758	1,785	1,845	1,987
Fine Gael	Kieran Dennison	12.44	1,649	1,661	1,698	1,707	1,726	1,803	2,320
Sinn Féin	Paul Donnelly*	11.44	1,517	1,532	1,557	1,565	1,641	1,672	1,699
Fianna Fáil	David McGuinness	9.08	1,203	1,213	1,225	1,337	1,347	1,850	1,999
Fine Gael	Adeola Ogunsina	7.28	965	974	1,083	1,294	1,297	1,368	
Fianna Fáil	Niamh Moran	5.45	723	729	760	885	890		
Socialist Party	Denis Keane	4.84	642	656	667	667			
Fianna Fáil	Idowu Sulyman Olafimihan	4.61	611	611	653				
Independent	Iggy Okafor	3.50	464	491					
Independent	Maria McGrail	1.37	182						
Electorate: 30,735 Valid: 13,255 (43.13%) Spoilt: 172 Quota: 2,210 Turnout: 13,427 (43.69%)

=== Swords ===
Swords - 5 seats
Party	Candidate	FPv%	Count									
Party	Candidate	FPv%	1	2	3	4	5	6	7	8	9	10
Socialist Party	Clare Daly*	20.48	3,192									
Labour	Gerry McGuire*	10.09	1,572	1,617	1,623	1,678	1,737	1,848	1,923	2,322	2,433	2,670
Labour	Tom Kelleher*	10.02	1,561	1,637	1,658	1,705	1,790	1,916	1,993	2,221	2,342	2,616
Fianna Fáil	Darragh Butler*	9.54	1,487	1,508	1,517	1,525	1,590	1,628	2,154	2,212	2,285	2,448
Fine Gael	Anne Devitt*	8.75	1,364	1,404	1,426	1,440	1,496	1,539	1,601	1,659	2,028	2,155
Fine Gael	Bob Dowling	7.92	1,234	1,257	1,262	1,266	1,300	1,323	1,353	1,375	1,645	1,728
Fine Gael	James Lawless	6.03	939	960	971	986	1,030	1,056	1,104	1,164		
Fianna Fáil	John Hennessy	5.98	932	951	961	969	996	1,031				
Labour	Pat Ward	5.27	821	861	868	921	957	1,043	1,081			
Independent	Joe O'Neill	4.70	733	773	883	919	982	1,153	1,221	1,309	1,390	
Sinn Féin	Conor Kelly	4.63	721	776	778	863	895					
Green	Kenneth Duffy	3.30	514	542	569	584						
Socialist Party	John McCamley	1.68	262	421	433							
Independent	Carmel Diviney	1.62	253	280								
Electorate: 35,652 Valid: 15,585 (43.71%) Spoilt: 157 Quota: 2,598 Turnout: 15,742 (44.15%)
