= Mícheál Mac Donncha =

Irish politician

Cllr Mícheál Mac Donncha
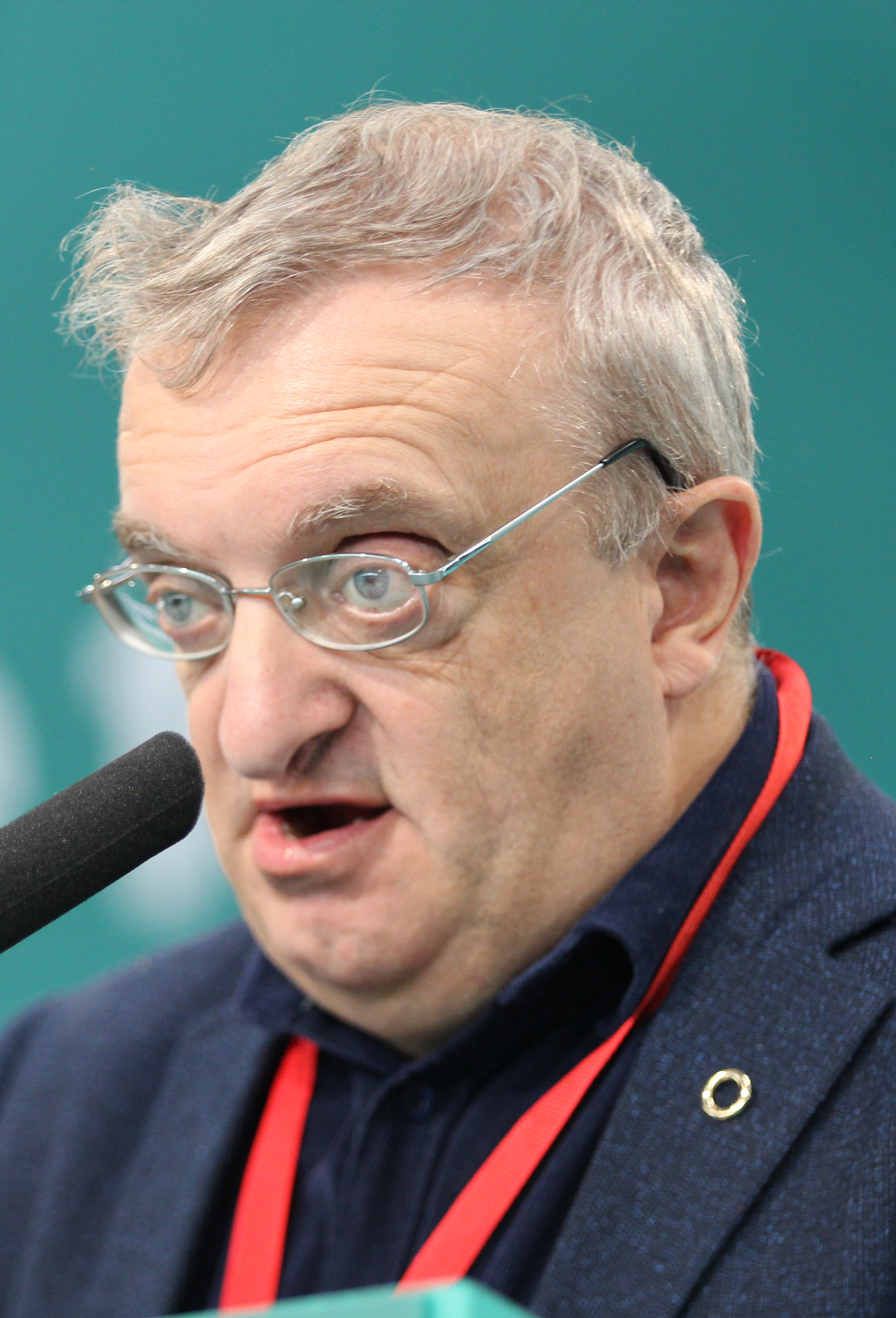
- Mac Donnacha in 2024

Dublin City Councillor
- Incumbent
- Assumed office 21 October 2011
- Constituency: Donaghmede

Lord Mayor of Dublin
- In office 5 June 2017 – 6 June 2018
- Preceded by: Brendan Carr
- Succeeded by: Nial Ring

Personal details
- Born: Michael McConkey c. 1965 Donaghmede, Dublin, Ireland
- Party: Sinn Féin
- Education: University College Dublin

Mícheál Mac Donncha (born Michael McConkey) is an Irish Sinn Féin politician who served as the Lord Mayor of Dublin from 2017 to 2018. He has been a Dublin City Councillor since 2011.

Mac Donncha as a child actor played a young version of the actor Marty Feldman in the 1976 film The Last Remake of Beau Geste.

He was editor of An Phoblacht from 1990 to 1996. From 1997 to 2014, he served as Parliamentary Assistant to Sinn Féin TD Caoimhghín Ó Caoláin and for much of that time was manager of the Sinn Féin Oireachtas team. He is the author of a centenary history of Sinn Féin A Century of Struggle (2005).

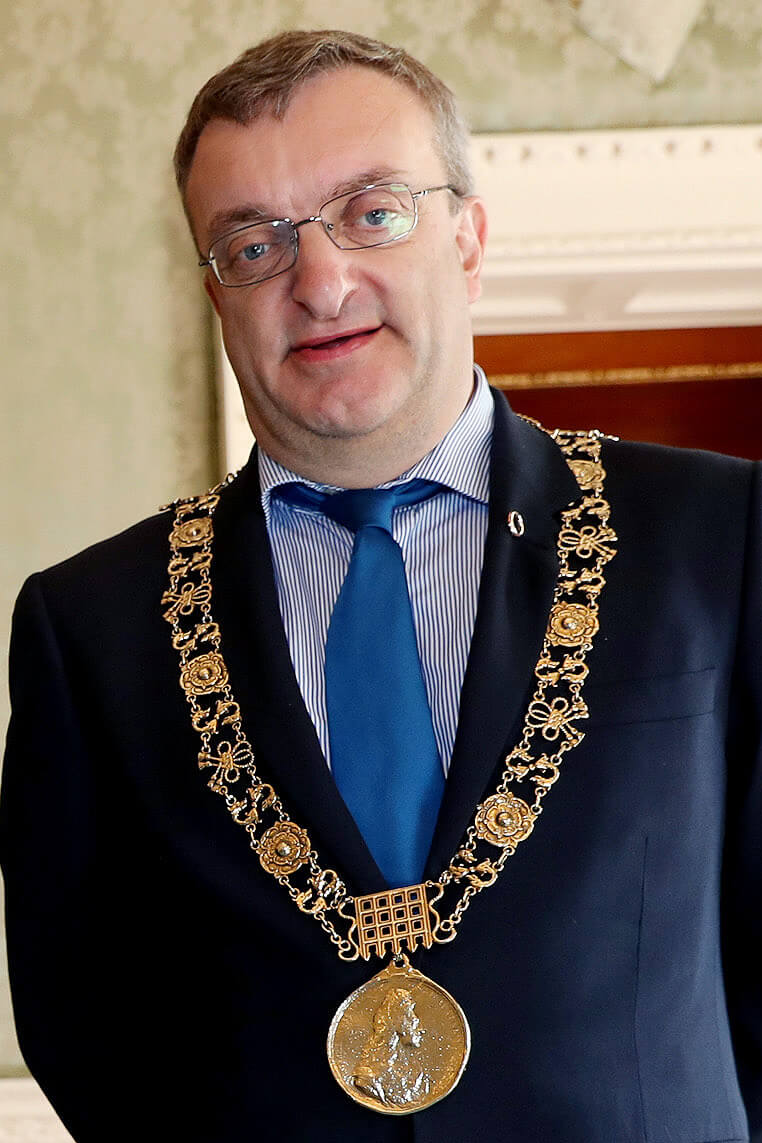
Mac Donnacha as Lord Mayor of Dublin in 2017

He was co-opted onto Dublin City Council in 2011, to fill a vacancy caused by the resignation of Killian Forde. He was elected in 2014 for the Beaumont-Donaghmede local electoral area.

Mac Donncha caused controversy in 2015 when he called the people who run Irish rugby "West Brits" (a derogatory term) because the Irish Rugby team uses "Ireland's Call" when playing outside the country.

Mac Donncha contested the 2016 general election as a Sinn Féin candidate in the Dublin Bay North constituency, one of two party candidates, his running mate Denise Mitchell being elected.

In April 2018, prior to attending a conference in Ramallah, on the status of the city of Jerusalem, Israel announced he would be prohibited from entering Israel to transit to Palestine. Mac Donncha was able to enter Israel and travel to Ramallah. It was later discovered that Israeli officials had mistaken an image caption Ardmhéara Mícheál MacDonncha – as his full name. Ardmheára is the Irish for Lord Mayor.

Civic offices
Preceded by Brendan Carr	Lord Mayor of Dublin; 2017–2018	Succeeded by Nial Ring
