= 2014 Fingal County Council election =

Part of the 2014 Irish local elections

- 23 May 2014

All 40 seats on Fingal County Council 21 seats needed for a majority
	First party	Second party	Third party
Party	Fianna Fáil	Fine Gael	Sinn Féin
Seats won	7	6	6
Seat change	+3	0	+6
	Fourth party	Fifth party	Sixth party
Party	Labour	Anti-Austerity Alliance	Green
Seats won	4	4	2
Seat change	-5	+4	+2
	Seventh party	Eighth party	Ninth party
Party	People Before Profit	Independent	Socialist Party
Seats won	1	10	0
Seat change	+1	+8	-3
- Map showing the area of Fingal County Council
Council control before election
Labour
Council control after election
Fianna Fáil

An election to all 40 seats on Fingal County Council was held on 23 May 2014 as part of the 2014 Irish local elections, an increase from 24 seats at the previous election. Fingal was divided into five local electoral areas (LEAs) to elect councillors from a field of 97 candidates for a five-year term of office on the electoral system of proportional representation by means of the single transferable vote (PR-STV).

Fianna Fáil emerged as the largest party after the elections with 7 seats with 3 net gains and securing 2 seats in each of Castleknock and Swords. Fine Gael retained 6 seats though found themselves without representation in Swords while securing 2 in each of Castleknock and Howth-Malahide. Sinn Féin also secured 6 seats, including 2 seats in Mulhuddart. Labour had a very bad election winning just 4 seats and losing 5 seats as a whole as well as being wiped out in Castleknock. The Anti-Austerity Alliance also made 4 gains, including 2 seats in Mulhuddart, chiefly coming from their former base in the Socialist Party. The Green Party returned to the Council Chamber with 2 seats in each of Castleknock and Howth-Malahide. People Before Profit also secured a seat in the Balbriggan LEA. Independents were however the chief winners in Fingal gaining 8 additional seats to emerge after the elections with a total of 10 seats.

== Results by party ==
Party	Seats	±	1st pref	FPv%
Fianna Fáil	7	+3	13,248	17.92
Fine Gael	6	0	10,865	14.69
Sinn Féin	6	+6	10,785	14.59
Labour	4	−5	8,363	11.31
Anti-Austerity Alliance	4	+4	5,923	8.01
Green	2	+2	3,780	5.11
People Before Profit	1	+1	1,331	1.80
Independent	10	+8	18,798	25.42
Socialist Party	0	-3	-	-
Total	40	+16	73,937	100.00

== Results by local electoral area ==
*: Outgoing councillor.

=== Balbriggan ===
Balbriggan: 8 seats
Party	Candidate	FPv%	Count																	
Party	Candidate	FPv%	1	2	3	4	5	6	7	8	9	10	11	12	13	14	15	16	17	18
Labour	Ken Farrell	12.67	2,073																	
Sinn Féin	Malachy Quinn	9.63	1,575	1,591	1,594	1,603	1,604	1,605	1,623	1,649	1,706	1,721	1,762	1,776	1,809	1,812	1,828			
Independent	Tony Murphy	8.58	1,404	1,412	1,420	1,421	1,460	1,481	1,538	1,628	1,641	1,663	1,800	1,814	1,863					
Independent	David O'Connor	8.11	1,327	1,352	1,357	1,360	1,375	1,384	1,398	1,440	1,464	1,521	1,541	1,577	1,729	1,747	1,859			
Fianna Fáil	Brian Dennehy	6.91	1,130	1,152	1,152	1,153	1,155	1,155	1,155	1,156	1,158	1,177	1,306	1,520	1,581	1,581	1,620	1,625	1,645	1,679
Independent	Grainne Maguire	5.30	868	872	884	884	897	920	945	999	1,015	1,023	1,080	1,095	1,143	1,144	1,174	1,180	1,276	1,685
People Before Profit	Barry Martin	5.13	840	858	860	864	869	874	883	888	928	937	945	1,031	1,070	1,071	1,104	1,107	1,399	1,524
Green	Joe O'Brien	4.91	804	818	824	827	831	835	867	888	902	927	942	983	1,030	1,030	1,206	1,212	1,288	1,362
Fine Gael	J.P. Browne	4.53	742	755	795	795	796	800	808	816	818	931	940	1,072	1,180	1,182	1,422	1,437	1,463	1,500
Independent	Cathal Boland	4.24	694	718	720	721	725	727	738	750	757	780	785	813						
Independent	Richard Davis	4.13	676	680	682	683	704	713	735	783	786	792	838	844	955	958	981	984	1,087	
Fine Gael	Jeanette McNamara	3.64	596	618	631	631	632	633	634	639	647	719	725							
Labour	Ciaran Byrne	3.64	595	629	635	635	638	684	699	710	711	791	797	838	890	894				
Anti-Austerity Alliance	Terry Kelleher	3.49	571	582	588	613	619	621	638	646	856	873	890	895	925	927	962	964		
Fianna Fáil	Darrell Mooney	2.85	467	470	476	480	491	501	514	540	546	553								
Fine Gael	Tom O'Leary	2.75	450	460	467	469	472	477	485	491	493									
Independent	Frank Snowe	2.22	363	365	365	369	383	394	415											
Anti-Austerity Alliance	Denise Parker	1.89	309	315	316	388	394	397	419	435										
Independent	Garrett Mullan	1.75	286	289	290	294	306	314												
Independent	Niall Keady	1.02	167	168	169	169														
Labour	Peadar O'Kelly	0.98	161	171	173	173	176													
Anti-Austerity Alliance	Maurice Sweeney	0.85	139	140	140															
Fine Gael	Jean Fay Brady	0.76	125	128																
Electorate: 37,451 Valid: 16,362 (43.69%) Spoilt: 218 Quota: 1,819 Turnout: 16,580 (44.27%)

=== Castleknock ===
Castleknock: 7 seats
Party	Candidate	FPv%	Count													
Party	Candidate	FPv%	1	2	3	4	5	6	7	8	9	10	11	12	13	14
Fianna Fáil	Jack Chambers	18.61	2,603													
Sinn Féin	Natalie Treacy	13.96	1,953													
Green	Roderic O'Gorman	9.96	1,393	1,457	1,472	1,483	1,499	1,512	1,559	1,618	1,669	1,770				
Fine Gael	Eithne Loftus	7.72	1,080	1,144	1,145	1,147	1,149	1,153	1,163	1,215	1,218	1,414	1,451	1,498	1,713	1,719
Fine Gael	Ted Leddy	6.95	973	1,066	1,068	1,070	1,075	1,086	1,097	1,120	1,123	1,306	1,376	1,439	1,613	1,624
Labour	John Walsh	5.59	782	802	809	812	816	819	837	858	883	925	966	997		
Fianna Fáil	Mags Murray	5.15	721	898	908	910	911	919	930	961	975	1,021	1,055	1,473	1,593	1,595
Fine Gael	Henry Minogue	4.80	671	695	698	703	706	709	717	739	741					
Independent	Mary Martin	4.62	647	694	705	714	726	747	770	848	899	932	1,140	1,215	1,336	1,338
Anti-Austerity Alliance	Sandra Kavanagh	4.22	591	611	658	669	687	701	738	777	1,137	1,142	1,243	1,265	1,344	1,344
Fianna Fáil	Edward MacManus	3.56	498	728	734	735	744	751	754	793	794	827	870			
Independent	T.J. Clare	3.38	473	522	532	551	568	627	650	706	745	764				
Independent	Seán Lyons	3.17	444	473	481	499	515	534	549							
Anti-Austerity Alliance	Matthew Waine	3.11	435	442	482	489	499	502	593	630						
People Before Profit	Memet Uludag	2.19	306	314	338	346	355	357								
Independent	Dermot Casey	1.16	162	168	175	184	187									
Direct Democracy	Robert Long	1.04	145	154	159	163										
Independent	John Kidd	0.81	113	120	128											
Electorate: 30,539 Valid: 13,990 (45.81%) Spoilt: 164 Quota: 1,749 Turnout: 14,154 (46.35%)

=== Howth–Malahide ===
Howth–Malahide: 8 seats
Party	Candidate	FPv%	Count								
Party	Candidate	FPv%	1	2	3	4	5	6	7	8	9
Independent	Cian O'Callaghan	16.12	2,868								
Fianna Fáil	Eoghan O'Brien	14.26	2,537								
Sinn Féin	Daire Ní Laoi	12.09	2,151								
Independent	Jimmy Guerin	10.00	1,779	1,972	2,020						
Fine Gael	Anthony Lavin	9.41	1,674	1,696	1,776	1,779	1,784	1,787	1,980		
Green	David Healy	6.78	1,206	1,384	1,413	1,454	1,468	1,473	1,510	1,692	1,892
Labour	Brian McDonagh	6.57	1,168	1,215	1,246	1,257	1,262	1,263	1,375	1,433	2,039
Fine Gael	Keith Redmond	6.45	1,148	1,252	1,270	1,274	1,280	1,281	1,566	1,654	1,768
Labour	Judy Dunne	5.18	922	969	981	991	996	996	1,149	1,201	
Fine Gael	Marie O'Toole	4.88	868	894	914	918	919	921			
Fianna Fáil	Aileen Woods	4.28	761	821	1,124	1,141	1,146	1,158	1,217	1,326	1,401
Independent	David O'Connor	3.40	604	800	816	886	949	961	974		
Independent	Lech Szczecinski	0.58	104	122	125	139					
Electorate: 42,532 Valid: 17,790 (41.83%) Spoilt: 237 Quota: 1,977 Turnout: 18,027 (42.38%)

=== Mulhuddart ===
Mulhuddart: 8 seats
Party	Candidate	FPv%	Count													
Party	Candidate	FPv%	1	2	3	4	5	6	7	8	9	10	11	12	13	14
Sinn Féin	Paul Donnelly	27.26	3,201													
Anti-Austerity Alliance	Ruth Coppinger	21.78	2,568													
Fianna Fáil	David McGuinness	11.58	1,360													
Fine Gael	Kieran Dennison	7.46	876	916	969	970	976	981	1,032	1,036	1,062	1,080	1,083	1,088	1,358	
Labour	Mary McCamley	4.96	582	626	686	689	696	699	724	731	749	768	777	782	839	923
Labour	Michael O'Donovan	4.31	506	552	602	604	607	611	625	632	655	667	678	683	777	802
Fine Gael	Philip O'Callaghan	3.64	428	463	487	488	503	583	593	610	619	625	629			
Independent	Lorna Nolan	3.02	355	438	500	509	528	530	544	558	578	677	733	762	779	1,038
Sinn Féin	Edmond Lukusa	3.01	353	1,376												
Independent	Freddie Cooper	1.92	226	265	291	295	362	364	368	375	408					
Fine Gael	Maria McGrail	1.92	225	251	267	268	273	275								
Anti-Austerity Alliance	Annette Hughes†††	1.83	215	427	1,006	1,020	1,028	1,030	1,039	1,196	1,216	1,258	1,490			
Fianna Fáil	Margaret Richardson	1.81	213	267	292	296	300	328	337	342						
Anti-Austerity Alliance	Bernadette Rynne	1.59	187	276	396	407	409	410	414	460	479	490				
People Before Profit	Louise Bayliss	1.58	185	287	382	393	407	409	415	425	439	502	567	638	657	
Independent	Dermot Casey	1.27	149	184	200	205										
Anti-Austerity Alliance	Jimmy Keenan	0.98	115	183	320	325	330	331	334							
Electorate: 30,364 Valid: 11,744 (38.68%) Spoilt: 186 Quota: 1,305 Turnout: 11,930 (39.29%)

=== Swords ===
Swords: 9 seats
Party	Candidate	FPv%	Count																
Party	Candidate	FPv%	1	2	3	4	5	6	7	8	9	10	11	12	13	14	15	16	17
Sinn Féin	Philip Lynam	11.05	1,552																
Fianna Fáil	Darragh Butler	10.06	1,414																
Independent	Joe Newman	7.09	996	1,003	1,004	1,014	1,030	1,035	1,036	1,149	1,174	1,196	1,207	1,212	1,246	1,311	1,344	1,407	
Anti-Austerity Alliance	Eugene Coppinger	5.64	793	826	827	835	843	881	897	931	962	999	1,006	1,015	1,039	1,199	1,285	1,353	1,372
Fianna Fáil	Adrian Henchy	5.56	781	784	786	787	794	799	803	807	822	836	839	936	968	972	1,160	1,508	
Independent	Justin Sinnott	5.54	779	786	786	801	820	828	941	976	989	1,010	1,038	1,045	1,063	1,116	1,140	1,180	1,190
Fianna Fáil	Joe Hennessy	5.43	763	768	771	772	790	791	801	817	838	869	890	905	938	967	994		
Independent	Paul Mulville	4.85	682	689	689	696	746	758	766	783	805	842	857	917	948	1,026	1,236	1,274	1,283
Independent	Anne Devitt	4.72	663	673	674	677	686	700	746	766	792	855	901	914	995	1,070	1,183	1,273	1,305
Independent	Michael Collins	4.73	664	669	669	672	699	706	712	716	734	823	832	898	920	955			
Labour	Duncan Smith	4.40	618	622	622	625	630	642	654	662	693	711	775	834	1,037	1,065	1,087	1,143	1,156
Fine Gael	Bob Dowling	4.18	588	589	589	589	592	594	599	603	616	628	822	884	957	963	1,074	1,110	1,129
Labour	Gerry McGuire	3.45	485	488	488	493	501	502	503	506	524	529	545						
Labour	Tom Kelleher	3.35	471	474	474	474	475	478	482	491	536	555	578	677					
United Left	Declan McCool	3.05	428	442	442	445	459	591	598	615	646	676	682	688	704				
Fine Gael	Dianne Sexton	3.00	421	423	423	428	429	433	439	449	473	489							
Green	Ken Duffy	2.68	377	385	385	388	394	400	403	410									
Independent	Duane Browne	2.66	374	381	381	384	395	410	429	440	462								
Independent	Joseph O'Neill	2.22	312	317	317	323	349	349	352										
Independent	Ian Croft	1.99	280	285	285	287	289	289											
United Left	Ken Doyle	1.93	271	279	279	281	284												
Independent	Mark Savage	0.92	129	134	134	140													
Independent	Anthony Moore	0.78	110	112	112	116													
Independent	Lech Szczecinski	0.40	56	57	57														
Independent	Fergal O'Connell	0.16	23	23	23														
Independent	Tony O'Byrne	0.15	21	22	22														
Electorate: 36,807 Valid: 14,051 (38.17%) Spoilt: 189 Quota: 1,406 Turnout: 14,240 (38.69%)

== Changes ==
=== Co-options ===
Party	Outgoing	LEA	Reason	Date	Co-optee
Anti-Austerity Alliance	Ruth Coppinger	Mulhuddart	Elected to the 31st Dáil at the 2014 Dublin West by-election.	18 August 2014	Matthew Waine
Anti-Austerity Alliance	Annette Hughes	Mulhuddart	Health issues.	28 May 2015	Tania Doyle
Fianna Fáil	Jack Chambers	Castleknock	Elected to the 32nd Dáil at the 2016 general election.	26 February 2016	Howard Mahony
Fine Gael	J.P. Browne	Balbriggan	Work Commitments.	26 February 2016	Tom O'Leary
Independent	David O'Connor	Balbriggan	Resigned to take up a position as President of Cricket Ireland.	21 July 2018	Cathal Boland
Labour	Ken Farrell	Balbriggan	Heath issues.	21 July 2018	Robert O'Donoghue
Sinn Féin	Philip Lynam	Swords	Work Commitments	12 January 2019	Ann Graves

=== Changes in affiliation ===
Name	LEA	Elected as	New affiliation	Date
David McGuinness	Mulhuddart	Fianna Fáil	Independent	9 April 2015
Cian O'Callaghan	Howth–Malahide	Independent	Social Democrats	24 September 2015
Keith Redmond	Howth–Malahide	Fine Gael	Renua	8 October 2015
Keith Redmond	Howth–Malahide	Renua	Independent	December 2016
Paul Mulville	Swords	Independent	Social Democrats	24 August 2017
Tania Doyle	Mulhuddart	Anti-Austerity Alliance	Independent	October 2017
