= Cian O'Callaghan =

Irish politician (born 1979)

Cian O'Callaghan TD
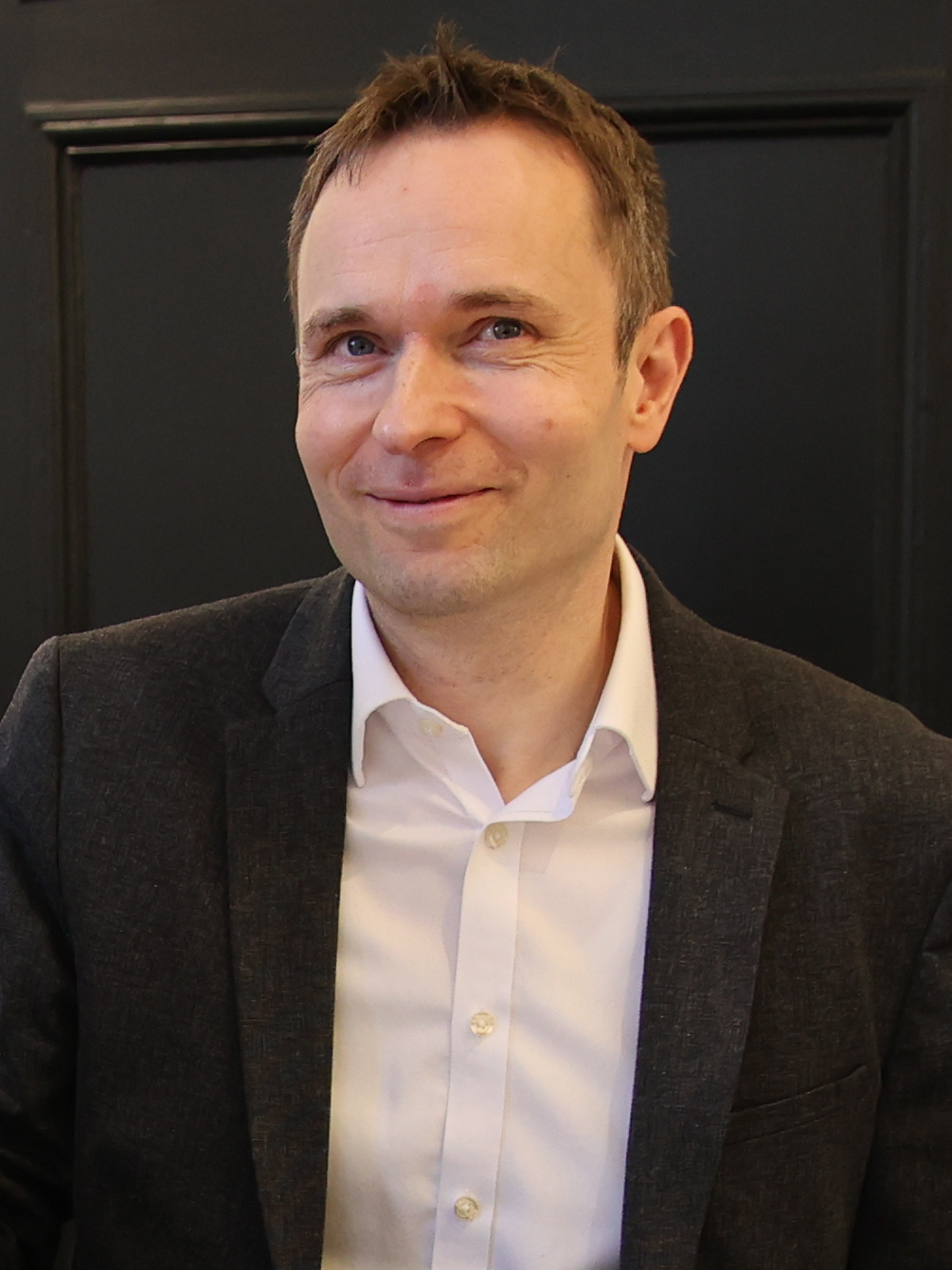
- O'Callaghan in 2024

Deputy leader of the Social Democrats
- Incumbent
- Assumed office 1 July 2023
- Leader: Holly Cairns
- Preceded by: Position established

Teachta Dála
- Incumbent
- Assumed office February 2020
- Constituency: Dublin Bay North

Personal details
- Born: 7 May 1979 (age 47) Dublin, Ireland
- Party: Social Democrats
- Other political affiliations: Democratic Left (before 1999); Labour Party (1999–2013)
- Education: University College Dublin

Cian O'Callaghan (born 7 May 1979) is an Irish politician who has been a Teachta Dála (TD) for the Dublin Bay North constituency since the 2020 general election. He is the Finance, Public Expenditure, Infrastructure, Public Service Reform and Digitalisation spokesperson for the Social Democrats and became deputy leader of the party in 2023. He served as a member of Fingal County Council from 2009 to 2020, and was Ireland's first openly gay mayor.

== Early life ==
O'Callaghan is from Sutton, Dublin. He graduated with a MA in Politics and a Higher Diploma in Social Policy from University College Dublin (UCD). During his time at UCD, O'Callaghan was active in student politics, becoming an officer in the Student's Union.

O'Callaghan served as chair of the youth wing of Democratic Left, and served as co-chair of Labour Youth following the merger of Democratic Left with Labour.

== Political career ==
=== Fingal County Council ===
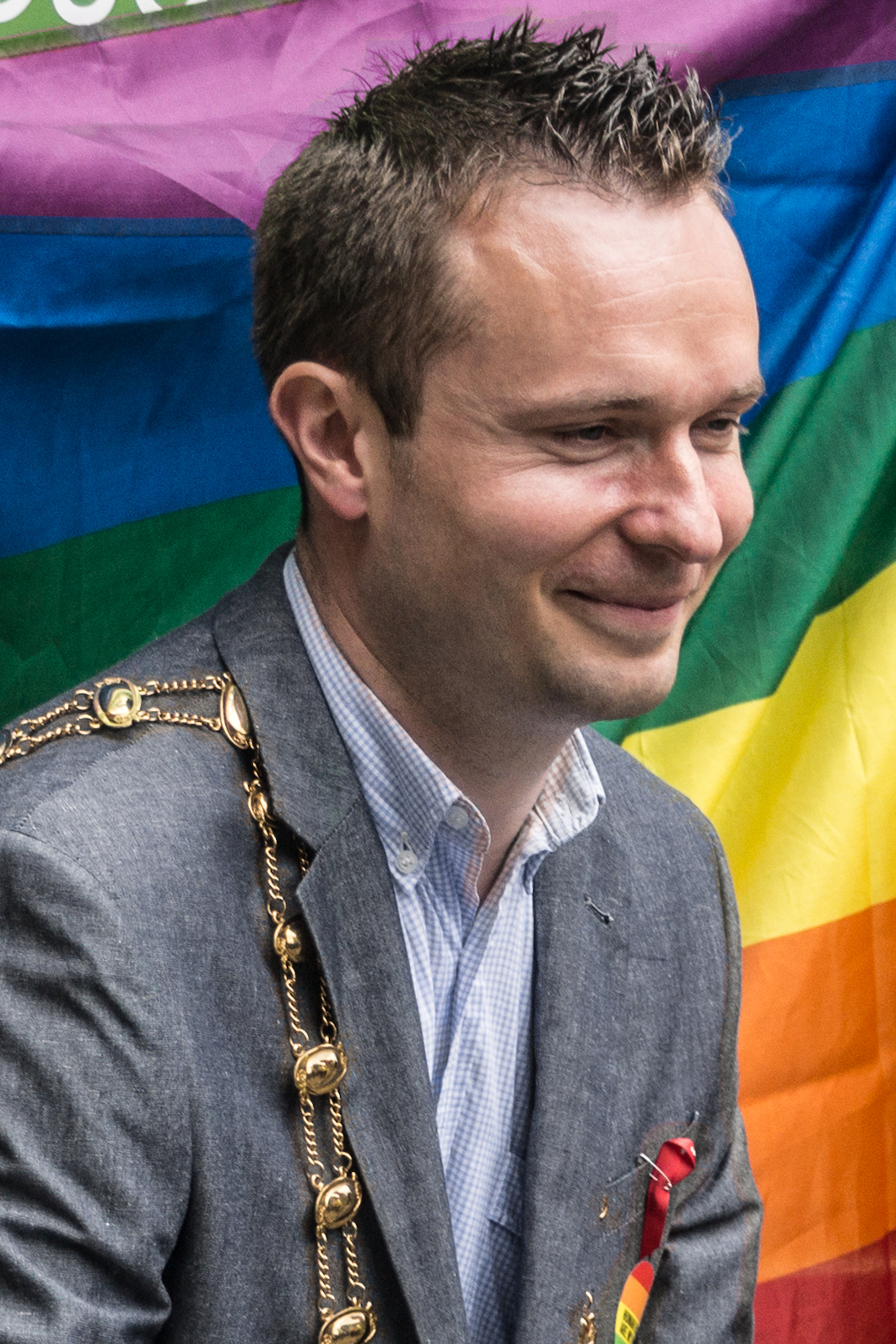
O'Callaghan in 2012 as Mayor of Fingal attending Dublin Pride

O'Callaghan was elected to Fingal County Council on his first attempt in 2009, representing Labour, taking the second seat in the Howth-Malahide local electoral area. Following the results of the 2011 Irish general election, O'Callaghan fiercely opposed Labour entering into a coalition government with Fine Gael.

In June 2012, he was elected as Mayor of Fingal, becoming the first openly gay mayor in the country's history. During his time as mayor he highlighted the problems faced by homeowners in a number of newer developments in the Fingal area, where building materials contaminated with pyrite caused severe damage. It was also during this period that O'Callaghan clashed with Labour leader Eamon Gilmore over a number of issues; O'Callaghan criticised Gilmore for placing Labour in a coalition with Fine Gael, for his stance on Irish neutrality and for his stance on the use of Shannon Airport by US military flights.

During his time in Labour, O'Callaghan was considered to have been the political protege of Labour TD Tommy Broughan. Both Broughan and O'Callaghan were considered to be on the left wing of the Labour Party in that period.

In July 2013, O'Callaghan left the Labour Party, stating the impetus was "the introduction of two budgets in a row that actually increased income inequality by targeting people on low and middle incomes was deeply unjust".

Running as an Independent candidate at the 2014 local elections, O'Callaghan topped the poll in the Howth-Malahide local electoral area.

O'Callaghan was subsequently reelected to Fingal County Council at the 2019 local elections with 13.8% of the vote.

=== Social Democrats ===
O'Callaghan was a founding member of the Social Democrats when they launched the party in July 2015. O'Callaghan stated his reason for joining the party was "because the party has a serious plan for the long term that will give people security in the areas of health, housing and employment.

O'Callaghan contested the 2016 general election for the Social Democrats in Dublin Bay North and received 3,864 first preference votes, being eliminated on the 12th count.

He was the Social Democrats candidate for the Dublin Bay North constituency at the 2020 general election, receiving 6,229 first preference votes, and was elected, taking the third of five seats. In doing so, O'Callaghan took up the seat of his former mentor Tommy Broughan, who had decided not to contest that year's election. Joan Hopkins was co-opted to O'Callaghan's seat on Fingal County Council following his election to the Dáil.

Following the election, O'Callaghan was named as the Social Democrats' spokesperson on Housing, International Affairs and Defence.

As of 2020, O'Callaghan opposes any potential merger of the Social Democrats with the Labour Party. However, O'Callaghan believes that the left-wing parties in Irish politics should work broadly together.

In June 2021 O'Callaghan accused the government of allowing "wild west" standards to develop in the building trade and urged them to correct course following the revelations that thousands of homes across the west coast of Ireland and in Dublin were crumbling because of the use of poor building materials such as mica and pyrite. O'Callaghan stated "We are going to be in a situation again, with the taxpayer picking up the bill, if the Government doesn't act in terms of building standards and construction material standards. In particular, we need to have very strong standards put in place, very strong regulation and very strong independent inspections. The Government is operating this kind of wild west on building standards and materials."

In March 2022 O'Callaghan introduced a bill that would make it explicitly illegal for landlords to demand sex as a form of rent or to make any sort of advertising suggesting that sex would be accepted as a form of rent. The government said they would not oppose the measure.

O'Callaghan has been calling on the Government to increase the number of affordable purchase homes and tabled an amendment in the Dáil (which was ultimately voted down by Government) for the introduction of affordable housing zoning. In June 2023, O'Callaghan criticised the Government's 1-billion-euro underspend from the 2022 housing budget and accusing the Taoiseach of 'dressing up failure as success' in relation to their housing delivery. O'Callaghan described the lack of capital funding as 'hard to grasp' where there are record levels of homelessness, house prices and rents.

O'Callaghan has called the levels of child homelessness a 'national disaster'.

On 1 July 2023, it was announced that O'Callaghan had been appointed to the newly created role of deputy leader of the Social Democrats.

At the 2024 general election, O'Callaghan was re-elected to the Dáil. He is now the party's spokesperson on Finance; Public Expenditure, Infrastructure, Public Service Reform and Digitalisation.

Elections to the Dáil
Party	Election		FPv	FPv%	Result
Social Democrats	Dublin Bay North	2016	3,864	5.2	Eliminated on count 12/15
Social Democrats	Dublin Bay North	2020	6,229	8.7	Elected on count 14/14
Social Democrats	Dublin Bay North	2024	9,738	14.9	Elected on count 8/14

Elections to Fingal County Council
Party	Election		FPv	FPv%	Result
Labour	Howth–Malahide LEA	2009	2,256	10.1	Elected on count 10/10
Independent	Howth–Malahide LEA	2014	2,868	16.2	Elected on count 1/9
Social Democrats	Howth–Malahide LEA	2019	2,717	13.8	Elected on count 1/3

Dáil	Election	Deputy (Party)	Deputy (Party)	Deputy (Party)	Deputy (Party)	Deputy (Party)
32nd	2016	Denise Mitchell (SF)	Tommy Broughan (I4C)	Finian McGrath (Ind.)	Seán Haughey (FF)	Richard Bruton (FG)
33rd	2020	Denise Mitchell (SF)	Cian O'Callaghan (SD)	Aodhán Ó Ríordáin (Lab)	Seán Haughey (FF)	Richard Bruton (FG)
34th	2024	Denise Mitchell (SF)	Cian O'Callaghan (SD)	Barry Heneghan (Ind.)	Tom Brabazon (FF)	Naoise Ó Muirí (FG)
