= Barry Heneghan =

Irish politician

Barry Heneghan TD
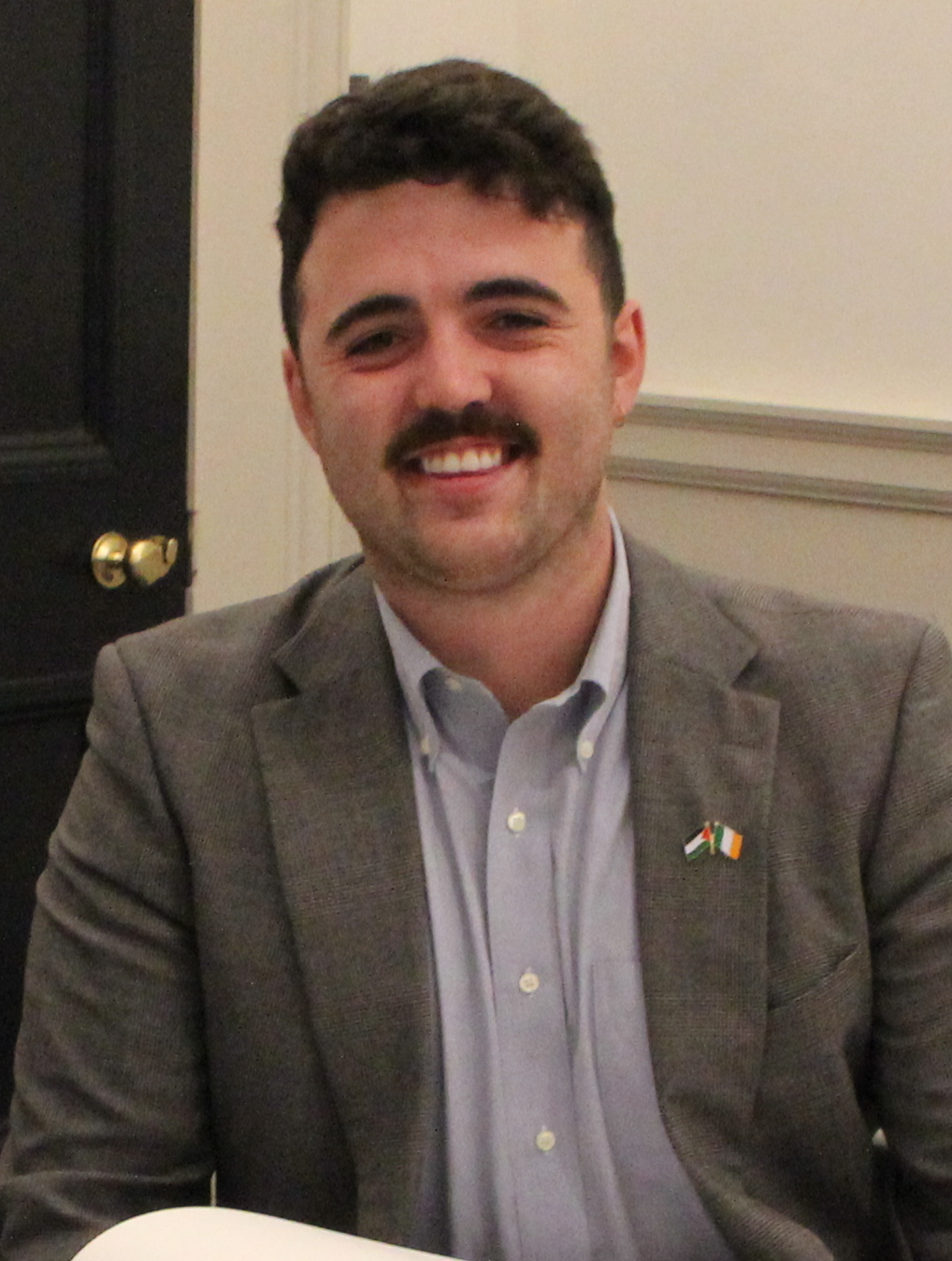
- Heneghan in 2024

Teachta Dála
- Incumbent
- Assumed office November 2024
- Constituency: Dublin Bay North

Personal details
- Born: 1997/1998 (age 27–28)
- Party: Independent
- Relatives: Ciara Ní É (sister)
- Education: Dublin City University
- Website: barryheneghan.ie

Barry Heneghan (born 1997/1998), also known as Barra Ó hÉanacháin, is an Irish independent politician who has been a Teachta Dála (TD) for the Dublin Bay North constituency since the 2024 general election.

== Early life and education ==
Heneghan attended Belvedere College. During his time in school, he was awarded the Zayed Sustainability Prize for pioneering on-site energy and water sustainability with solar power and rainwater harvesting.

Heneghan graduated from Dublin City University in 2022 with a Master's degree.

== Media career ==
Heneghan was the presenter of the TG4 show Barragram.

== Political career ==
The Phoenix described Heneghan as "a political protégé of the former Independent TD Finian McGrath."

Heneghan was elected to Dublin City Council for the first time at the 2024 Dublin City Council election for Clontarf area, taking the seat of outgoing councillor Damien O'Farrell, who had also previously been endorsed by McGrath.

Heneghan had the backing of Finian McGrath in the 2024 general election and was one of the youngest candidates elected, at age 26. Following his election, the Irish Independent reported that Heneghan had been photographed at a community event with Dean Russell, a figure with past criminal convictions.

Heneghan was a member of the Regional Independents Group prior to its dissolution, which played a key role in negotiating the programme for government. Although aligned with the government, he was one of four TDs from the group who later sought opposition speaking rights in the Dáil, making the case for greater representation of independent and regional perspectives. The Ceann Comhairle, Verona Murphy, ultimately ruled that TDs affiliated with the government could not form a Technical group.

== Political views ==
Heneghan stated in 2024 that he aims to improve access to home ownership for younger people and supports a target of up to 60,000 new homes being constructed in the next term. He proposed approaches including modular housing and increased taxes on vacant properties as strategies to boost housing supply. Additionally, Heneghan stated that he intended to champion enhanced rights for individuals with disabilities and advocate for reforms in special education.

In January 2025, he was criticised for nominating Sharon Keogan for election to the 27th Seanad, due to her controversial views on several topics.

Heneghan stated in May 2025 that he supported the government, but that he maintained his independence, "Right now, I am supporting the Government, and that is purely to be in a better position to be able to deliver for Dublin Bay North."

In April 2025, Heneghan moved his seat in the Dáil away from fellow Independent TD Michael Lowry to emphasise his independent status and distance himself from behaviour he considered "demeaning to the electorate". He stated that while he remains a member of the technical group and supports the Programme for Government, his support is contingent upon the progression of his priorities.

In May 2025, Heneghan voted against the coalition government in favour of a Sinn Féin motion supporting Palestine. He stated that he voted with his conscience and criticised the lack of a detailed government briefing on the motion's implications.

== Personal life ==
He is the brother of writer and television presenter Ciara Ní É.

| Dáil | Election | Deputy (Party) | Deputy (Party) | Deputy (Party) | Deputy (Party) | Deputy (Party) |
|---|---|---|---|---|---|---|
| 32nd | 2016 | Denise Mitchell (SF) | Tommy Broughan (I4C) | Finian McGrath (Ind.) | Seán Haughey (FF) | Richard Bruton (FG) |
| 33rd | 2020 | Denise Mitchell (SF) | Cian O'Callaghan (SD) | Aodhán Ó Ríordáin (Lab) | Seán Haughey (FF) | Richard Bruton (FG) |
| 34th | 2024 | Denise Mitchell (SF) | Cian O'Callaghan (SD) | Barry Heneghan (Ind.) | Tom Brabazon (FF) | Naoise Ó Muirí (FG) |
