= Dublin Bay North =

Dáil constituency (2016–present)

- Dáil constituency
- Location of Dublin Bay North within County Dublin
- Interactive map of constituency boundaries since the 2024 general election
- Major settlements: Artane; Baldoyle; Beaumont; Clontarf; Coolock; Fairview; Howth; Kilbarrack; Raheny; Sutton

Current constituency
- Created: 2016
- Seats: 5
- TDs: Tom Brabazon (FF); Barry Heneghan (Ind); Denise Mitchell (SF); Cian O'Callaghan (SD); Naoise Ó Muirí (FG)
- Local government areas: Dublin City; Fingal
- EP constituency: Dublin

Dublin Bay North is a parliamentary constituency that has been represented in Dáil Éireann, the lower house of the Irish parliament or Oireachtas, since the 2016 general election. The constituency elects five deputies (Teachtaí Dála, commonly known as TDs). The method of election is proportional representation by means of the single transferable vote (PR-STV).

== History and boundaries ==
The Constituency Commission proposed in its 2012 report that at the next general election a new constituency called Dublin Bay North be created. The report proposed changes to the constituencies of Ireland so as to reduce the total number of TDs from 166 to 158.

The constituency was established by the Electoral (Amendment) (Dáil Constituencies) Act 2013. It incorporated the entirety of Dublin North-Central and most of Dublin North-East; with the transfer of an area around the village of Portmarnock from Dublin North-East into Dublin Fingal.

The Constituency Review Report 2023 of the Electoral Commission recommended that at the next general election Dublin Bay North be altered by the transfer of territory from Dublin Fingal and the transfer of territory to Dublin North-West.

The Electoral (Amendment) Act 2023 defines the constituency as:

"In the city of Dublin, the electoral divisions of:

Ayrfield, Beaumont C, Beaumont D, Beaumont E, Clontarf East A, Clontarf East B, Clontarf East C, Clontarf East D, Clontarf East E, Clontarf West A, Clontarf West B, Clontarf West C, Clontarf West D, Clontarf West E, Edenmore, Grace Park, Grange A, Grange B, Grange C, Grange D, Grange E, Harmonstown A, Harmonstown B, Kilmore B, Kilmore C, Kilmore D, Priorswood A, Priorswood B, Priorswood C, Priorswood D, Priorswood E, Raheny-Foxfield, Raheny-Greendale, Raheny-St. Assam;

and, in the county of Fingal, the electoral divisions of:

Baldoyle, Balgriffin, Howth, Sutton.

== TDs ==
Teachtaí Dála (TDs) for Dublin Bay North 2016–
Key to parties: FF = Fianna Fáil; FG = Fine Gael; Lab = Labour; Ind. = Independent; I4C = Inds. 4 Change; SF = Sinn Féin; SD = Social Democrats
Dáil	Election	Deputy (Party)	Deputy (Party)	Deputy (Party)	Deputy (Party)	Deputy (Party)
32nd	2016	Denise Mitchell (SF)	Tommy Broughan (I4C)	Finian McGrath (Ind.)	Seán Haughey (FF)	Richard Bruton (FG)
33rd	2020	Denise Mitchell (SF)	Cian O'Callaghan (SD)	Aodhán Ó Ríordáin (Lab)	Seán Haughey (FF)	Richard Bruton (FG)
34th	2024	Denise Mitchell (SF)	Cian O'Callaghan (SD)	Barry Heneghan (Ind.)	Tom Brabazon (FF)	Naoise Ó Muirí (FG)

Note: The columns in this table are used only for presentational purposes, and no significance should be attached to the order of columns. For details of the order in which seats were won at each election, see the detailed results of that election.

== Elections ==
*: Outgoing TD

=== 2024 general election ===
2024 general election: Dublin Bay North
Party	Candidate	FPv%	Count													
Party	Candidate	FPv%	1	2	3	4	5	6	7	8	9	10	11	12	13	14
Social Democrats	Cian O'Callaghan	14.9	9,738	9,756	9,759	9,770	9,797	10,104	10,824	11,908						
Sinn Féin	Denise Mitchell	13.7	9,012	9,041	9,080	9,138	9,213	9,574	9,611	10,065	10,410	10,640	11,042			
Fianna Fáil	Tom Brabazon	10.5	6,854	6,869	6,875	6,898	6,930	7,006	7,080	7,116	7,125	7,228	7,522	7,938	8,423	8,919
Fine Gael	Naoise Ó Muirí	9.1	5,955	5,960	5,960	5,962	5,966	5,981	6,141	6,167	6,191	6,213	6,438	7,008	7,115	11,574
Fianna Fáil	Deirdre Heney	8.4	5,509	5,517	5,519	5,527	5,536	5,569	5,707	5,753	5,761	5,827	6,088	6,648	6,801	7,612
Fine Gael	Aoibhinn Tormey	8.1	5,313	5,323	5,325	5,327	5,334	5,363	5,535	5,561	5,577	5,617	5,733	6,246	6,347	
Sinn Féin	Mícheál Mac Donncha	5.9	3,892	3,911	3,920	3,943	3,991	4,136	4,166	4,370	4,483	4,608	4,860	5,364		
Independent	Barry Heneghan	5.5	3,602	3,655	3,686	3,748	3,880	4,116	4,210	4,400	4,524	5,309	6,213	7,192	8,920	9,203
Labour	Shane Folan	4.5	2,921	2,930	2,943	2,947	2,971	3,046	3,529	3,701	3,983	4,074	4,234			
Aontú	James Morris	3.8	2,460	2,554	2,569	2,636	2,932	3,037	3,064	3,147	3,177	3,691				
Green	David Healy	3.2	2,107	2,111	2,114	2,120	2,130	2,161								
PBP–Solidarity	Bernard Mulvany (Note: Mulvany is a member of People Before Profit.)	3.1	2,046	2,068	2,078	2,096	2,134	2,453	2,531							
Independent Left	John Lyons (Note: Independent Left is an unregistered political party, so Lyons appears on the ballot as non-party.)	2.8	1,829	1,873	1,919	2,009	2,122									
Independent	Michael Burke	2.1	1,379	1,457	1,595	1,865	2,385	2,605	2,616	2,695	2,723					
Irish Freedom	Paul Fitzsimons	1.7	1,116	1,161	1,273	1,469										
Independent	Brian Garrigan	1.1	747	785	917											
Independent	Kevin Coyle (Note: Affiliated with the National Alliance.)	0.8	547	581												
Independent	Jamie McGlue	0.4	252													
Independent	Diarmaid Ó Conoráin	0.3	185													
Independent	Stephen Doyle	0.2	104													
Electorate: 110,574 Valid: 65,568 Spoilt: 524 Quota: 10,929 Turnout: 59.8%

=== 2020 general election ===
2020 general election: Dublin Bay North
Party	Candidate	FPv%	Count													
Party	Candidate	FPv%	1	2	3	4	5	6	7	8	9	10	11	12	13	14
Sinn Féin	Denise Mitchell	29.8	21,344													
Fine Gael	Richard Bruton	15.6	11,156	11,315	11,334	11,388	11,419	11,442	11,485	11,522	11,542	13,367				
Labour	Aodhán Ó Ríordáin	11.3	8,127	8,736	8,765	8,795	8,833	8,862	8,927	8,989	9,091	9,251	9,727	10,312	10,735	11,283
Fianna Fáil	Seán Haughey	9.3	6,651	7,012	7,026	7,068	7,111	7,159	7,367	7,506	7,561	7,607	7,796	10,575	10,697	10,955
Social Democrats	Cian O'Callaghan	8.7	6,229	7,420	7,443	7,541	7,581	7,611	7,699	7,805	8,184	8,281	8,463	8,732	10,157	12,438
Green	David Healy	7.0	5,042	5,715	5,728	5,778	5,822	5,873	6,005	6,149	6,227	6,305	6,645	7,008	7,597	8,527
Fianna Fáil	Deirdre Heney	5.1	3,643	3,804	3,822	3,844	3,857	3,878	4,051	4,175	4,193	4,303	4,521			
Fine Gael	Catherine Noone	3.2	2,279	2,341	2,354	2,366	2,376	2,381	2,389	2,405	2,412					
Independent Left	John Lyons (Note: Independent Left is an unregistered political party, so Lyons appeared on the ballot as non-party.)	2.6	1,882	3,705	3,792	3,824	3,893	4,074	4,125	4,601	4,975	4,986	5,004	5,096	6,421	
Solidarity–PBP	Bernard Mulvany (Note: Mulvany was a member of People Before Profit.)	2.0	1,409	3,369	3,398	3,416	3,444	3,488	3,528	3,708	4,637	4,671	4,680	4,759		
Aontú	Proinsias O'Conarain	1.4	973	1,092	1,106	1,110	1,132	1,174								
Irish Freedom	Ben Gilroy	1.1	771	1,274	1,283	1,293	1,351	1,532	1,759							
Solidarity–PBP	Michael O'Brien (Note: O'Brien was a member of Solidarity.)	1.0	722	1,915	1,935	1,945	1,968	1,995	2,037	2,163						
Independent	Conor Creaven	0.6	418	481	487											
Independent	Brian Garrigan	0.5	372	529	551	588										
Independent	Michael Burke	0.5	370	602	623	657	779									
Independent	Linda McEvoy	0.3	202	326												
Independent	Sean O'Leary	0.0	16	35												
Electorate: 112,047 Valid: 71,606 Spoilt: 645 (0.9%) Quota: 11,935 Turnout: 72,251 (64.5%)

Aodhán Ó Ríordáin vacated his seat on taking his seat in the European Parliament on 16 July 2024 following his election for Dublin at the 2024 European Parliament election. The seat remained vacant until the dissolution of the 33rd Dáil on 8 November 2024.

=== 2016 general election ===
The constituency was dubbed the "group of death" by media because of the large number and high profile of candidates, the close contest, and the protracted nature of the count.

2016 general election: Dublin Bay North
Party	Candidate	FPv%	Count														
Party	Candidate	FPv%	1	2	3	4	5	6	7	8	9	10	11	12	13	14	15
Fine Gael	Richard Bruton	13.3	9,792	9,804	9,860	9,924	9,934	10,568	10,578	13,092							
Fianna Fáil	Seán Haughey	10.9	8,007	8,029	8,094	8,123	8,157	8,189	8,232	8,293	8,345	9,311	9,378	11,659	11,956	12,754	
Independent	Finian McGrath	8.0	5,878	5,913	5,990	6,075	6,150	6,213	6,321	6,396	6,450	6,828	6,930	7,353	8,069	9,553	11,191
Labour	Aodhán Ó Ríordáin	7.7	5,675	5,683	5,701	5,920	5,932	6,183	6,201	6,581	7,057	7,299	7,320	7,544	8,547	9,947	10,329
Inds. 4 Change	Tommy Broughan	7.3	5,361	5,398	5,511	5,578	5,778	5,856	6,038	6,065	6,099	6,583	6,823	7,003	7,735	9,477	11,565
Sinn Féin	Denise Mitchell	6.8	5,039	5,051	5,067	5,081	5,247	5,255	5,510	5,515	5,517	5,573	8,281	8,386	8,596	9,047	11,348
Independent	Averil Power	6.7	4,911	4,934	5,052	5,145	5,294	5,529	5,678	5,768	5,828	6,237	6,338	6,674	7,668		
AAA–PBP	John Lyons	6.0	4,409	4,455	4,532	4,600	4,981	5,002	6,475	6,494	6,497	6,682	7,116	7,209	7,760	8,476	
Social Democrats	Cian O'Callaghan	5.2	3,864	3,875	3,909	4,093	4,128	4,179	4,291	4,313	4,347	4,587	4,637	4,796			
Sinn Féin	Mícheál Mac Donncha	4.8	3,527	3,540	3,563	3,576	3,663	3,668	3,787	3,790	3,791	3,850					
Fianna Fáil	Deirdre Heney	4.6	3,360	3,376	3,408	3,448	3,458	3,498	3,514	3,577	3,619	3,943	3,974				
Renua	Terence Flanagan	4.4	3,205	3,273	3,302	3,348	3,372	3,418	3,462	3,525	3,588						
Fine Gael	Naoise Ó Muirí	3.9	2,868	2,870	2,875	2,905	2,908	3,376	3,381								
AAA–PBP	Michael O'Brien	3.0	2,236	2,253	2,271	2,282	2,559	2,562									
Fine Gael	Stephanie Regan	2.5	1,857	1,865	1,883	1,939	1,957										
Independent	Damien O'Neill	2.0	1,446	1,470	1,506	1,517											
Green	Donna Cooney	1.4	1,024	1,038	1,055												
Independent	Jimmy Guerin	1.0	756	782													
Independent	Paul Clarke	0.4	306														
Independent	Proinsias Ó Conaráin	0.1	104														
Electorate: 109,516 Valid: 73,625 Spoilt: 709 (1.0%) Quota: 12,271 Turnout: 74,334 (67.9%)

== See also ==
- Elections in the Republic of Ireland
- Politics of the Republic of Ireland
- List of Dáil by-elections
- List of political parties in the Republic of Ireland
