= Ciara Ní É =

Irish poet, playwright, screenwriter and broadcaster

- Born: Clontarf, Dublin, Ireland
- Occupations: Broadcaster, writer
- Known for: Bilingual poet
- Relatives: Barry Heneghan (brother)

Ciara Ní É is an Irish poet, playwright, screenwriter and broadcaster who often works through the Irish language. She is the founder of the bilingual spoken-word event REIC and co-founder with Eoin McEvoy of the LGBTQ+ arts collective AerachAiteachGaelach. Her work has been published in anthologies including Bone and Marrow/Cnámh agus Smior (Wake Forest University Press, 2022), Queering the Green (Lighthouse Press, 2021), and Washing Windows Too (Arlen House, 2022). She has performed widely in Ireland and internationally, with appearances at festivals and venues in New York, London, Berlin, Paris, and Stockholm. Ní É was named on the Irish Examiner’s list of "100 Women Changing Ireland" (2022). Her broadcasting work includes the TG4 documentary Ciara Ní É: Saol Trí Ghaeilge (2021), which was shortlisted for the Celtic Media Festival and Oireachtas Media Awards.

== Early life and education ==
Ní É grew up in Clontarf, Dublin, and is one of five children. She studied English Literature and Modern Irish at Trinity College Dublin, graduating in 2013. She later completed a master’s degree in Scríobh agus Cumarsáid na Gaeilge at University College Dublin in 2015. In 2017–18 she taught Irish at Villanova University in Pennsylvania as a Fulbright scholar.

== Career ==
=== Poetry and performance ===
Ní É is the founder and host of REIC, a bilingual spoken-word and open mic night established in 2015 during her MA studies. REIC has featured poets, musicians, and spoken-word performers in both Irish and English, and has been covered by RTÉ and TG4. FísDánta (video poems) produced by REIC in association with the Irish Writers Centre in 2018 have been studied at the University of Limerick, Dublin City University, and the University of Connecticut. In 2025 a second series of FísDánta with the Irish Writers Centre was announced.

Her work has been published in journals including Aneas, Impossible Archetype and Comhar, and in anthologies such as Impressions irlandaises - 23 poétesses racontent leur pays (Castor Astral, 2024) Bone and Marrow/Cnámh agus Smior (Wake Forest University Press, 2022), Queering the Green (Lighthouse Press, 2021), and Washing Windows Too (Arlen House, 2022). She features regularly at festivals across Ireland including the Dublin Fringe Festival, Listowel Writers’ Week, Cúirt International Festival of Literature, and Electric Picnic, and has performed internationally including in New York, London, Berlin, Paris and Stockholm.

=== Theatre and screenwriting ===
Ní É co-wrote and performed in Grindr, Saghdar & Cher (2022), supported by Oireachtas na Gaeilge, which had a national tour and was staged at Galway International Arts Festival and Outburst Arts Festival in Belfast. She co-created Idir Mise agus Craiceann do Chluaise with Eoin McEvoy, produced at the Dublin Fringe Festival in 2021, She wrote and directed the bilingual short film Claonadh (2024), the script of which won the Físín short film competition. Claonadh premiered at the Galway Film Fleadh.

=== Collectives and community work ===
In 2020, Ní É co-founded AerachAiteachGaelach with Eoin McEvoy, a queer Irish language arts collective working through Irish, which has curated and produced events at the Dublin Fringe Festival, the Abbey Theatre, the International Literature Festival Dublin.

=== Broadcasting and media ===
Ní É created the YouTube series What the Focal!? in 2017, exploring the Irish language in short, accessible videos. A companion podcast of the same name was launched in 2022. In 2021 she presented the TG4 documentary Ciara Ní É: Saol Trí Ghaeilge, which was shortlisted at the Celtic Media Festival and the Oireachtas Media Awards. She has also contributed to RTÉ and BBC Radio programmes, and her work has been covered in The Guardian and The Sunday Business Post.

== Residencies ==
Ní É has held artistic residencies at Dublin City University (2020), University College Dublin (2023). and the Dublin Fringe Festival (2022) and participated in the Abbey Theatre’s 5x5 development programme (2020). In 2024 she undertook a one-month residency at Literarisches Colloquium Berlin, supported by Literature Ireland.

== Recognition ==
Ní É was named among the Irish Examiner’s "100 Women Changing Ireland" in 2022. She won the Comórtas Físín short film fund in 2022, and was awarded first place in the Liú Lúnasa Irish Language Poetry Slam in 2024. In 2017 she was selected for Poetry Ireland’s Introductions Series.

== Publications ==
- Impressions irlandaises – 23 poétesses racontent leur pays (Castor Astral, 2025)

- Bone and Marrow/Cnámh agus Smior (Wake Forest University Press, 2022)
- Queering the Green (Lighthouse Press, 2021)
- Washing Windows Too (Arlen House, 2022)
- Meascra ón Aer (Cóiscéim, 2020)

== Personal life ==
Ní É is based in Dublin. She is an ambassador for the Irish Writers Centre.
