= 2004 Fingal County Council election =

2004 Irish local government election

← 1999	11 June 2004	2009 →

All 24 seats to Fingal County Council
	First party	Second party	Third party
Party	Labour	Fine Gael	Fianna Fáil
Seats won	6	5	4
Seat change	0	0	-2
	Fourth party	Fifth party	Sixth party
Party	Green	Socialist Party	Progressive Democrats
Seats won	3	2	1
Seat change	+2	0	0
	Seventh party	Eighth party
Party	Sinn Féin	Independent
Seats won	1	2
Seat change	+1	-1
- Map showing the area of Fingal County Council
Council control after election
TBD

An election to Fingal County Council took place on 11 June 2004 as part of that year's Irish local elections. 24 councillors were elected from six local electoral areas (LEAs) for a five-year term of office on the electoral system of proportional representation by means of the single transferable vote (PR-STV).

== Results by party ==
Party	Seats	±	First Pref. votes	FPv%	±%
Labour	6	0	14,654	17.92	
Fine Gael	5	0	17,641	21.57	
Fianna Fáil	4	-2	16,817	20.56	
Green	3	+2	6,423	7.85	
Socialist Party	2	0	6,978	8.53	
Progressive Democrats	1	0	4,687	5.73	
Sinn Féin	1	+1	4,075	4.98	
Independent	2	-1	6,434	7.87	
Totals	24	0	81,784	100.00	—

== Results by local electoral area ==
=== Balbriggan ===
Balbriggan - 4 seats
Party	Candidate	FPv%	Count											
Party	Candidate	FPv%	1	2	3	4	5	6	7	8	9	10	11	12
Independent	David O'Connor*	11.93	1,708	1,727	1,768	1,792	1,834	1,968	2,005	2,105	2,174	2,253	2,405	2,592
Green	Joe Corr	10.20	1,460	1,482	1,523	1,564	1,655	1,670	1,719	1,782	1,985	2,154	2,248	2,526
Fine Gael	Tom O'Leary*	9.63	1,378	1,391	1,402	1,488	1,494	1,507	1,521	1,555	1,598	1,854	1,937	
Fianna Fáil	Dermot Murray*	8.31	1,190	1,193	1,195	1,206	1,218	1,318	1,376	1,503	1,515	1,659		
Labour	Ciaran Byrne*	8.30	1,188	1,198	1,213	1,260	1,309	1,323	1,439	1,472	1,770	1,948	2,027	2,628
Fianna Fáil	Liam Butterly	8.28	1,185	1,212	1,276	1,298	1,305	1,420	1,430	1,466	1,677	1,716	2,115	2,306
Independent	May McKeon	7.70	1,102	1,104	1,131	1,157	1,226	1,240	1,425	1,662	1,692	1,962	2,440	2,570
Fine Gael	Seán Brown	7.10	1,017	1,026	1,040	1,052	1,082	1,102	1,139	1,295	1,343			
Labour	Kevin Thorp	5.81	831	859	912	931	954	956	1,027	1,043				
Progressive Democrats	Gerry Gaughan	5.63	806	812	822	835	852	867	924					
Labour	Monica Harford	4.16	596	598	608	625	679	699						
Fianna Fáil	Stephanie Davis-O'Brien	3.43	491	494	497	504	509							
Socialist Party	Tadhg Kenahan	3.20	458	460	468	481								
Independent	Tommy Ryan	2.63	377	382	404									
Independent	James Archer	2.10	300	355										
Independent	Paddy Boyle	1.59	227											
Electorate: 21,725 Valid: 14,314 (55.03%) Spoilt: 348 Quota: 2,863 Turnout: 14,662 (56.37%)

=== Castleknock ===
Castleknock - 4 seats
Party	Candidate	FPv%	Count					
Party	Candidate	FPv%	1	2	3	4	5	6
Fine Gael	Leo Varadkar*	38.20	4,894					
Labour	Peggy Hamill*	12.13	1,554	2,235	2,348	2,449	2,749	
Fianna Fáil	Brenda Clifford	11.31	1,449	1,733	1,791	1,866	1,916	2,082
Progressive Democrats	Mags Murray	10.05	1,288	1,817	1,903	1,951	2,034	2,439
Fianna Fáil	Marian Quinlan	9.93	1,272	1,504	1,544	1,609	1,646	1,766
Green	Roderic O'Gorman	5.20	666	944	1,054	1,187	1,434	
Socialist Party	Susan Fitzgerald	5.16	661	758	794	934		
Sinn Féin	Luke Stynes	4.64	594	674	703			
Independent	Fergal Molloy	3.38	433	583				
Electorate: 23,677 Valid: 12,811 (54.11%) Spoilt: 249 Quota: 2,563 Turnout: 13,060 (55.16%)

=== Howth ===
Howth - 3 seats
Party	Candidate	FPv%	Count							
Party	Candidate	FPv%	1	2	3	4	5	6	7	8
Fine Gael	Joan Maher*	25.78	2,612							
Fine Gael	Michael Joe Cosgrave*	15.33	1,553	1,600	1,631	1,744	1,815	1,959	2,166	2,386
Green	David Healy	12.26	1,242	1,271	1,281	1,379	1,509	1,761	1,919	2,562
Fianna Fáil	Liam Creaven*	9.80	993	1,059	1,065	1,124	1,162	1,184	1,716	1,781
Socialist Party	Brian Greene	8.04	815	846	851	868	1,023	1,214	1,277	
Fianna Fáil	Geraldine Wall	8.02	812	898	907	1,057	1,104	1,169		
Labour	Vivienne Kelly	6.59	668	681	688	742	804			
Sinn Féin	Bernie Quinn	5.69	576	598	600	610				
Progressive Democrats	Noelle Ryan	5.16	523	543	552					
Fianna Fáil	Brian Geoghegan	3.33	337							
Electorate: 17,708 Valid: 10,131 (57.21%) Spoilt: 212 Quota: 2,533 Turnout: 10,343 (58.41%)

=== Malahide ===
Malahide - 4 seats
Party	Candidate	FPv%	Count				
Party	Candidate	FPv%	1	2	3	4	5
Labour	Peter Coyle*	33.61	3,958				
Fianna Fáil	Darragh O'Brien*	16.98	2,000	2,095	2,144	2,444	
Green	Robbie Kelly*	14.83	1,747	2,340	2,469		
Fianna Fáil	Barbara Foley	12.01	1,415	1,583	1,660	1,957	1,969
Fine Gael	Alan Farrell	8.24	971	1,139	1,642	2,080	2,140
Progressive Democrats	Nicola Byrne	8.93	1,052	1,308	1,410		
Fine Gael	Paul Cuddy	5.38	634	956			
Electorate: 21,109 Valid: 11,777 (55.79%) Spoilt: 318 Quota: 2,356 Turnout: 12,095 (57.30%)

=== Mulhuddart ===
Mulhuddart - 4 seats
Party	Candidate	FPv%	Count								
Party	Candidate	FPv%	1	2	3	4	5	6	7	8	9
Sinn Féin	Martin Christie	15.22	1,910	1,923	1,965	2,050	2,099	2,129	2,182	2,225	2,445
Socialist Party	Ruth Coppinger*	14.72	1,848	1,858	1,911	1,960	2,387	2,420	2,485	2,537	
Labour	Michael O'Donovan*	13.94	1,750	1,756	1,809	1,840	1,889	1,955	2,079	2,156	2,467
Fianna Fáil	Margaret Richardson*	10.17	1,277	1,284	1,291	1,311	1,324	1,375	1,436	1,940	2,161
Fine Gael	Jon Rainey*	8.58	1,077	1,081	1,097	1,102	1,107	1,213	1,578	1,755	1,887
Independent	Gerry Lynam*	7.55	948	989	1,018	1,083	1,113	1,179	1,249	1,323	
Fianna Fáil	Michael Smyth	7.23	908	910	919	922	930	1,069	1,115		
Fine Gael	Gary O'Connor	6.08	763	769	782	793	802	896			
Progressive Democrats	Ben Howe	4.87	611	614	653	659	668				
Socialist Party	Helen Redwood	4.84	607	610	628	656					
Green	Robert Bonnie	2.71	340	353							
Independent	Gerard Murray	2.42	304	393	412						
Independent	Paul Hand	1.67	209								
Electorate: 25,860 Valid: 12,552 (48.549%) Spoilt: 373 Quota: 2,511 Turnout: 12,925 (49.98%)

=== Swords ===
Swords - 5 seats
Party	Candidate	FPv%	Count										
Party	Candidate	FPv%	1	2	3	4	5	6	7	8	9	10	11
Socialist Party	Clare Daly*	16.51	2,763	2,783	2,815								
Fianna Fáil	Michael Kennedy*	13.54	2,266	2,293	2,359	2,389	2,413	2,496	2,613	2,735	3,505		
Labour	Gerry McGuire*	9.00	1,506	1,512	1,539	1,553	1,753	1,814	1,872	2,001	2,040	2,098	2,419
Labour	Ken Farrell	8.22	1,375	1,475	1,484	1,501	1,511	1,549	1,572	1,649	1,697	1,727	
Fine Gael	Anne Devitt*	7.45	1,246	1,277	1,324	1,337	1,394	1,740	1,814	1,871	2,070	2,204	2,408
Labour	Tom Kelleher*	7.34	1,228	1,231	1,262	1,300	1,321	1,398	1,551	1,697	1,810	1,891	2,408
Fianna Fáil	Martina Coombes	7.30	1,222	1,230	1,273	1,285	1,316	1,353	1,438	1,519			
Sinn Féin	Matt McCormack	5.95	995	1,001	1,012	1,091	1,101	1,118	1,239				
Green	Kenneth Duffy	5.79	968	988	1,033	1,089	1,143	1,221	1,353	1,588	1,713	1,800	1,992
Independent	Joe O'Neill	4.94	826	827	863	936	942	982					
Fine Gael	Sean Dolphin*	4.05	678	713	740	749	847						
Fine Gael	Bob Dowling	3.09	517	536	550	554							
Socialist Party	Michael O'Brien	2.59	433	433	441								
Progressive Democrats	Mary O'Donnell	2.43	407	421									
Fine Gael	Emer Kernan	1.80	301										
Electorate: 30,694 Valid: 16,731 (54.51%) Spoilt: 317 Quota: 2,789 Turnout: 17,048 (55.54%)
