= Denise Mitchell =

Irish politician (born 1976)

Denise Mitchell TD
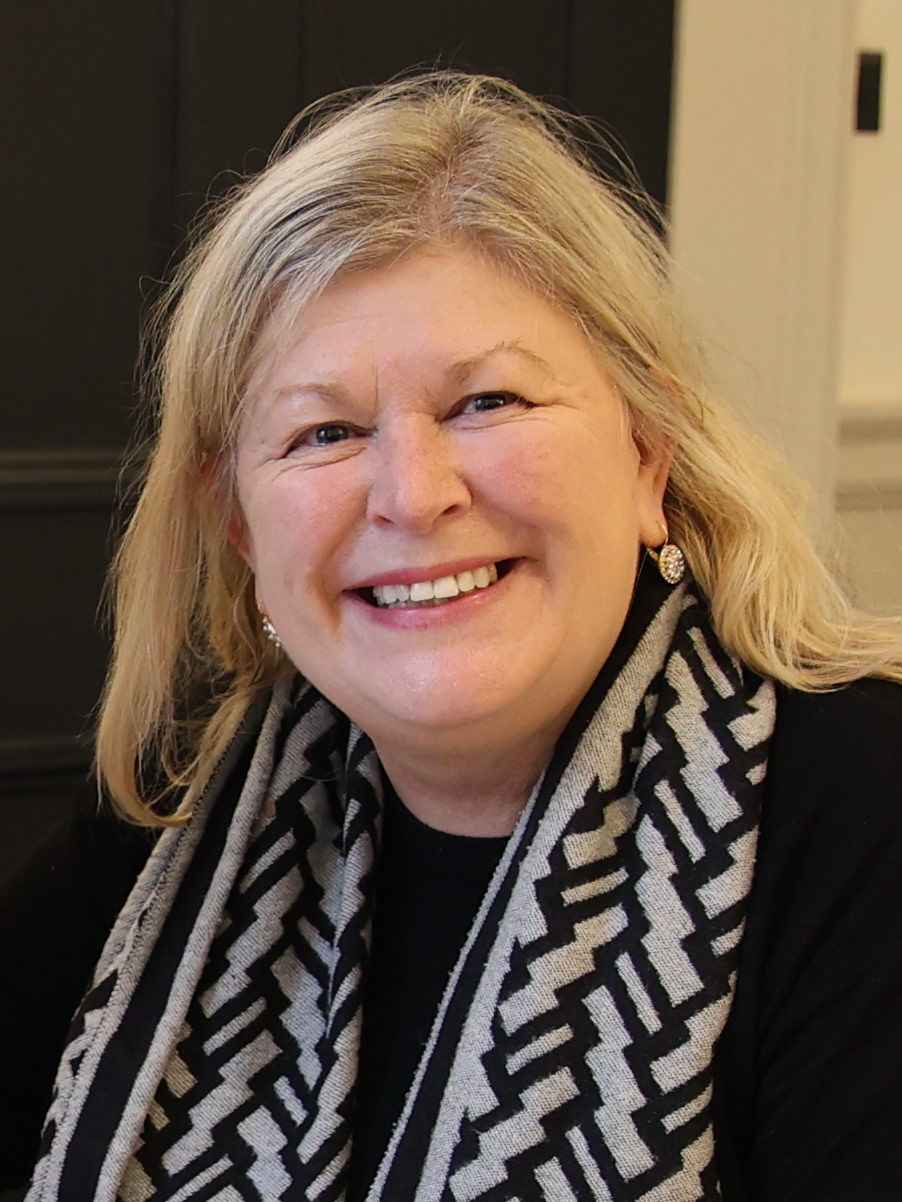
- Mitchell in 2024

Teachta Dála
- Incumbent
- Assumed office February 2016
- Constituency: Dublin Bay North

Personal details
- Born: 22 November 1976 (age 49) Coolock, Dublin, Ireland
- Party: Sinn Féin
- Spouse: Alan Moran (m. 2007)
- Children: 6

Denise Mitchell (born 22 November 1976) is an Irish Sinn Féin politician who has been a Teachta Dála (TD) for the Dublin Bay North constituency since the 2016 general election.

== Political career ==
Mitchell was first elected to Dublin City Council at the 2014 local elections representing the Beaumont-Donaghmede electoral area.

A well-known community activist locally, Mitchell is described as being a close ally to Sinn Féin leader Mary Lou McDonald. In 2016, she listed the campaign calling to Repeal the 8th amendment as a priority for her if elected to the Dáil.

In the 2016 general election, she took the fourth of five seats in the newly created Dublin Bay North constituency.

In the 2020 general election, she received the single highest vote of any candidate in the State, securing 21,344 first-preference votes and being elected on the first count.

At the 2024 general election, Mitchell was re-elected to the Dáil and is the only Dublin Bay North candidate to have been returned at each election since the constituency's creation in 2016.

She has served in various roles in the Sinn Féin team in Leinster House including as Children & Youth Affairs Spokesperson, Social Protection Spokesperson, Dublin Spokesperson and has served as Sinn Féin's Deputy Whip in Leinster House since 2016.

== Personal life ==
One of five children, Denise Mitchell was born in Sheriff Street before her family moved to Darndale where she grew up. Her father worked as a millhand while her mother was employed in the local Cadbury Ireland factory. Mitchell joined Sinn Féin in the early 1990s. She worked in a locally-based knitwear factory, Shamrock Apparel, where she served as a shop steward before also having careers with Motorola, Gateway 2000 and Brink's.

In 2014, she came to prominence as a local leader of the Right2Water movement protesting against the imposition of domestic water charges in Ireland, and during a rally in Ayrfield Community Centre she said it was important that no political party try to take over the movement.

She lives in Ayrfield, Coolock with her husband Alan and their six children.

Dáil	Election	Deputy (Party)	Deputy (Party)	Deputy (Party)	Deputy (Party)	Deputy (Party)
32nd	2016	Denise Mitchell (SF)	Tommy Broughan (I4C)	Finian McGrath (Ind.)	Seán Haughey (FF)	Richard Bruton (FG)
33rd	2020	Denise Mitchell (SF)	Cian O'Callaghan (SD)	Aodhán Ó Ríordáin (Lab)	Seán Haughey (FF)	Richard Bruton (FG)
34th	2024	Denise Mitchell (SF)	Cian O'Callaghan (SD)	Barry Heneghan (Ind.)	Tom Brabazon (FF)	Naoise Ó Muirí (FG)
