= Jimmy Guerin =

Irish local councillor

Councillor for Howth–Malahide
- Incumbent
- Assumed office 23 May 2014
- Parliamentary group: Independent
- Constituency: Howth–Malahide

Personal details
- Born: Dublin, Ireland
- Relatives: Veronica Guerin (sister)
- Occupation: Politician

Jimmy Guerin is an independent councillor for the Howth-Malahide local electoral area of Fingal County Council. He is also brother of the murdered Irish journalist Veronica Guerin.

== Elections ==
He ran as an independent candidate in the 2009 Fingal County Council election but was not elected. He ran in the 2011 Irish general election as an independent candidate in Dublin North-East but was not elected. In 2014 he was elected to Fingal County Council for the Howth-Malahide constituency. He ran in the 2016 general election as an independent constituent in Dublin Bay North but was not elected.

== Views ==
In 2016 he said that he feared that the Irish state might be losing the struggle against organised crime and that the Criminal Assets Bureau was not strong enough to defeat criminal organisations.

He condemned the murder of Lyra McKee as "an act of butchery" and also said "I don't think the term outrage is strong enough".

After the murder of Keane Mulready-Woods he called for the introduction of internment to deal with gangland crime.

== Defamation action against Gemma O'Doherty ==
In September 2019 independent councillor he took a defamation action against Gemma O'Doherty.

In August 2020 legal the High Court was told that Gemma O'Doherty had been "actively trying to evade" service of defamation proceedings brought against her by him. He claims that he was defamed in comments posted on Twitter and Facebook allegedly by Gemma O'Doherty. Attempts had been made to serve documents on her but they had not been successful.

His solicitors secured orders against Gemma O'Doherty including one that she had been formally served with the summons outlining the action against her after an ex parte hearing.
