= Tommy Broughan =

Irish politician (born 1947)

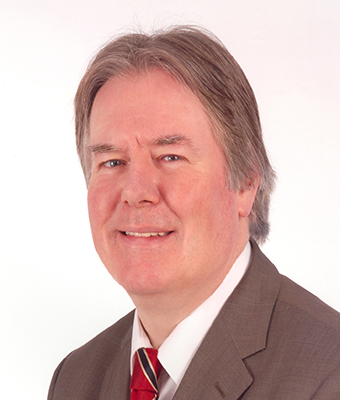
- Broughan in 2016

Teachta Dála
- In office February 2016 – February 2020
- Constituency: Dublin Bay North
- In office November 1992 – February 2016
- Constituency: Dublin North-East

Personal details
- Born: Thomas Broughan; 1 August 1947 (age 79) Dublin, Ireland
- Party: Independent (2016–2020)
- Other political affiliations: Independents 4 Change (2016); Independent (2011–2015); Labour Party (1991–2011)
- Education: University College Dublin; University of London

Thomas Broughan (born 1 August 1947) is an Irish former Independent politician who served as a Teachta Dála (TD) from 1992 to 2020.

He sat as a TD for the Labour Party until late 2011, representing the Dublin North-East constituency from 1992 until constituency changes for the 2016 general election.

== Early life ==
Broughan was born in Dublin in 1947. He was educated at Moyle Park College, Clondalkin, University College Dublin and University of London. He worked as a teacher at St. Aidan's CBS, Whitehall, before entering politics in 1991, when he was elected to Dublin City Council.

== Labour Party ==
The following year, Broughan was first elected to Dáil Éireann at the 1992 general election to the 27th Dáil as a Labour Party TD for Dublin North-East. He retained his seat at the 1997, 2002, 2007, 2011 and 2016 general elections.

Broughan previously served as Labour Party Spokesperson for Enterprise, Trade and Employment; Communications, Energy and Natural Resources; and Transport.

Broughan was regarded as being on the left-wing of the Labour Party. He first lost the party whip in 1994, during the Fianna Fáil-Labour Party coalition when he disagreed with the government decision to sell Team Aer Lingus, but he returned when that coalition collapsed at the end of 1994.

During Pat Rabbitte's leadership of the Labour party from 2002 to 2007, Broughan was a leading critic of Rabbitte's decision to form an electoral alliance with Fine Gael, instead advocating an independent strategy for the party, in addition to closer co-operation with the Green Party and Sinn Féin.

He had the Labour parliamentary party whip withdrawn on 29 June 2010, for failing to attend a vote on the Wildlife (Amendment) Bill 2010 in the Dáil. He along with fellow TD Joanna Tuffy both opposed the Labour Party going into coalition with Fine Gael in the aftermath of the 2011 general election.

During the 31st Dáil, he became increasingly critical of a number of government policies. In November 2011, he criticised Transport Minister Leo Varadkar's decision to defer the Dublin Metro, claiming it would have been a "huge boost" to economic growth and employment in the Dublin/Mid-Leinster region. He lost the parliamentary Labour Party whip after voting to reject a government amendment to extend the bank guarantee for another year on 1 December 2011. This was his third time to lose the Labour whip, having previously done so in 1994 and 2010. He stated he could not support adding more debt and called on Labour party TDs to join him on the opposition benches to oppose elements of the Government's economic policy.

== Social Democratic Union ==
In April 2014, it was reported that Broughan had left the Labour Party, was forming a "Social Democratic Union" for his constituency supporters, and hoped like-minded Independent TDs would join.

The group is unconnected to the Social Democrats, formed by Broughan's former Labour Party colleague Róisín Shortall along with two other Independent TDs. Broughan has ruled himself out of joining the new party stating he planned to remain an independent deputy. As of July 2015, the Social Democratic Union remains unregistered.

== 2016 general election ==
At the 2016 general election, he stood as an Independents 4 Change candidate in the Dublin Bay North constituency. He was re-elected to the Dáil. He voted for Richard Boyd Barrett for Taoiseach when the 32nd Dáil first met.

Broughan left the party on 26 July 2016.

On 22 January 2020, he announced that he would not be contesting the 2020 general election.

Dáil	Election	Deputy (Party)	Deputy (Party)	Deputy (Party)	Deputy (Party)	Deputy (Party)
9th	1937	Alfie Byrne (Ind.)	Oscar Traynor (FF)	James Larkin (Ind.)	3 seats 1937–1948	
10th	1938	Alfie Byrne (Ind.)	Oscar Traynor (FF)	Richard Mulcahy (FG)	3 seats 1937–1948	
11th	1943	Alfie Byrne (Ind.)	Oscar Traynor (FF)	James Larkin (Lab)	3 seats 1937–1948	
12th	1944	Alfie Byrne (Ind.)	Oscar Traynor (FF)	Harry Colley (FF)	3 seats 1937–1948	
13th	1948	Alfie Byrne (Ind.)	Oscar Traynor (FF)	Harry Colley (FF)	Jack Belton (FG)	Peadar Cowan (CnaP)
14th	1951	Alfie Byrne (Ind.)	Oscar Traynor (FF)	Harry Colley (FF)	Jack Belton (FG)	Peadar Cowan (Ind.)
15th	1954	Alfie Byrne (Ind.)	Oscar Traynor (FF)	Harry Colley (FF)	Jack Belton (FG)	Denis Larkin (Lab)
15th	1956 by-election	Patrick Byrne (FG)	Oscar Traynor (FF)	Harry Colley (FF)	Jack Belton (FG)	Denis Larkin (Lab)
16th	1957	Patrick Byrne (FG)	Oscar Traynor (FF)	Charles Haughey (FF)	Jack Belton (FG)	Denis Larkin (Lab)
17th	1961	Patrick Byrne (FG)	George Colley (FF)	Charles Haughey (FF)	Jack Belton (FG)	Eugene Timmons (FF)
17th	1963 by-election	Patrick Byrne (FG)	George Colley (FF)	Charles Haughey (FF)	Paddy Belton (FG)	Eugene Timmons (FF)
18th	1965	Patrick Byrne (FG)	George Colley (FF)	Charles Haughey (FF)	Paddy Belton (FG)	Denis Larkin (Lab)
19th	1969	Conor Cruise O'Brien (Lab)	Eugene Timmons (FF)	Charles Haughey (FF)	Paddy Belton (FG)	4 seats 1969–1977
20th	1973	Conor Cruise O'Brien (Lab)	Eugene Timmons (FF)	Charles Haughey (FF)	Paddy Belton (FG)	4 seats 1969–1977
21st	1977	Constituency abolished				

Dáil	Election	Deputy (Party)	Deputy (Party)	Deputy (Party)	Deputy (Party)
22nd	1981	Michael Woods (FF)	Liam Fitzgerald (FF)	Seán Dublin Bay Rockall Loftus (Ind.)	Michael Joe Cosgrave (FG)
23rd	1982 (Feb)	Michael Woods (FF)	Maurice Manning (FG)	Ned Brennan (FF)	Michael Joe Cosgrave (FG)
24th	1982 (Nov)	Michael Woods (FF)	Maurice Manning (FG)	Liam Fitzgerald (FF)	Michael Joe Cosgrave (FG)
25th	1987	Michael Woods (FF)	Pat McCartan (WP)	Liam Fitzgerald (FF)	Michael Joe Cosgrave (FG)
26th	1989	Michael Woods (FF)	Pat McCartan (WP)	Liam Fitzgerald (FF)	Michael Joe Cosgrave (FG)
27th	1992	Michael Woods (FF)	Tommy Broughan (Lab)	Liam Fitzgerald (FF)	Seán Kenny (Lab)
28th	1997	Michael Woods (FF)	Tommy Broughan (Lab)	Martin Brady (FF)	Michael Joe Cosgrave (FG)
29th	2002	Michael Woods (FF)	Tommy Broughan (Lab)	Martin Brady (FF)	3 seats from 2002
30th	2007	Michael Woods (FF)	Tommy Broughan (Lab)	Terence Flanagan (FG)	3 seats from 2002
31st	2011	Seán Kenny (Lab)	Tommy Broughan (Lab)	Terence Flanagan (FG)	3 seats from 2002
32nd	2016	Constituency abolished. See Dublin Bay North			

Dáil	Election	Deputy (Party)	Deputy (Party)	Deputy (Party)	Deputy (Party)	Deputy (Party)
32nd	2016	Denise Mitchell (SF)	Tommy Broughan (I4C)	Finian McGrath (Ind.)	Seán Haughey (FF)	Richard Bruton (FG)
33rd	2020	Denise Mitchell (SF)	Cian O'Callaghan (SD)	Aodhán Ó Ríordáin (Lab)	Seán Haughey (FF)	Richard Bruton (FG)
34th	2024	Denise Mitchell (SF)	Cian O'Callaghan (SD)	Barry Heneghan (Ind.)	Tom Brabazon (FF)	Naoise Ó Muirí (FG)
