= Mags Murray =

Irish politician (1961–2020)

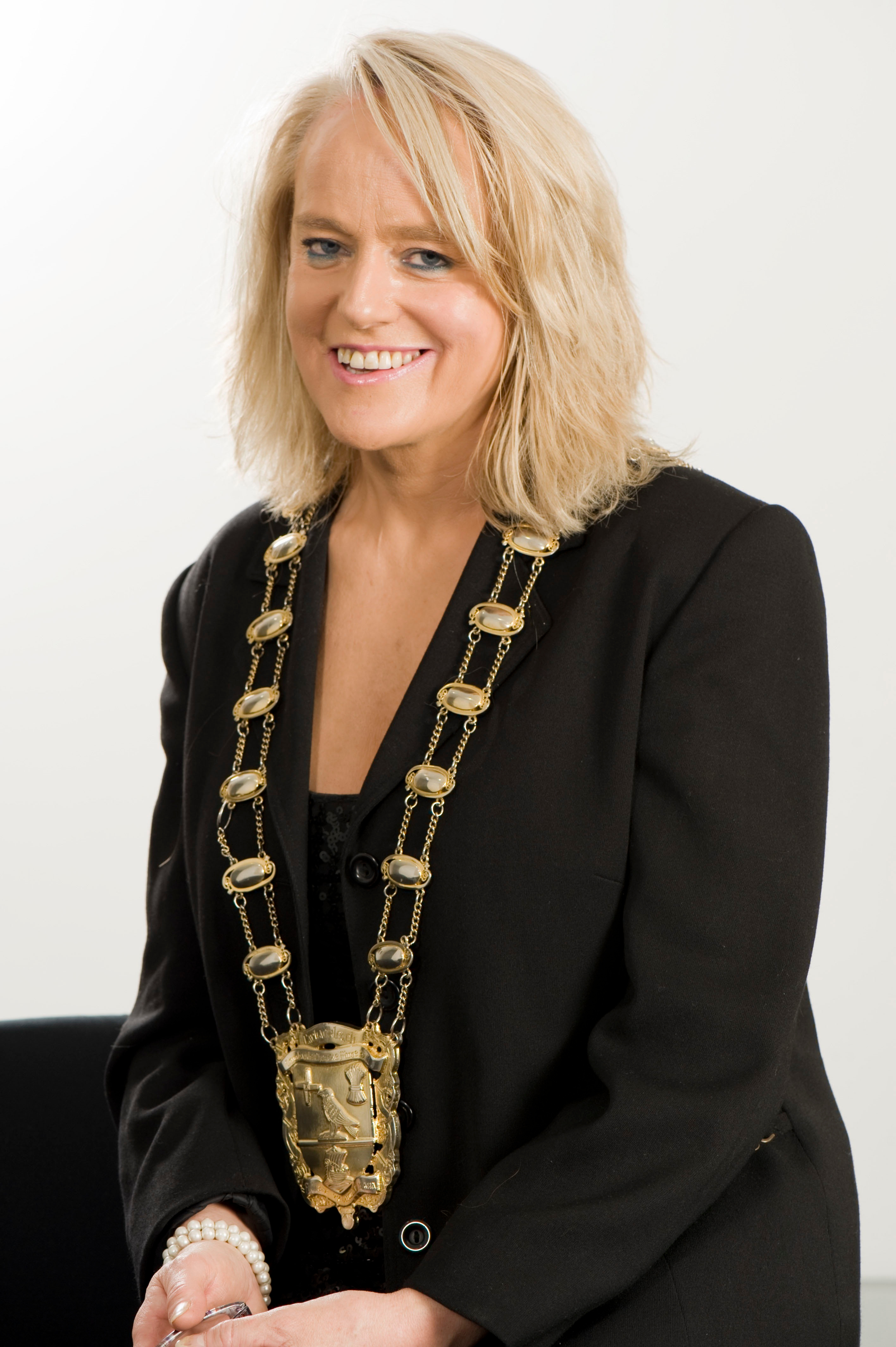
Mags Murray, Mayor of Fingal County Council, 2014–2015

Margaret Mary Murray (née O'Keeffe; 9 September 1961 – 13 June 2020) was an Irish Fianna Fáil politician, a member of Fingal County Council for the Castleknock Local Electoral Area and the mayor of Fingal County Council.

== Biography ==
Born in Cregane, Charleville, County Cork, she played camogie with the local camogie team, Ballyagran. Murray won an All-Ireland Senior Club Camogie Championship with her club in 1978, playing in the position of right wing forward. After moving to Dublin, Murray joined St Brigids GAA Club as a camogie player and also as a mentor.

Murray was elected at the 2004 local elections as a member of the Progressive Democrats. She was subsequently an unsuccessful candidate for the party at the 2007 Irish general election in Dublin West. After the Progressive Democrats became defunct she joined Fianna Fáil in February 2008. Murray was elected at the 2009 local elections, and retained her seat again at the 2014 local elections.

In June 2014, Murray was elected as the new Mayor of Fingal. A Fianna Fáil, Fine Gael and Labour Alliance, backed by a number of Independents, ensured the election of the Castleknock-based Councillor. She defeated three other nominees.

Murray hosted the 2015 Annual Mayors' Conference, entitled Immigration to Integration.

In February 2015, she described how a group of anti-water charge protesters blocked her exit from a council meeting for more than an hour, preventing her from getting to the hospital to see her sick daughter who was awaiting a liver transplant. Murray said that she had to suffer verbal abuse as well as being blocked into the council's car park late on Monday night.

Murray served as the first female president of the Local Authority Members Association for five years, from 2014 to 2019.
