= List of mayors of Cork =

The lord mayor of Cork is the head of Cork City Council and first citizen of Cork. The title was created in 1199 as provost of Cork and changed to mayor of Cork in 1273. It was elevated to lord mayor in 1900. The date of election is the beginning of June, and the term of office is one year. This is a list of provosts, mayors and lord mayors.

== Provosts of Cork ==
Year	Name
1199	John Despencer
1236	Walter Eynoff
1249	Elias Stakepole
1251	John Wenchedon
1252	Walter Wright
1272	Nick Morren

== Mayors of Cork ==
=== 13th century ===
Year	Name	Notes
1273	Richard Wine	
1274	Richard Lee	
1279	Walter Tardiff	
1281	Walter Rute	
1285	Peter Russell	
1287	William Pallard	
1290	Walter Tardiff	
1291	Walter O'Heyne	
1293	John Lavallin	

=== 14th century ===
Year	Name	Notes
1310	John Walters	
1311	William Bond	
1312	Nick Delaweily	
1313	William Hadevivre	
1314	Walter Dekerdiffe	
1315	Nick O'Heyne	
1316	John Deligre	
1317	Nick Delaweily	
1318	Adam Milksburry	
1319	Stephen Coppenger	
1320	Richard Deleyt	
1321	Ebra Destakenpoole	
1322	Walter Reith	
1323	Gilbert Monks	
1324	John Ledespasser	
1325	Nick Morraine	
1326	Edward Detalour	
1327	Roger Tryall	
1328	Roger Lebolout	
1329	William Albus	
1330	Nick Morraine	
1331	Richard Postwinid	
1332	Richard Lelegh	
1333	Richard Lelegh	
1334	Roger Leboulot	
1335	Bara Domontibus	
1336	John Wedlock	
1337	John Despenser	
1338	John de Bristol	
1339	John Fitz Abraham	
1340	Davide Demontius	
1341	Peter Rashall	
1342	Ebra Destakenpoole	
1343	Walter Reith	
1344	William Pallard	
1345	William Pallard	
1346	Walter Dekerdiffe	
1347	Walter Heyne	
1348	John Wallen	
1349	William Dewandspar	
1350	Walter Dekerdiffe	
1351	NickO'Heyne	
1352	Nick Delaoits	
1353	Walter Dekerdiffe	
1354	Pierce Wincent	
1355	John Gallenger	
1356	Walter Dekerdiffe	
1357	John Gallenger	
1358	Adam Ruth	
1359	Walter Dekerdiffe	
1360	Pierce Wincent	
1361	Pierce Wincent	
1362	William Droope	
1363	Adam Ruth	
1364	William Skiddy	
1365	William Skiddy	
1366	Pierce Wincent	
1367	William Skiddy	
1368	Jordan Kerdiffe	
1369	William Droope	
1370	John Leblown	
1371	John Leblown	
1372	Thomas Tith	
1373	William Droope	Probably the son of Walter Drop alias Droup.
1374	William Downane	
1375	Thomas Tith	
1376	William Droope	
1377	William Dondon	
1378	Thomas Tith	
1379	David Miagh	
1380	John Lombard	
1381	David Myah	
1382	Robert Drooper	
1383	John Myne	
1384	John Myne	
1385	John Myne	
1386	Robert Drooper	
1387	John Mably	
1388	John Mably	
1389	John Lombard	
1390	William Pollent	
1391	Redmond Kerwick	
1392	Andw. Stakepoole	
1393	Redmond Kerick	
1394	Robt. Flemming	
1395	Wm. Warriner	
1396	Thomas Honyboard	
1397	Thomas Burdeys	
1398	John Warriner	
1399	John Warriner	
1400	John Knapp	

=== 15th century ===
Year	Name	Notes
1401	Richard Lavalle	
1402	William Sughin	
1403	John Pennifleet	
1404	John Skiddy	
1405	John Signie	
1406	Wm. Sughin	
1407	John Weight	
1408	Wm. Sughin	
1409	Thos. Morden	
1410	John Worner	
1411	Thos. Morrough	
1412	Thos. Wordonton	
1413	Patk. Rice	
1414	Thos. Molenton	
1415	Robt. Garner	
1416	Robt. Garner	
1417	Robt. Garner	
1418	Robt. Garner	
1419	Thos. Molenton	
1420	Robt. Borderen	
1422	Thos. Molenton	
1423	Pierce Droop	
1424	Robt. Barner	
1425	David Landebook	
1426	Geof. White	
1427	David Landebook	
1428	Edward Dantsey	
1429	Godfrey Waile	
1430	Geof. Gallaway	
1431	Wm. Anasey	
1432	Wm. Anasey	
1433	Wm. Anasey	
1434	John Menia	
1435	Geof. White	
1436	John Morough	
1437	Godfrey Gallaway	
1438	John Morrough	
1439	John Skiddy	
1440	John Skiddy	
1441	John Meagh	
1442	John Morrough	
1443	Wm. Goold	
1444	Wm. Goold	
1445	John Morrough	
1446	John Goold	
1447	Richd. Skiddy	
1448	John Goold	
1449	Pat Gallaway	
1450	John Gallaway	
1451	Richd. Skiddy	
1452	John Goold	
1453	Richd. Skiddy	
1454	Wm. Gallaway	
1455	Richd. Skiddy	
1456	Richd. Lavallen	
1457	Wm. Gallaway	
1458	Richd. Skiddy	
1459	Wm. Skiddy	
1460	Pat Gallaway	
1461	Richd. Skiddy	
1462	John Gallaway	
1463	Wm. Goold	
1464	John Goold	
1465	John Skiddy	
1466	Richard Skiddy	
1467	John Meagh	
1468	Godfrey Noile	
1469	John Mezca	
1470	Richd. Skiddy	
1471	John Gallaway	
1472	Wm. Gallaway	
1473	Thos. Morrough	
1474	Wm. Skiddy	
1475	Richd. Lavallen	
1476	John Gallaway	
1477	Wm. Gallaway	
1478	Richd. Skiddy	
1479	Wm. Skiddy	
1480	Wm. Skiddy	
1481	Wm. Gallaway	
1482	Richd. Gallaway	
1483	Wm. Gallaway	
1484	Wm. Skiddy	
1485	Pat. Gallaway	
1486	Wm. Gallaway	
1487	Wm. Skiddy	
1488	Maur. Roche	
1489	Wm. Gallaway	
1490	John Walters	
1491	Maur. Roche	
1492	John Lavallen	
1493	Wm. Goold	
1494	John Walters	
1495	Thos. Coppenger	
1496	John Lavallen	
1497	Maur. Roche	
1498	John Lavallen	
1499	John Walters	
1500	Maur. Roche	

=== 16th century ===
Year	Name	Notes
1501	Wm. Goold	
1502	Wm. Gallaway	
1503	Edmd. Goold	
1504	John Gallaway	
1505	Wm. Terry	
1506	Wm. Skiddy	
1507	John Skiddy	
1508	Richd. Gallaway	
1509	Ed. Gallaway	
1510	Ed. Goold	
1511	Ed. Terry	
1512	John Gallaway	
1513	John Roch	
1514	E. Terry	
1515	Richard Skiddy	
1516	Walt. Gallaway	
1517	John Skiddy	
1518	Nick Skiddy	
1519	Pat Terry	
1520	Edm. Roch	
1521	David Terry	
1522	Richd. Goold	
1523	Maur. Roch	
1524	Ed. Goold	
1525	Wm. Terry	
1526	John Skiddy	
1527	Walter Gallaway	
1528	John Skiddy	
1529	Patk. Terry	
1530	Ed. Roch	
1531	Richd. Goold	
1532	Pat. Gallaway	
1533	Dom. Roch	
1534	Jas. Goold	
1535	Wm. Coppenger	
1536	Robt. Meagh	
1537	Thos. Ronane	
1538	Wm. Terry	
1539	Jas. Roch	
1540	Richd. Terry	
1541	Christ. Creagh	
1542	Wm. Sasfield	
1543	Wm. Skiddy	
1544	Jas. Goold	
1545	Richd. Goold	
1546	Wm. Goold	
1547	Wm. Goold	
1548	Robt. Meagh	
1549	Thos. Ronane	
1550	Dom. Roch	
1551	Wm. Terry	
1552	Jas. Roch	
1553	Pat Gallway	
1554	Richd. Terry	
1555	Christ. Creagh	
1556	Wm. Sasfield	
1557	Wm. Skiddy	
1558	Dom. Roch	
1559	Ed. Goold	
1560	Ed. Gallway	
1561	John Gallway	
1562	And. Gallway	
1563	Maur. Roch	
1564	Step. Coppenger	
1565	Rich. Roch	
1566	Wm. Gallway	
1567	Ed. Goold	
1568	John Gallway	
1569	Andrew Gallway	
1570	John Meagh	
1571	Maur. Roche	
1572	Step. Coppenger	
1573	John Walters	
1574	Wm. Terry	
1575	Jas. Ronane	
1576	Wm. Roch	
1577	John Goold	
1578	Walter Gallaway	
1579	Maur. Roche	
1580	Thos. Sasfield	
1581	Chris. Walters	
1582	Pat Gallway	
1583	Jas. Roch	
1584	Geo. Goold	
1585	Stephen Walters	
1586	Step. Terry	
1587	Robt. Coppenger	
1588	Ed. Terry	
1589	John Skiddy	
1590	Dom. Roch	
1591	David Terry	
1592	Henry Walsh	
1593	Pat. Gallway	
1594	Fra. Mortell	
1595	Jas. Meagh	
1596	Pat. Gallway	
1597	Geo. Goold	
1598	John Skiddy	
1599	Jas. Sasfield	
1600	Wm. Meade	
1601	John Meade	

=== 17th century ===
Year	Name	Notes
1602	John Coppinger	
1602	Thos. Sasfield	
1603	Thos. Sasfield	
1604	Ed. Terry	
1605	Robt. Coppinger	
1606	Wm. Sasfield	
1607	Philip Mortell	
1608	David Terry	
1609	Dom. Roch	
1610	Edmond Gallway	
1611	Geo.Goold	
1612	Dom. Tyrry	
1612	Dom. Gallwey	
1613	Wm. Skiddy	
1613	Patrick Tyrry	
1614	David Tyrry	
1614	Ed. Tyrry	
1615	Wm. Gold	
1616	John Coppinger	
1617	Patk. Tyrry	
1618	Wm. Gold	
1619	John Coppinger	
1620	Wm. Tirrie fitz Richard	
1621	Andrew Skiddie	
1622	John Coppinger, Jun.	
1623	John Roche	
1624	John Roche	
1625	Henry Gold fitz Adam	
1626	Elmond Martell fitz Philip	
1627	William Hore	
1628	David Tirrye fitz-Edmund	
1629	James Murroghe	
1630	Thomas Ronayne	
1631	Morrish Roche	
1644	Robert Coppinger	
1645	James Lombard	
1645–1655	Cromwellian Commonwealth	
1656	John Hodder	1st Mayor after the Act of Settlement that restored King Charles II of England
1657	William Hodder	
1658	Philip Mathews	
1659	Jonas Morris	
1660	Christopher Oliver	
1661	Walter Cooper	
1662	Richard Covert	First Mayor of Cork from the Huguenot community
1663	James Vandeleur	
1664	Richard Bassen	
1665	Nobler Dunscombe	
1666	Thomas Farren	
1667	Christopher Rye	
1668	Christopher Rye	
1669	Mathew Deane	
1670	James Finch	
1671	John Newenham	
1672	John Hawkins	
1673	Thomas Mills	
1674	John Bayley	
1675	George Wright	
1676	William Field	
1677	Timothy Tuckey	
1678	Thomas Kitchenman	
1679	John Bayley	
1680	Robert Rogers	
1681	William Alwin	
1682	Richard Covert	Second Term. His name is sometimes anglicised as Covett.
1683	John Wright	
1684	Edward Webber	
1685	Christopher Crofts	
1686	Edward Hoare	
1687	William Ballard	James II of England also appointed Ignatius Gold. Mayor in 1690 also.
1687	Ignatius Gold	For King James II. He and his family forfeited estates in Ireland after James loss. Last Catholic to hold the post until William Lyons.
1688	Patrick Roach	For King William
1689	Dominick Sarsfield	Fourth Viscount Sarsfield
1690	William Ballard	
1691	Mathew Deane	Baronet from Charleville, son served as an MP Cork as did his son.
1692	Daniel Crone	
1693	William Howell	
1694	Peter Renew	Huguenot also served as Sheriff in 1681. Surname originally Renieu.
1695	Samuel Love	Castle Saffron near Doneraile.
1696	James French	
1697	William Roberts	
1698	William Goddard	Mayor of the Staple of Cork
1699	Theo. Morris	
1700	John Sealy	

=== 18th century ===
Year	Name	Notes
1701	Simon Dring	Surname sometimes listed as Tiring.
1702	John Whiting	
1703	Edmund Knapp	Served as MP for Cork City, 1715–27
1704	William Andrews	Former Sheriff in 1698
1705	Francis Cotterel	Former Sheriff in 1700
1706	Bernard Poye	Former Sheriff in 1707
1707	Joseph Franklin	
1708	Row. Delahoyde	
1709	Noblet Rogers	Former Sheriff in 1706
1710	Edward Hoare	Former Sheriff in 1707 also served as MP for Cork City.
1711	Richard Philips	Former Sheriff
1712	Daniel Perdian	Huguenot also served as Sheriff in 1704. Surname originally Perdriau.
1713	John Allen	
1714	Edward Browne	
1715	Philip French	Previously served as a sheriff in 1712
1716	William Lambley	Previously served as a sheriff
1717	Abraham French	Previously served as a sheriff
1718	John Morley	Previously served as a sheriff
1719	John Terry	Previously served as a sheriff in 1711
1720	Joseph Lavit	Huguenot also served as Sheriff in 1713. Surname also spelled Lavite.
1721	William Hawkins	
1722	Daniel Pearse	
1723	Ed. Brockelsby	
1724	George Bennett	
1725	Ambrose Cremore	
1726	Robert Atkins	
1727	Thomas Browne	
1728	Hugh Millard	
1729	John Atkins	
1730	Joseph Austin	
1731	James Hulett	
1732	Samuel Croker	
1733	Thomas Pembroke	
1734	George Fuller	Freeman of cork, elected alderman 1727.
1735	Amb. Jackson	
1736	Thomas Farren	
1737	John Baldwin	
1738	Adam Newman	
1739	William Fuller	
1740	Harding Parker	
1741	Richard Bradshaw	
1742	William Owgans	
1743	Randall Westropp	
1744	William Winthrop	
1745	Walter Lavite	Huguenot son of Joseph, also served as Sheriff in 1733
1746	William Taylor	
1747	Hugh Millerd	
1748	Daniel Crone	
1749	William Holmes	
1750	Robert Wrixon	
1751	Will Busteed	
1752	Mathias Smith	
1753	Sir John Freke, 3rd Baronet	
1754	George Hodder	
1755	John Reilly	
1756	William Harding	
1757	Usher Philpott	
1758	John Swete	
1759	Phineas Barry	
1760	Joseph Witherall	
1761	Andrew Franklyn	
1762	John Wrixon	
1763	John Smith	
1764	Boyle Travers	
1765	Will Parkes	
1766	Samuel Maylor	
1767	James Chatterton	
1768	Noblett Phillips	
1769	Godfrey Baker	
1770	Christopher Collis	
1771	John Webb	
1772	John Roe	
1773	Samuel Rowland	
1774	John Travers	
1775	William Butler	
1776	Hugh Lawton	
1777	Thomas Owgan	
1778	Palms. Wastropp	
1779	John Harding	
1780	Fras. Carlton	
1781	Walter Travers	
1782	Sober Kent	
1783	Richard Kellett	
1784	James Morrison	
1785	(Sir) John Franklin	
1786	(Sir) Samuel Rowland	
1787	James Kingston	
1788	Richard Purcell	
1789	Henry Harding	died and replaced by Humphrey Crowley
1790	Richard Harris	
1791	Henry Puxley	
1792	John Shaw	
1793	William Wilcocks	Willcocks ran unsuccessfully in 1792 and moved to Upper Canada as a merchant before returning to becoming mayor.
1794	John Thompson	
1795	Jasper Lucas	
1796	(Sir) Vesian Pick	
1797	Kingsmill Berry	
1798	Philip Bennet	
1799	Michael Bunsteed	
1800	Philip Allen	

=== 19th century ===
Year	Name	Party	Notes
1801	Michael Robert Westropp		
1802	Michael Robert Westropp		Re-elected
1803	Richard Lane		
1804	Thomas Wagget		
1805	Charles Evanson		
1806	Rowland Morrison		
1807	John Day		
1808	Thomas Harding		
1809	John Foster		
1810	Noblett Johnson		
1811	Paul Maylor		
1812	Thomas Dorman		
1813	Peter Dumas		
1814	Sir David Perrier		
1815	Henry Sadlier		
1816	John George Newsom		
1817	Edward Allen		
1818	Thomas Gibbings		
1819	Richard Digby		
1820	Isaac Jones		
1821	Sir Anthony Perrier		Huguenot, noted for distillation method.
1822	Edward Newsom		
1823	Henry Bagnell		Merchant
1824	Bartholomew Gibbings		
1825	John N. Wrixon		
1826	Thomas Harrison		
1827	Richard N. Parker		
1828	Thomas Dunscombe		Blackrock Castle was rebuilt during his term
1829	Thomas Pope		
1830	George Knapp		
1831	Joseph Garde		
1832	John Besnard		Huguenot / Weaver
1833	Joseph Leycester	Conservative	
1834	Charles Perry		
1835	Andrew Spearing		
1836	Peter Besnard		Huguenot / Weaver
1837	John Saunders		
1838	John Bagnell		
1839	Lionel J. Westropp		
1840	James Lane		
1841	Juilius Besnard		Huguenot / Weaver
1842	Thomas Lyons		Merchant. First Catholic Mayor of Cork since 1688.
1843	Francis Beamish	Repeal Association	
1844	William Fagan	Repeal Association/Whig	
1845	Richard Dowden		
1846	Andrew F. Roche		
1847	Edward Hackett		Died in Office
1847	Andrew Roche		Replaced Hackett
1848	William Lyons		Father of Robert Spencer Dyer Lyons MP and physician.
1849	Sir William Lyons		Re-elected and knighted on royal visit.
1850	John Shea		
1851	James Lambkin		
1852	William Hackett		
1853	John Francis Maguire		Became an MP for Dungarvan then Cork City
1854	John N. Murphy		
1855	Sir John Gordon		
1856	William Fitzgibbon		
1857	William Fitzgibbon		
1858	Daniel Donegan		
1859	John Arnott	Liberal	Businessman born in Scotland, founder of the Arnotts department chain.
1860	Sir John Arnott	Liberal	
1861	Sir John Arnott	Liberal	Served as an MP for Kinsale
1862	John Francis Maguire	Liberal	Also an MP
1863	John Francis Maguire	Liberal	
1864	John Francis Maguire	Liberal	
1865	Charles J. Cantillon		
1866	Francis Lyons	Liberal	
1867	Francis Lyons	Liberal	
1868	Francis Lyons	Liberal	
1869	Daniel O'Sullivan		
1870	William Hegarty		
1871	John Daly	Home Rule League	
1872	John Daly	Irish Parliamentary Party	
1873	John Daly	Irish Parliamentary Party	
1874	Daniel A. Nagle		
1875	Daniel A. Nagle		
1876	George Penrose		Knighted
1877	Barry J. Sheehan		
1878	William V. Greeg		
1879	Patrick Kennedy		
1880	Patrick Kennedy		
1881	Sir Daniel V. O'Sullivan		Grandfather of Maureen O'Sullivan
1882	Daniel J. Galvin		
1883	Daniel J. Galvin		
1884	Daniel J. Galvin		Until June replaced
1884	Barry J. Sheehan		From June
1885	Paul J. Madden		
1886	Paul J. Madden		
1887	John O'Brien		
1888	John O'Brien		
1889	Daniel Ryan		
1890	Daniel Horgan	Irish National League	
1891	Daniel Horgan	Irish National League	Nationalist supported Charles Stewart Parnell in Irish Parliamentary Party split
1892	Daniel Horgan	Irish National League	
1893	Augustine Roche	Irish Parliamentary Party	Supported Parnell in split
1894	Augustine Roche	Irish Parliamentary Party	
1895	Patrick H. Meade		
1896	Sir John Scott	Unionist	
1897	Patrick H. Meade		
1898	Patrick H. Meade		
1899–1900	Eugene Crean	Irish Parliamentary Party	Last officeholder before title was changed

== Lord Mayors of Cork ==
=== 20th century ===
Year	Name	Party	Notes
1900	Sir Daniel Hegarty		First Lord Mayor of Cork
1901	Edward Fitzgerald		Created a baronet on 7 September 1903
1902	Edward Fitzgerald		Created a baronet on 7 September 1903
1903	Sir Edward Fitzgerald, 1st Baronet		Created a baronet on 7 September 1903
1904	Augustine Roche	Irish Parliamentary Party	MP for Cork 1905–1910
1905	Joseph Barrett		Grandfather of Stephen D. Barrett
1906	Joseph Barrett		
1907	Richard Cronin		
1908	Thomas Donovan		
1909	Thomas Donovan		
1910	Thomas Donovan		
1911	Henry O'Shea		
1911	James Simcox	All-for-Ireland League	
1912	James Simcox	All-for-Ireland League	
1912	Henry O'Shea	Irish Parliamentary Party	Redmondite IPP
1913	Henry O'Shea	Irish Parliamentary Party	
1914	Henry O'Shea	Irish Parliamentary Party	
1915	Henry O'Shea	Irish Parliamentary Party	
1916	Thomas C. Butterfield		
1917	Thomas C. Butterfield		
1918	Thomas C. Butterfield		
1919	William F. O'Connor		
1920	Tomás Mac Curtain	Sinn Féin	First Sinn Féin Lord Mayor. Shot dead by members of the Royal Irish Constabulary during the Irish War of Independence
1920	Terence MacSwiney	Sinn Féin	MacCurtain's successor, elected unanimously by the council. Died in hunger strike in Brixton Prison see 1920 Cork hunger strike
1920	Donal O'Callaghan	Sinn Féin	
1921	Donal O'Callaghan	Sinn Féin	Ex officio member of the Senate of Southern Ireland as Lord Mayor of Cork and elected in 1921 as a member for Cork Borough in the House of Commons of Southern Ireland, which would have been incompatible positions if either had functioned. He boycotted both, attending the Second Dáil as a TD.
1922	Donal O'Callaghan	Sinn Féin	
1923	Donal O'Callaghan	Sinn Féin	
1924	Seán French	Sinn Féin	Cork TD, Longest serving Lord Mayor of Cork since the foundation of the state
1925	Seán French	Sinn Féin	
1926	Seán French	Fianna Fáil	
1927	Seán French	Fianna Fáil	
1928	Seán French	Fianna Fáil	
1929	Seán French	Fianna Fáil	
1930	Frank Daly	Fianna Fáil	
1931	Frank Daly	Fianna Fáil	
1932	Seán French	Fianna Fáil	
1933	Seán French	Fianna Fáil	
1934	Seán French	Fianna Fáil	
1935	Seán French	Fianna Fáil	
1936	Seán French	Fianna Fáil	
1937	Seán French	Fianna Fáil	Died in office
1937	James Hickey	Labour Party	
1938	James Hickey	Labour Party	
1939	James Hickey	Labour Party	
1940	William Desmond	Fine Gael	
1941	John Horgan	Fine Gael	
1942	James Allen		
1942	Richard Anthony	Labour Party	
1943	James Hickey	Labour Party	
1944	Seán Cronin		
1945	Michael Sheehan	Independent	
1946	Michael Sheehan	Independent	
1947	Michael Sheehan	Independent	
1948	Michael Sheehan	Independent	
1949	Seán McCarthy	Fianna Fáil	
1950	Seán McCarthy	Fianna Fáil	
1951	Walter Furlong	Fianna Fáil	
1952	Patrick McGrath	Fianna Fáil	
1953	Patrick McGrath	Fianna Fáil	
1954	Patrick McGrath	Fianna Fáil	
1955	Patrick McGrath	Fianna Fáil	
1956	Seán Casey	Labour Party	
1957	Valentine Jago	Cork Civic Party	
1958	Seán McCarthy	Fianna Fáil	
1959	Jane Dowdall	Fianna Fáil	First female Lord Mayor of Cork
1960	Stephen D. Barrett	Fine Gael	
1961	Anthony Barry	Fine Gael	
1962	Seán Casey	Labour Party	
1963	Seán McCarthy	Fianna Fáil	
1964	Gus Healy	Fianna Fáil	
1965	Cornelius Desmond	Labour Party	
1966	Seán Casey	Labour Party	Died in office
1966	Seán McCarthy	Fianna Fáil	
1967	Pearse Wyse	Fianna Fáil	
1968	John Bermingham	Fine Gael	
1969	Thomas Pearse Leahy	Labour Party	
1970	Peter Barry	Fine Gael	Former Minister for Foreign Affairs
1971	Timothy J. O'Sullivan	Fine Gael	
1972	Seán O'Leary	Fine Gael	Grandson of John Horgan
1973	Patrick Kerrigan	Labour Party	
1974	Pearse Wyse	Fianna Fáil	
1975	Gus Healy	Fianna Fáil	
1976	Seán French	Fianna Fáil	
1977	Gerald Goldberg	Fianna Fáil	First Jewish Lord Mayor of Cork
1978	Brian C. Sloane	Fianna Fáil	
1979	Jim Corr	Fine Gael	
1980	Toddy O'Sullivan	Labour Party	
1981	Paud Black	Fianna Fáil	
1982	Hugh Coveney	Fine Gael	Minister for Defence & Minister for the Marine
1983	John Dennehy	Fianna Fáil	
1984	Liam Burke	Fine Gael	
1985	Dan Wallace	Fianna Fáil	
1986	Gerry O'Sullivan	Labour Party	Labour Party TD and Minister of State for the Marine.
1987	Thomas Brosnan	Fianna Fáil	
1988	Bernard Allen	Fine Gael	
1989	Chrissie Aherne	Fianna Fáil	
1990	Frank Nash	Labour Party	
1991	Denis Cregan	Fine Gael	
1992	Micheál Martin	Fianna Fáil	Later became leader of Fianna Fáil and Taoiseach
1993	John Murray	Labour Party	
1994	Tim Falvey	Fianna Fáil	
1995	Joe O'Callaghan	Labour Party	
1996	Jim Corr	Fine Gael	
1997	Dave McCarthy	Fianna Fáil	
1998	Joe O'Flynn	Labour Party	
1999	Damian Wallace	Fianna Fáil	Son of Dan Wallace, Lord Mayor in 1985

=== 21st century ===
Year	Name	Party	Notes
2000	P. J. Hourican	Fine Gael	
2001	Tom O'Driscoll	Fianna Fáil	
2002	John Kelleher	Labour	
2003	Colm Burke	Fine Gael	
2004	Seán Martin	Fianna Fáil	Brother of Micheál Martin
2005	Deirdre Clune	Fine Gael	Daughter of Peter Barry, TD and Senator for Cork South Central
2006	Michael Ahern	Labour	
2007	Donal Counihan	Fianna Fáil	
2008	Brian Bermingham	Fine Gael	Son of John Bermingham, Lord Mayor in 1968
2009	Dara Murphy	Fine Gael	Elected TD for Cork North Central in 2011
2010	Mick O'Connell	Labour	
2011	Terry Shannon	Fianna Fáil	
2012	John Buttimer	Fine Gael	Brother of Jerry Buttimer
2013	Catherine Clancy	Labour	Sister of Ciarán Lynch and sister-in-law of Kathleen Lynch
2014	Mary Shields	Fianna Fáil	
2015	Chris O'Leary	Sinn Féin	First Sinn Féin Lord Mayor in 90 years
2016	Des Cahill	Fine Gael	
2017	Tony Fitzgerald	Fianna Fáil	
2018	Mick Finn	Independent	First independent Lord Mayor in 70 years
2019	John Sheehan	Fianna Fáil	
2020	Joe Kavanagh	Fine Gael	
2021	Colm Kelleher	Fianna Fáil	
2022	Deirdre Forde	Fine Gael	
2023	Kieran McCarthy	Independent	
2024	Dan Boyle	Green	First Green Party Lord Mayor
2025	Fergal Dennehy	Fianna Fáil	His father, John Dennehy, was also previously Lord Mayor
2026	Damian Boylan	Fine Gael	
