= 2004 Cork City Council election =

2004 Irish local government election

- 11 June 2004

All 31 seats on Cork City Council
	First party	Second party	Third party
Party	Fianna Fáil	Fine Gael	Labour
Seats won	11	8	6
Seat change	-1	0	+1
	Fourth party	Fifth party	Sixth party
Party	Sinn Féin	Green	Progressive Democrats
Seats won	2	1	1
Seat change	+1	0	-1
	Seventh party	Eighth party
Party	Socialist Party	Independent
Seats won	1	1
Seat change	+1	-1
- Map showing the area of Cork City Council

An election to Cork City Council took place on 11 June 2004 as part of the 2004 Irish local elections. 31 councillors were elected from six local electoral areas by PR-STV voting for a five-year term of office.

== Results by party ==
Party	Seats	±	First Pref. votes	FPv%	±%
Fianna Fáil	11	-1	14,257	29.06	
Fine Gael	8	0	10,839	22.09	
Labour	6	+1	6,493	13.23	
Sinn Féin	2	+1	5,089	10.37	
Green	1	0	3,337	6.80	
Progressive Democrats	1	-1	2,300	4.69	
Socialist Party	1	+1	1,390	2.83	
Independent	1	-1	4,527	9.23	
Totals	31	0	49,064	100.00	—

== Results by local electoral area ==
=== Cork North-Central ===
Cork North-Central - 5 seats
Party	Candidate	FPv%	Count						
Party	Candidate	FPv%	1	2	3	4	5	6	7
Socialist Party	Mick Barry	17.47	1,390						
Fianna Fáil	Gary O'Flynn*	13.97	1,112	1,115	1,150	1,163	1,194	1,236	1,300
Fianna Fáil	Damian Wallace*	13.31	1,059	1,062	1,095	1,116	1,138	1,178	1,232
Labour	Catherine Clancy*	11.33	902	913	948	1,076	1,151	1,203	1,341
Sinn Féin	Jackie Connolly	10.25	816	832	858	893	949	988	1,135
Fine Gael	Patricia Gosch*	9.74	775	780	821	860	903	1,075	1,185
Independent	Paddy Brown	6.61	526	535	551	574	640	693	
Fine Gael	Joe O'Callaghan	5.81	462	465	477	486	508		
Green	Ian Mitchell	4.34	345	351	368	390			
Labour	Suzanne Mullins	3.78	301	305	315				
Progressive Democrats	Dave Buckley	3.39	270	273					
Electorate: 14,640 Valid: 7,958 (54.36%) Spoilt: 256 Quota: 1,327 Turnout: 8,214 (56.11%)

=== Cork North-East ===
Cork North-East - 5 seats
Party	Candidate	FPv%	Count					
Party	Candidate	FPv%	1	2	3	4	5	6
Progressive Democrats	Máirín Quill*	17.28	1,169					
Fianna Fáil	Tim Brosnan*	15.11	1,022	1,129				
Labour	John Kelleher*	14.78	1,000	1,033	1,042	1,154		
Fine Gael	Dara Murphy	10.76	728	740	749	909	964	1,121
Sinn Féin	Annette Spillanne	8.88	601	613	615	636	784	975
Fianna Fáil	David Whyte	8.40	568	630	639	672	729	796
Green	Philip Jones	7.21	488	494	500	553	679	
Workers' Party	Ted Tynan	7.01	474	489	492	519		
Fine Gael	Derek Connolly	6.43	435	447	450			
Fianna Fáil	Ernie Nelson*	4.14	280					
Electorate: 13,501 Valid: 6,765 (50.11%) Spoilt: 123 Quota: 1,128 Turnout: 6,888 (51.02%)

=== Cork North-West ===
Cork North-West - 5 seats
Party	Candidate	FPv%	Count								
Party	Candidate	FPv%	1	2	3	4	5	6	7	8	9
Sinn Féin	Jonathan O'Brien*	17.25	1,150								
Fianna Fáil	Dave McCarthy*	16.68	1,112								
Fine Gael	Colm Burke*	13.26	884	886	916	1,012	1,109	1,134			
Labour	Michael O'Connell*	10.68	712	720	765	778	814	888	893	956	1,070
Independent	Mick Ahern	7.98	532	537	546	564	571	607	608	632	749
Fianna Fáil	Tony Fitzgerald	7.11	474	477	481	487	512	552	553	768	871
Fianna Fáil	Tony O'Neill	6.54	436	438	448	471	490	513	514		
Workers' Party	Mick Crowley	5.37	358	364	383	387	415				
Independent	Christine O'Brien	5.11	341	346	372	393	435	513	517	566	
Fine Gael	Patty O'Brien	4.08	272	275	286	291					
Independent	John Houlihan	3.19	213	214	226						
Green	Geoffrey Kane	2.74	183	186							
Electorate: 13,376 Valid: 6,667 (49.84%) Spoilt: 186 Quota: 1,112 Turnout: 6,853 (51.23%)

=== Cork South-Central ===
Cork South-Central - 5 seats
Party	Candidate	FPv%	Count					
Party	Candidate	FPv%	1	2	3	4	5	6
Independent	Con O'Connell*	20.51	1,564					
Labour	Ciarán Lynch	16.08	1,226	1,287				
Fianna Fáil	Seán Martin*	15.62	1,191	1,215	1,254	1,334		
Fianna Fáil	Tom O'Driscoll*	14.83	1,131	1,192	1,226	1,310		
Fine Gael	Denis Cregan*	11.02	840	880	932	1,043	1,068	1,095
Sinn Féin	Fiona Kerins	9.22	703	760	845	1,039	1,052	1,064
Green	Mary Ryder	8.00	610	637	721			
Independent	Paudie Dineen	3.28	250	264				
Independent	Ted Neville	1.44	110	119				
Electorate: 14,777 Valid: 7,625 (51.60%) Spoilt: 198 Quota: 1,271 Turnout: 7,823 (52.94%)

=== Cork South-East ===
Cork South-East - 6 seats
Party	Candidate	FPv%	Count					
Party	Candidate	FPv%	1	2	3	4	5	6
Fine Gael	Deirdre Clune*	20.26	2,307					
Fianna Fáil	Donal Counihan*	12.55	1,429	1,477	1,499	1,526	1,630	
Fianna Fáil	Terry Shannon*	11.86	1,351	1,390	1,414	1,430	1,525	1,625
Labour	Denis O'Flynn*	11.74	1,337	1,391	1,417	1,464	1,517	1,651
Green	Chris O'Leary*	9.54	1,086	1,123	1,174	1,252	1,404	1,742
Fine Gael	Jim Corr*	8.80	1,002	1,357	1,459	1,478	1,514	1,565
Progressive Democrats	Teresa O'Brien*	7.56	861	924	942	965	994	1,040
Sinn Féin	Dermot O'Mahony	7.02	799	807	824	878	946	
Fianna Fáil	Seán Hourihan	5.09	580	590	607	653		
Independent	Paddy Dennehy	3.23	368	377	395			
Fine Gael	Trevor O'Sullivan	2.36	269	325				
Electorate: 20,064 Valid: 11,389 (56.76%) Spoilt: 288 Quota: 1,628 Turnout: 11,677 (58.20%)

=== Cork South-West ===
Cork South-West - 5 seats
Party	Candidate	FPv%	Count			
Party	Candidate	FPv%	1	2	3	4
Fine Gael	Jerry Buttimer	22.73	1,968			
Fianna Fáil	Fergal Dennehy*	16.26	1,408	1,455		
Fianna Fáil	Mary Shields*	12.75	1,104	1,177	1,321	1,472
Sinn Féin	Henry Cremin	11.78	1,020	1,047	1,102	1,223
Labour	Michael Ahern*	11.72	1,015	1,076	1,167	1,386
Fine Gael	Brian Bermingham*	10.36	897	1,119	1,236	1,394
Green	Patrick Murray	7.22	625	683	832	
Independent	Mick Murphy	7.19	623	659		
Electorate: 15,222 Valid: 8,660 (56.89%) Spoilt: 153 Quota: 1,444 Turnout: 8,813 (57.90%)
