= 1999 Cork Corporation election =

Irish local election

- 10 June 1999

All 31 seats to Cork City Council
	First party	Second party	Third party
Party	Fianna Fáil	Fine Gael	Labour
Seats won	12	8	5
Seat change	+3	+2	-1
	Fourth party	Fifth party	Sixth party
Party	Progressive Democrats	Green	Sinn Féin
Seats won	2	1	1
Seat change	-1	0	+1
	Seventh party	Eighth party
Party	Independent	Workers' Party
Seats won	2	0
Seat change	-1	-3
- Map showing the area of Cork City Council

An election to Cork City Council took place on 10 June 1999 as part of that year's Irish local elections. 31 councillors were elected from six local electoral areas on the system of proportional representation by means of the single transferable vote (PR-STV) for a five-year term of office.

== Results by party ==
Party	Seats	±	First Pref. votes	FPv%	±%
Fianna Fáil	12	+3	15,452	36.69	
Fine Gael	8	+2	9,257	21.98	
Labour	5	-1	6,120	14.53	
Progressive Democrats	2	-1	2,739	6.50	
Green	1	0	2,128	5.05	
Sinn Féin	1	+1	1,798	4.27	
Independent	2	-1	3,540	8.41	
Workers' Party	0	-3	729	1.73	
Totals	31	0	42,112	100.00	—

== Results by local electoral area ==
=== Cork North-Central ===
Cork North-Central - 5 seats
Party	Candidate	FPv%	Count								
Party	Candidate	FPv%	1	2	3	4	5	6	7	8	9
Fianna Fáil	Noel O'Flynn TD*	22.70	1,620								
Labour	Kathleen Lynch*	15.57	1,111	1,179	1,213						
Fine Gael	Bernard Allen TD	13.70	978	1,035	1,061	1,066	1,241				
Fianna Fáil	Damian Wallace*	13.21	943	1,145	1,177	1,182	1,198				
Independent	Con O'Leary*	11.00	785	818	842	842	860	870	873	949	1,025
Labour	Joe O'Callaghan*	5.16	368	384	398	405	416	420	422	444	484
Socialist Party	Mick Barry	4.89	349	362	381	381	389	393	393	472	516
Sinn Féin	Jonathan O'Brien	3.76	268	276	282	284	293	297	297		
Fine Gael	June McCarthy	3.70	264	275	283	283	307	336	337	354	
Fine Gael	Tom Considine*	3.64	260	267	276	278					
Green	Donie O'Leary	2.68	191	206							
Electorate: 15,034 Valid: 7,137 (47.47%) Spoilt: 66 Quota: 1,190 Turnout: 7,260 (48.29%)

=== Cork North-East ===
Cork North-East - 5 seats
Party	Candidate	FPv%	Count								
Party	Candidate	FPv%	1	2	3	4	5	6	7	8	9
Progressive Democrats	Senator Máirín Quill*	21.84	1,222								
Fianna Fáil	Tim Brosnan*	16.73	936								
Fine Gael	Liam Burke TD*	12.83	718	765	774	774	789	813	1,071		
Fianna Fáil	Billy Kelleher TD	12.69	710	785	826	828	859	898	980		
Fine Gael	Dara Murphy	8.42	471	519	530	531	547	574			
Labour	Frank Nash*	8.08	452	486	504	504	546	637	686	744	761
Labour	John Kelleher	7.38	413	444	463	463	524	617	695	758	780
Workers' Party	Ted Tynan	4.38	245	258	300	300					
Green	Bernadette Walsh	4.06	227	262	303	303	382				
Sinn Féin	Michael Nugent	2.97	166	170							
Independent	George Harrington	0.64	36								
Electorate: 13,361 Valid: 5,596 (41.88%) Spoilt: 60 Quota: 933 Turnout: 5,656 (42.33%)

=== Cork North-West ===
Cork North-West - 5 seats
Party	Candidate	FPv%	Count											
Party	Candidate	FPv%	1	2	3	4	5	6	7	8	9	10	11	12
Fianna Fáil	Dave McCarthy*	16.02	933	945	950	965	980							
Fianna Fáil	Tim Falvey*	15,39	896	900	908	940	973							
Fine Gael	Colm Burke*	12.81	746	751	770	787	862	878	913	916	1,014			
Labour	Michael O'Connell*	8.55	498	503	526	538	553	605	693	694	720	726	790	906
Sinn Féin	Don O'Leary	8.42	471	481	488	508	525	540	562	563	590	592	651	709
Workers' Party	Jimmy Homan*	5.92	345	349	355	370	388	416	455	457	472	477	506	596
Fianna Fáil	Gerry Byrne	5.19	302	303	312	318	327	337	348	349				
Fine Gael	Anna Hughes	4.64	270	272	279	286	312	324	352	352	369	387		
Independent	Christine O'Brien	4.29	250	257	263	267	269							
Labour	George Cummins	4.26	248	251	277	284	298	310						
Green	Claire Gould-Fielding	4.24	247	255	261	270	286	354	374	375	397	409	472	
Fine Gael	John Devereaux	4.21	245	247	252	259								
Independent	Frank Wallace	2.70	157	158	167									
Labour	Declan Walsh	2.47	144	145										
Independent	Brian Cullen	1.10	64											
Electorate: 13,492 Valid: 5,823 (43.16%) Spoilt: 101 Quota: 971 Turnout: 5,924 (43.91%)

=== Cork South-Central ===
Cork South-Central - 5 seats
Party	Candidate	FPv%	Count									
Party	Candidate	FPv%	1	2	3	4	5	6	7	8	9	10
Independent	Con O'Connell	18.74	1,375									
Fianna Fáil	Seán Martin*	16.51	1,211	1,227								
Fianna Fáil	Tom O'Driscoll*	14.04	1,030	1,061	1,080	1,146	1,159	1,187	1,219	1,424		
Fine Gael	Senator Denis Cregan*	10.92	801	821	822	842	853	958	1,009	1,054	1,075	1,179
Green	Dan Boyle*	10.18	747	763	793	810	868	896	978	1,016	1,040	1,139
Labour	John Murray*	8.68	637	656	658	659	676	696	709	731	747	916
Labour	Ciarán Lynch	4.98	365	378	384	386	414	430	446	473	487	
Fianna Fáil	Anthony Kenneally	4.66	342	347	350	373	384	391	403			
Progressive Democrats	Brian Russell	3.12	229	234	237	241	251	264				
Fine Gael	Francis Lennox	2.88	211	221	221	229	236					
Fianna Fáil	Padraig Treacy	1.95	143	146	150							
Workers' Party	Sean McCarthy	1.89	139	148	175	176						
Independent	James McBarron	1.44	106	111								
Electorate: 15,242 Valid: 7,336 (48.13%) Spoilt: 115 Quota: 1,223 Turnout: 7,451 (48.88%)

=== Cork South-East ===
Cork South-East - 6 seats
Party	Candidate	FPv%	Count							
Party	Candidate	FPv%	1	2	3	4	5	6	7	8
Fianna Fáil	Terry Shannon	14.24	1,289	1,294						
Fine Gael	Deirdre Clune	12.66	1,146	1,172	1,190	1,406				
Fianna Fáil	Donal Counihan*	12.62	1,143	1,213	1,254	1,275	1,281	1,288	1,371	
Fine Gael	Jim Corr*	12.35	1,118	1,153	1,166	1,278	1,365			
Labour	Joe O'Flynn*	12.11	1,096	1,108	1,155	1,198	1,206	1,222	1,472	
Progressive Democrats	John Minihan	8.91	807	846	857	912	919	936	1,034	1,108
Fianna Fáil	Maurice MacCarthy	7.50	679	742	784	799	799	802	883	914
Green	Chris O'Leary	6.76	612	630	737	774	778	787		
Fine Gael	Brian Sullivan	5.49	497	513	521					
Sinn Féin	Kevin Power	3.80	344	350						
Fianna Fáil	Sean O'Riordan	2.92	264							
Independent	Mark Dillon	0.65	59							
Electorate: 19,743 Valid: 9,054 (45.86%) Spoilt: 110 Quota: 1,294 Turnout: 9,164 (46.42%)

=== Cork South-West ===
Cork South-West - 5 seats
Party	Candidate	FPv%	Count							
Party	Candidate	FPv%	1	2	3	4	5	6	7	8
Fianna Fáil	John Dennehy TD*	24.57	1,849							
Labour	Michael Ahern*	10.47	788	833	860	948	1,035	1,156	1,222	1,260
Fine Gael	Brian Bermingham*	10.23	770	811	836	862	966	999	1,040	1,063
Fianna Fáil	Mary Shields	10.18	766	900	943	980	1,069	1,116	1,498	
Fine Gael	P.J. Hourican*	10.12	762	792	815	840	902	954	994	1,011
Sinn Féin	Henry Cremin	7.29	549	575	598	644	673			
Independent	Patrick Murray*	6.51	490	522	567	642	734	861	917	975
Progressive Democrats	Niall O'Keeffe	6.39	481	521	568	610				
Fianna Fáil	Michael Sheehy	5.26	396	579	600	627	679	764		
Green	Tom O'Sullivan	4.66	351	393	440					
Independent	Douglas Rice	4.31	324	345						
Electorate: 16,485 Valid: 7,526 (45.65%) Spoilt: 92 Quota: 1,255 Turnout: 7,618 (46.21%)
