= 2009 Cork City Council election =

Part of the 2009 Irish local elections

- 5 June 2009

All 31 seats on Cork City Council
	First party	Second party	Third party
Party	Fine Gael	Labour	Fianna Fáil
Seats won	8	7	6
Seat change	0	+1	-5
	Fourth party	Fifth party	Sixth party
Party	Sinn Féin	Socialist Party	Workers' Party
Seats won	4	1	1
Seat change	+2	0	+1
	Seventh party	Eighth party	Ninth party
Party	Independent	Green	Progressive Democrats
Seats won	4	0	0
Seat change	+3	-1	-1
- Map showing the area of Cork City Council

An election to Cork City Council took place on 5 June 2009 as part of that year's Irish local elections. 31 councillors were elected from six local electoral areas (LEAs) for a five-year term of office on the electoral system of proportional representation by means of the single transferable vote (PR-STV).

== Results by party ==
Party	Seats	±	First Pref. votes	FPv%	±%
Fine Gael	8	0	11,885	25.42	
Labour	7	+1	8,693	18.59	
Fianna Fáil	6	-5	9,536	20.39	
Sinn Féin	4	+2	5,057	10.82	
Socialist Party	1	0	2,391	5.11	
Workers' Party	1	+1	1,158	2.48	
Independent	4	+3	6,502	13.91	
Green	0	-1	1,537	3.29	
Progressive Democrats	0	-1	N/A	N/A	
Totals	31	0	46,759	100.00	—

== Results by local electoral area ==
=== Cork North-Central ===
Cork North-Central - 5 seats
Party	Candidate	FPv%	Count								
Party	Candidate	FPv%	1	2	3	4	5	6	7	8	9
Socialist Party	Mick Barry*	26.45	2,096								
Labour	Catherine Clancy*	13.59	1,077	1,233	1,262	1,300	1,339				
Fianna Fáil	Ken O'Flynn*	10.65	844	871	873	883	892	893	910	934	1,276
Fine Gael	Patricia Gosch*	10.39	823	892	905	1,031	1,059	1,062	1,153	1,241	1,348
Fianna Fáil	Damian Wallace*	8.66	686	708	711	718	731	732	747	775	
Sinn Féin	Thomas Gould	7.80	618	740	743	770	807	807	942	1,078	1,136
Labour	Paddy Brown	5.81	460	564	576	597	624	632	693	818	884
Independent	Jim Cronin	4.95	392	466	469	478	539	540	627		
Workers' Party	Jackie Connolly	4.43	351	478	487	494	532	536			
Fine Gael	Joe Kavanagh	3.24	257	277	280						
Independent	Annette Spillane*	2.93	232	273	281	294					
Green	Ian Gallagher	1.10	87	100							
Electorate: 14,317 Valid: 7,923 (55.34%) Spoilt: 194 Quota: 1,321 Turnout: 8,117 (56.69%)

=== Cork North-East ===
Cork North-East - 4 seats
Party	Candidate	FPv%	Count					
Party	Candidate	FPv%	1	2	3	4	5	6
Labour	John Kelleher*	18.70	1,024	1,091	1,165			
Fianna Fáil	Tim Brosnan*	18.61	1,019	1,034	1,079	1,084	1,152	
Fine Gael	Dara Murphy*	18.47	1,011	1,035	1,102			
Independent	David Whyte	9.88	541	565	611	618	703	815
Workers' Party	Ted Tynan	8.93	489	576	601	615	698	938
Sinn Féin	Pat Coughlan	7.78	426	464	476	481	526	
Fine Gael	Derek Connolly	6.83	374	383	393	410		
Green	Ken Walsh	5.41	296	310				
Socialist Party	Dave Keating	5.39	295					
Electorate: 10,431 Valid: 5,475 (52.49%) Spoilt: 82 Quota: 1,096 Turnout: 5,557 (53.27%)

=== Cork North-West ===
Cork North-West - 4 seats
Party	Candidate	FPv%	Count						
Party	Candidate	FPv%	1	2	3	4	5	6	7
Independent	Dave McCarthy*	23.36	1,419						
Sinn Féin	Jonathan O'Brien*	21.71	1,319						
Labour	Michael O'Connell*	15.29	929	988	1,012	1,130	1,716	1,280	
Fine Gael	Joe O'Callaghan*	13.25	805	839	856	906	936	1,013	1,050
Fianna Fáil	Tony Fitzgerald*	12.10	735	778	783	830	846	1,071	1,098
Fianna Fáil	John Sheehan	8.00	436	507	511	539	550		
Workers' Party	Mick Crowley	5.23	318	357	364				
Green	Nicholas McMurray	1.05	64	71					
Electorate: 10,964 Valid: 6,075 (55.41%) Spoilt: 118 Quota: 1,216 Turnout: 6,193 (56.48%)

=== Cork South-Central ===
Cork South-Central - 5 seats
Party	Candidate	FPv%	Count				
Party	Candidate	FPv%	1	2	3	4	5
Labour	Lorraine Kingston*	25.48	1,778				
Independent	Mick Finn	13.23	923	1,029	1,050	1,140	1,230
Fine Gael	Emmet O'Halloran	11.44	798	904	914	1,164	
Fianna Fáil	Seán Martin*	833	790	837	879	1,235	
Sinn Féin	Fiona Kerins*	11.06	772	887	910	979	1,038
Fianna Fáil	Tom O'Driscoll*	9.13	637	682	696	726	
Independent	Paudie Dineen	9.01	629	702	730	806	900
Fine Gael	Billy MacGill	4.16	290	352	357		
Green	Mary Ryder	3.54	247	296	302		
Independent	Tom McIntyre	1.63	114	129			
Electorate: 12,858 Valid: 6,978 (54.27%) Spoilt: 164 Quota: 1,164 Turnout: 7,142 (55.55%)

=== Cork South-East ===
Cork South-East - 7 seats
Party	Candidate	FPv%	Count						
Party	Candidate	FPv%	1	2	3	4	5	6	7
Fine Gael	Des Cahill	15.45	1,776						
Fine Gael	Laura McGonigle*	14.58	1,675						
Labour	Denis O'Flynn*	13.24	1,522						
Fianna Fáil	Terry Shannon*	10.57	1,215	1,236	1,255	1,263	1,388	1,867	
Independent	Chris O'Leary*	10.24	1,177	1,205	1,232	1,252	1,374	1,433	1,459
Independent	Kieran McCarthy	9.35	1,075	1,117	1,160	1,173	1,313	1,380	1,483
Fine Gael	Jim Corr*	7.23	831	999	1,112	1,131	1,228	1,319	1,384
Sinn Féin	Ken Ahern	7.17	824	838	847	858	907	930	957
Fianna Fáil	Donal Counihan*	6.34	729	748	755	758	853		
Green	Stephen Crowley	3.14	361	395	408	417			
Fianna Fáil	Deirdre Foley	2.67	307	320	327	329			
Electorate: 19,409 Valid: 11,492 (59.21%) Spoilt: 140 Quota: 1,437 Turnout: 11,632 (59.93%)

=== Cork South-West ===
Cork South-West - 6 seats
Party	Candidate	FPv%	Count				
Party	Candidate	FPv%	1	2	3	4	5
Fine Gael	John Buttimer*	23.35	2,070				
Fianna Fáil	Mary Shields*	13.49	1,196	1,283			
Labour	Michael Ahern*	12.63	1,120	1,204	1,304		
Sinn Féin	Henry Cremin	12.38	1,098	1,125	1,164	1,208	1,220
Fianna Fáil	Fergal Dennehy*	10.62	942	981	1,027	1,085	1,095
Labour	Ger Gibbons*	8.83	783	871	957	1,131	1,180
Fine Gael	Barry Keane	6.77	600	754	814		
Fine Gael	Brian Bermingham*	6.49	575	867	957	1,338	
Green	Mick Murphy	5.44	482	514			
Electorate: 14,907 Valid: 8,866 (59.48%) Spoilt: 153 Quota: 1,267 Turnout: 8,993 (60.33%)
