= 2014 Cork City Council election =

Part of the 2014 Irish local elections

- 23 May 2014

All 31 seats on Cork City Council
	First party	Second party	Third party
Party	Fianna Fáil	Sinn Féin	Fine Gael
Seats won	10	8	5
	Fourth party	Fifth party	Sixth party
Party	Anti-Austerity Alliance	Workers' Party	Independent
Seats won	3	1	4
- Map showing the area of Cork City Council

An election to all 31 seats on Cork City Council was held on 23 May 2014 as part of the 2014 Irish local elections, contested by a field of 65 candidates. The city of Cork was divided into six local electoral areas to elect councillors for a five-year term of office on the electoral system of proportional representation by means of the single transferable vote (PR-STV).

Having lost several seats in the 2009 local elections within Cork City Fianna Fáil made 4 gains in these local elections. The party gained 1 seat in each of the 3 Cork South Central LEAs, the base of Micheál Martin, and 1 seat in the Cork City North Central LEA on the North Side. Sinn Féin emerged as the second largest party with 8 seats as they made 3 gains on both sides of the river Lee though effectively matched Fianna Fáil in terms of first preference vote share. Fine Gael lost 3 seats to be reduced to 5 seats while their coalition partner, the Labour Party, was obliterated losing all 7 seats. The Anti-Austerity Alliance made 2 gains to return 3 councillors to City Hall and Ted Tynan became the Workers' Party sole elected representative in the State. Independents secured the remaining 4 seats.

== Results by party ==
Party	Seats	±	1st pref	FPv%
Fianna Fáil	10	+4	9,816	23.99
Sinn Féin	8	+4	9,815	23.99
Fine Gael	5	-3	7,758	18.96
Independent	4	-	6,156	15.05
Anti-Austerity Alliance	3	+3	2,398	5.86
Workers' Party	1	0	1,243	3.04
Labour	0	-7	2,433	5.95
Socialist Party	0	-1	-	-
Total	31	0	40,911	100.00

== Results by local electoral area ==
*: Outgoing councillor.

=== Cork City North Central ===
Cork City North Central: 5 seats
Party	Candidate	FPv%	Count					
Party	Candidate	FPv%	1	2	3	4	5	6
Sinn Féin	Thomas Gould	26.71	1,828					
Anti-Austerity Alliance	Mick Barry	21.36	1,462					
Fianna Fáil	Ken O'Flynn	14.57	997	1,072	1,092	1,111	1,136	1,202
Fianna Fáil	John Sheehan	11.29	773	853	879	901	932	1,010
Fine Gael	Patricia Gosch	7.04	482	510	522	567	583	
Labour	Catherine Clancy	7.03	481	532	553	571	603	783
Anti-Austerity Alliance	Lil O'Donnell	6.31	432	712	909	924	1,115	1,194
Independent	Billy Corcoran	3.70	253	409	451	456		
Fine Gael	Donncha Loftus	2.00	137	154	157			
Electorate: 14,280 Valid: 6,845 (47.93%) Spoilt: 166 Quota: 1,401 Turnout: 7,011 (49.10%)

=== Cork City North East ===
Cork City North East: 4 seats
Party	Candidate	FPv%	Count					
Party	Candidate	FPv%	1	2	3	4	5	6
Sinn Féin	Stephen Cunningham	26.71	971					
Workers' Party	Ted Tynan	21.36	962					
Fianna Fáil	Tim Brosnan	14.57	931	951	954	955	979	
Fine Gael	Joe Kavanagh	11.29	655	658	659	659	691	903
Labour	John Kelleher	7.04	424	443	446	447	541	662
Fine Gael	Sue-Ellen Carroll	7.03	414	420	422	423	461	
Green	Oliver Moran	6.31	235	287	291	292		
Independent	Philip A. McCarthy	3.70	124	124				
Communist	Michael O'Donnell	2.00	72	72				
Electorate: 10,402 Valid: 4,788 (46.63%) Spoilt: 75 Quota: 958 Turnout: 4,863 (47.36%)

=== Cork City North West ===
Cork City North West: 4 seats
Party	Candidate	FPv%	Count										
Party	Candidate	FPv%	1	2	3	4	5	6	7	8	9	10	11
Sinn Féin	Mick Nugent	22.37	1,206										
Fianna Fáil	Tony Fitzgerald	19.47	1,050	1,058	1,061	1,078	1,109						
Sinn Féin	Kenneth Collins	15.0	809	893	896	928	953	954	995	1,060	1,179		
Anti-Austerity Alliance	Marion O'Sullivan	9.35	504	513	517	557	576	580	628	672	766	795	969
Labour	Michael O'Connell	5.23	282	285	285	295	316	318	336				
Workers' Party	James Coughlan	5.21	281	287	289	304	312	313	339	385			
Fine Gael	Joe O'Callaghan	5.19	280	282	284	286	373	380	392	455	476	494	535
Independent	Maurice Sheehan	4.99	269	273	280	330	340	343	406	425	469	482	
Fine Gael	Lyndsey Clarke	4.43	239	240	243	248	248						
Independent	Evan Murphy	4.21	227	230	239	265	282	283					
Independent	Pat O'Shea	2.21	119	122	123	123							
Independent	Barry O'Donovan	1.59	86	89	95	95							
Independent	John Murphy	0.74	40	41									
Electorate: 10,932 Valid: 5,392 (49.32%) Spoilt: 116 Quota: 1,079 Turnout: 5,508 (50.38%)

=== Cork City South Central ===
Cork City South Central: 5 seats
Party	Candidate	FPv%	Count								
Party	Candidate	FPv%	1	2	3	4	5	6	7	8	9
Independent	Mick Finn	23.33	1,437								
Sinn Féin	Fiona Kerins	23.28	1,434								
Fianna Fáil	Tom O'Driscoll	12.40	764	837	885	898	902	905	914	925	1,007
Fianna Fáil	Seán Martin	10.39	640	681	717	721	736	742	750	759	834
Independent	Paudie Dineen	8.54	526	666	813	850	863	909	945	1,064	
Labour	Lorraine Kingston	7.06	435	484	521	525	543	558	602	624	795
Fine Gael	Emmet O'Halloran	6.51	401	423	433	434	484	489	498	506	
Green	Johnny O'Mahony	2.0	123	130	156	158	164	172	172		
Independent	Brian Houlihan	1.93	119	145	187	208	209	248	271	271	
Fine Gael	Billy MacGill	1.9	117	124	128	128	128				
Independent	Ella Goddin	1.46	90	115	141	154	156	156			
Independent	Tom McIntyre	1.19	73	93	124						
Electorate: 13,023 Valid: 6,159 (47.29%) Spoilt: 123 Quota: 1,027 Turnout: 6,282 (48.24%)

=== Cork City South East ===
Cork City South East: 7 seats
Party	Candidate	FPv%	Count							
Party	Candidate	FPv%	1	2	3	4	5	6	7	8
Independent	Kieran McCarthy	15.08	1,534							
Sinn Féin	Chris O'Leary	12.73	1,295							
Fine Gael	Des Cahill	11.56	1,176	1,199	1,318					
Fine Gael	Laura McGonigle	10.89	1,108	1,150	1,276					
Fianna Fáil	Terry Shannon	9.74	991	1,014	1,041	1,048	1,049	1,124	1,160	1,275
Fianna Fáil	Nicholas O'Keeffe	8.42	856	873	899	904	906	990	1,028	1,096
Fianna Fáil	Kate Martin	6.94	706	721	744	747	747	804	835	951
Sinn Féin	Shane O'Shea	6.19	630	654	660	662	679	745	905	1,000
Green	Dan Boyle	4.97	505	537	557	562	563	671	802	
Independent	Diarmaid O Cadhla	4.79	487	550	561	564	565	594		
Labour	Denis O'Flynn	4.74	482	496	522	543	544			
Fine Gael	Derek Cregan	3.94	401	410						
Electorate: 19,576 Valid: 10,171 (51.96%) Spoilt: 155 Quota: 1,272 Turnout: 10,326 (52.75%)

=== Cork City South West ===
Cork City South West: 6 seats
Party	Candidate	FPv%	Count							
Party	Candidate	FPv%	1	2	3	4	5	6	7	8
Fine Gael	John Buttimer	15.08	1,750							
Sinn Féin	Henry Cremin	12.73	1,642							
Fianna Fáil	Mary Shields	11.56	1,065	1,198						
Fianna Fáil	Fergal Dennehy	10.89	1,043	1,121						
Independent	Thomas Moloney	9.74	409	425	613	616	617	635	732	798
Independent	Thomas Kiely	8.42	363	381	584	589	593	628	715	796
Green	Mick Murphy	6.94	357	387	462	470	476	522		
Labour	Ger Gibbons	6.19	329	413	463	480	489	574	668	
Fine Gael	P.J. Hourican	4.97	301	491	514	556	571	737	809	1,013
Fine Gael	Barry Keane	4.79	297	418	441	462	468	468		
Electorate: 14,830 Valid: 7,556 (50.95%) Spoilt: 138 Quota: 1,080 Turnout: 7,697 (51.90%)

== Changes ==
=== Co-options ===
Party	Outgoing	LEA	Reason	Date	Co-optee
Anti-Austerity Alliance	Mick Barry	Cork City North-Central	Elected to the 32nd Dáil at the 2016 general election.	25 April 2016	Fiona Ryan

=== Changes in affiliation ===
Name	LEA	Elected as	New affiliation	Date
Lil O'Donnell	Cork City North-Central	Anti-Austerity Alliance	Independent	13 March 2017
