= 1991 Cork Corporation election =

Part of the 1991 Irish local elections

- 27 June 1991

All 31 seats on Cork City Council
	First party	Second party	Third party
Party	Fianna Fáil	Fine Gael	Labour
Seats won	9	6	6
Seat change	-4	-2	+1
	Fourth party	Fifth party	Sixth party
Party	Workers' Party	Progressive Democrats	Green
Seats won	3	3	1
Seat change	+1	+3	+1
	Seventh party
Party	Independent
Seats won	3
Seat change	0
- Map showing the area of Cork City Council

An election to Cork City Council took place on 27 June 1991 as part of that year's Irish local elections. 31 councillors were elected from six local electoral areas (LEAs) for a five-year term of office on the electoral system of proportional representation by means of the single transferable vote (PR-STV). This term was extended twice, first to 1998, then to 1999.

== Results by party ==
Party	Seats	±	First Pref. votes	FPv%	±%
Fianna Fáil	9	-4	13,427	29.0	
Fine Gael	6	-2	8,684	18.8	
Labour	6	+1	6,591	14.2	
Workers' Party	3	+1	4,600	9.9	
Progressive Democrats	3	+3	3,867	8.4	
Green	1	+1	2,385	5.2	
Independent	3	0	5,604	12.1	
Totals	31	0	46,288	100.0	—

== Results by local electoral area ==
=== Cork North-Central ===
Cork North-Central - 5 seats
Party	Candidate	FPv%	Count											
Party	Candidate	FPv%	1	2	3	4	5	6	7	8	9	10	11	12
Fine Gael	Bernard Allen TD*	17.5%	1,291											
Labour	Joe O'Callaghan*	13.1%	971	990	997	1,020	1,047	1,063	1,089	1,110	1,147	1,205	1,269	
Fianna Fáil	Noel O'Flynn	12.2%	903	905	909	917	931	941	952	1,058	1,066	1,089	1,145	1,246
Independent	Con O'Leary	10.9%	802	812	817	830	856	886	927	940	961	1,001	1,061	1,232
Fianna Fáil	Damian Wallace	9.7%	715	718	722	732	742	767	781	865	874	907	983	1,048
Independent	Donie O'Leary	5.2%	381	386	388	398	421	438	466	474	489	511	554	
Workers' Party	Denis Leahy	4.7%	344	358	360	375	387	395	437	444	633	647	694	750
Progressive Democrats	Dave Buckley	4.5%	334	336	341	351	359	382	398	424	437	480		
Fianna Fáil	Paud Black*	3.9%	285	285	288	291	295	314	319					
Fine Gael	Maebh Sheehan	3.6%	263	265	286	299	307	322	332	341	348			
Workers' Party	Colette Harris	3.3%	247	257	258	282	287	293	321	326				
Sinn Féin	Don O'Leary	3.3%	242	253	254	261	275	278						
Independent	Declan Kelly	2.4%	180	182	183	193	203							
Independent	Bernie Murphy*	2.3%	169	177	178	188								
Green	Brendan Burke	2.2%	161	165	167									
Independent	Pat Maloney	1.3%	98											
Electorate: 13,853 Valid: 7,386 (53.3%) Spoilt: 116 Quota: 1,232 Turnout: 7,502 (54.2%)

=== Cork North-East ===
Cork North-East - 5 seats
Party	Candidate	FPv%	Count							
Party	Candidate	FPv%	1	2	3	4	5	6	7	8
Workers' Party	John Kelleher*	17.3%	1,045							
Progressive Democrats	Máirín Quill TD*	15.9%	961	965	969	1,005	1,059			
Labour	Frank Nash*	13.3%	803	812	825	870	899	950	959	1,081
Fine Gael	Liam Burke*	11.8%	711	712	715	799	820	1,011		
Fianna Fáil	Tim Brosnan*	10.8%	654	656	658	672	758	790	801	1,069
Green	Donogh McCarthy-Morrogh	7.9%	478	500	509	526	538	582	591	623
Fianna Fáil	Pat McRory	7.1%	429	429	431	456	529	545	553	
Fianna Fáil	Brid Houlihan	5.1%	306	307	310	316				
Fine Gael	Betty McGee	5%	304	306	307	371	379			
Fine Gael	Tadhg McAuliffe	4.9%	297	297	299					
Independent	James Howe	0.8%	46							
Electorate: 12,462 Valid: 6,034 (48.4%) Spoilt: 164 Quota: 1,006 Turnout: 6,198 (49.7%)

=== Cork North-West ===
Cork North-West - 5 seats
Party	Candidate	FPv%	Count									
Party	Candidate	FPv%	1	2	3	4	5	6	7	8	9	10
Labour	Gerry O'Sullivan TD*	17.3%	1,253									
Fianna Fáil	Dan Wallace TD*	16.5%	1,198	1,202	1,209							
Workers' Party	Jimmy Homan	14.6%	1,058	1,064	1,076	1,080	1,088	1,145	1,165	1,332		
Fianna Fáil	Dave McCarthy*	11.3%	821	826	829	835	838	868	898	978	1,024	1,047
Fianna Fáil	Tim Falvey*	10.1%	735	738	744	748	765	778	839	877	925	945
Fine Gael	Michael O'Leary	6%	437	439	443	526	693	732	858	872	960	972
Sinn Féin	Thomas Flynn	5.3%	384	385	389	390	391	406	412			
Labour	Pat Magner	4.6%	334	352	362	365	376	431	474	509		
Progressive Democrats	Jack Coughlan	4.1%	297	298	301	312	333	375				
Green	John T. O'Sullivan	3.9%	279	281	287	305	314					
Fine Gael	Pat Hickey	2.9%	215	216	216	254						
Fine Gael	David Riordan	2.3%	170	171	173							
Independent	Philip Murray	0.87%	63	64								
Electorate: 14,357 Valid: 7,244 (43.2%) Spoilt: 106 Quota: 1,208 Turnout: 7,350 (43.91%)

=== Cork South-Central ===
Cork South-Central - 5 seats
Party	Candidate	FPv%	Count								
Party	Candidate	FPv%	1	2	3	4	5	6	7	8	9
Fianna Fáil	Micheál Martin TD*	24.2%	1,746								
Workers' Party	Kathleen Lynch*	15.7%	1,136	1,197	1,203						
Labour	John Murray*	13.2%	955	988	990	1,012	1,054	1,119	1,135	1,170	1,290
Fianna Fáil	Tom O'Driscoll	8.1%	581	799	801	825	845	863	1,085	1,111	1,165
Fine Gael	Denis Cregan*	8.1%	581	621	625	657	685	713	732	982	1,067
Labour	Pat Dawson	7.3%	523	549	550	568	606	627	650	671	790
Independent	Con O'Connell	6%	434	447	447	467	500	612	625	648	
Fine Gael	Fidelma Collins	4.5%	328	344	346	371	379	391	408		
Independent	Damien McSweeney	3.7%	268	285	287	304	333				
Independent	Bernie Kennedy	3%	222	230	239	248					
Fianna Fáil	Hannah Carrington	3%	221	316	316	326	343	354			
Progressive Democrats	Noel Walsh	2.7%	192	205	205						
Independent	A.J. Cotter	0.4%	26	29							
Electorate: 12,765 Valid: 7,213 (56.5%) Spoilt: 122 Quota: 1,203 Turnout: 7,335 (57.5%)

=== Cork South-East ===
Cork South-East - 6 seats
Party	Candidate	FPv%	Count											
Party	Candidate	FPv%	1	2	3	4	5	6	7	8	9	10	11	12
Fine Gael	Jim Corr*	12.97%	1,315	1,351	1,353	1,369	1,376	1,528						
Progressive Democrats	Pearse Wyse TD*	12.1%	1,222	1,233	1,236	1,266	1,283	1,311	1,318	1,331	1,425	1,473		
Fianna Fáil	Chrissie Aherne*	10.1%	1,027	1,041	1,050	1,091	1,177	1,190	1,194	1,221	1,246	1,299	1,331	1,409
Green	Dan Boyle	9.8%	989	994	1,002	1,023	1,039	1,054	1,057	1,127	1,182	1,255	1,388	1,518
Independent	Sean Beausang*	9.1%	923	929	965	970	988	1,010	1,015	1,042	1,097	1,185	1,280	1,486
Fianna Fáil	Donal Counihan*	7.3%	743	746	747	779	838	846	849	860	883	905	918	1,012
Labour	Joe O'Flynn	7.1%	723	734	755	765	783	796	798	821	853	895	1,049	1,168
Independent	Ted McCarthy*	6.2%	628	634	643	647	654	662	666	684	743	802	838	
Workers' Party	Sean McCarthy	4.4%	442	445	459	466	479	481	481	530	550	576		
Independent	Rose White	3.4%	348	359	359	400	427	437	440	493	511			
Fine Gael	Frank Heffernan	3.3%	338	354	355	355	355	411	459	465				
Sinn Féin	Liam Burke	3.3%	333	350	351	361	361	361						
Fine Gael	Jean McNicholl-Murphy	2.9%	295	328	331	331	332							
Fianna Fáil	Maurice MacCarthy	2.4%	240	244	267	298								
Fianna Fáil	Denis O'Brien	2%	203	205	206									
Independent	Paddy Dennehy	1.96%	199	203										
Fine Gael	Marie O'Sullivan	1.7%	172											
Electorate: 20,320 Valid: 10,140 (49.9%) Spoilt: 83 Quota: 1,449 Turnout: 10,223 (50.3%)

=== Cork South-West ===
Cork South-West - 5 seats
Party	Candidate	FPv%	Count							
Party	Candidate	FPv%	1	2	3	4	5	6	7	8
Fianna Fáil	John Dennehy TD*	20.1%	1,662							
Labour	Toddy O'Sullivan TD*	12.4%	1,029	1,075	1,102	1,232	1,248	1,386		
Fine Gael	P.J. Hourican	11.2%	925	936	938	946	978	1,036	1,080	1,520
Progressive Democrats	Brian Bermingham*	10.4%	861	885	887	908	948	985	1,111	1,269
Independent	Patrick Murray*	9.9%	817	830	860	934	957	992	1,221	1,328
Fine Gael	Kenneth White	8%	658	662	665	672	685	765	824	
Fianna Fáil	Jerry Long	7.9%	652	703	719	732	981	1,001	1,044	1,067
Green	Jillian Delaney	5.8%	478	488	522	581	602	624		
Fine Gael	Dan Morrissey	4.6%	384	406	413	432	435			
Workers' Party	Gerry McCarthy	4%	328	333	367					
Fianna Fáil	Sean Hennigan	3.7%	306	397	406	408				
Sinn Féin	James McBarron	2%	171	177						
Electorate: 16,790 Valid: 8,271 (49.3%) Spoilt: 90 Quota: 1,371 Turnout: 8,361 (49.8%)
