= 1985 Cork Corporation election =

Part of the 1985 Irish local elections

- 20 June 1985

All 31 seats on Cork City Council
	First party	Second party	Third party
Party	Fianna Fáil	Fine Gael	Labour
Seats won	13	8	5
Seat change	0	0	0
	Fourth party	Fifth party
Party	Workers' Party	Independent
Seats won	2	3
Seat change	0	0
- Map showing the area of Cork City Council

An election to Cork City Council took place on 20 June 1985 as part of that year's Irish local elections. 31 councillors were elected from six local electoral areas (LEAs) for a five-year term of office on the electoral system of proportional representation by means of the single transferable vote (PR-STV). This term was extended for a further year, to 1991.

== Results by party ==
Party	Seats	±	First Pref. votes	FPv%	±%
Fianna Fáil	13	0	17,399	41.16	
Fine Gael	8	0	11,376	26.91	
Labour	5	0	4,478	10.59	
Workers' Party	2	0	2,394	5.66	
Independent	3	0	4,545	10.75	
Totals	31	0	42,271	100.00	—

== Results by local electoral area ==
=== Cork North-Central ===
Cork North-Central: 5 seats
Party	Candidate	FPv%	Count											
Party	Candidate	FPv%	1	2	3	4	5	6	7	8	9	10	11	12
Fine Gael	Bernard Allen TD*		1,540											
Independent	Bernie Murphy		757	779	792	811	823	848	910	927	1,042	1,089	1,242	
Fianna Fáil	Paud Black*		697	728	731	741	746	762	781	873	893	919	975	985
Fianna Fáil	David Buckley*		688	715	719	731	739	748	764	847	868	902	938	946
Fianna Fáil	Peter Falvey		580	599	600	605	612	623	639	739	766	793	853	866
Labour	Joe O'Callaghan		483	513	519	538	549	648	663	676	739	856	992	1,012
Independent	Jerry O'Riordan		415	429	433	458	465	500	539	554	608	648		
Workers' Party	Harry Carroll		337	352	360	364	367	378	427	438				
Fianna Fáil	John Coleman		334	340	340	345	346	438	351	357				
Sinn Féin	Don O'Leary		262	268	278	287	289	291						
Labour	Bertie McSweeney		212	213	225	228	243							
Fine Gael	Charles Browne		171	346	349	365	462	474	485	493	519			
Fine Gael	Richard J. Long		140	178	178	180								
Independent	Desmond Walls		126	135	139									
Communist	John N. Murphy		58	61										
Electorate: 15,131 Valid: 6,800 (45.81%) Spoilt: 131 Quota: 1,134 Turnout: 6,931

=== Cork North-East ===
Cork North-East: 5 seats
Party	Candidate	FPv%	Count									
Party	Candidate	FPv%	1	2	3	4	5	6	7	8	9	10
Fianna Fáil	Máirín Quill*		1,063									
Fine Gael	Bill Nolan*		638	642	650	734	743	754	784	792	1,209	
Workers' Party	John Kelleher		609	610	624	634	710	752	785	798	862	888
Fianna Fáil	Tim Brosnan		586	599	623	634	647	734	1,087			
Independent	Denis A. Tobin		559	561	583	593	653	697	753	772	826	853
Labour	Frank Nash		553	555	677	693	721	744	780	791	873	998
Fine Gael	Tadhg McAuliffe		464	465	478	626	633	673	722	737		
Fianna Fáil	Pat McRory		445	453	460	465	482	632				
Fianna Fáil	Noel O'Flynn		385	394	400	404	425					
Sinn Féin	Anthony Dempsey		298	298	303	307						
Fine Gael	Mairin Daly		277	278	294							
Labour	Sheila Abbott		138	139								
Labour	George McDonnell		109									
Electorate: 12,666 Valid: 6,124 (48.97%) Spoilt: 164 Quota: 1,021 Turnout: 6,202

=== Cork North-West ===
Cork North-West: 5 seats
Party	Candidate	FPv%	Count						
Party	Candidate	FPv%	1	2	3	4	5	6	7
Fianna Fáil	Dan Wallace TD*		1,888						
Fine Gael	Liam Burke TD*		1,007	1,077	1,142				
Labour	Gerry O'Sullivan*		775	828	857	1,006	1,066	1,102	1,108
Workers' Party	Jimmy Homan		690	732	775	805	909	939	941
Fianna Fáil	Tim Falvey		574	781	800	817	862	1,229	
Fianna Fáil	Dave McCarthy		521	705	714	727	784	1,007	1,091
Fianna Fáil	Martin A. Harvey		514	658	667	694	730		
Sinn Féin	Sean Walsh		347	366	382	392			
Fine Gael	Con Fitzpatrick		277	280	333				
Fine Gael	Sheila McGarry		159	185					
Communist	Bill McGarry		69	72					
Electorate: 14,358 Valid: 6,821 (48.22%) Spoilt: 102 Quota: 1,137 Turnout: 6,923

=== Cork South-Central ===
Cork South-Central: 5 seats
Party	Candidate	FPv%	Count														
Party	Candidate	FPv%	1	2	3	4	5	6	7	8	9	10	11	12	13	14	15
Fianna Fáil	Pearse Wyse TD		1,295														
Fine Gael	Denis Cregan*		809	818	823	828	915	924	926	983	993	1,064	1,119	1,121	1,191		
Fianna Fáil	Micheál Martin		788	815	818	824	829	840	907	933	1,069	1,102	1,167				
Sinn Féin	Peadar Beecher		465	467	472	495	497	507	510	512	518	522	572	572			
Labour	John Murray		464	469	475	479	482	493	500	503	506	676	737	740	809	988	1,000
Workers' Party	Kathleen Lynch		412	415	422	434	437	460	469	475	480	515	574	578	748	804	822
Fianna Fáil	Michael Finn		406	440	440	447	451	458	492	499	584	597	643	664	731	787	804
Fine Gael	Dan Morrissey*		396	402	403	409	429	435	443	523	533	587	621	623	638		
Labour	Pat Dawson*		365	369	372	380	392	409	418	432	442						
Independent	Fred Penney		305	312	324	358	362	420	424	434	443	464					
Fianna Fáil	Sean O'Reilly*		191	226	231	239	243	246	303	307							
Fianna Fáil	Christopher O'Connor		183	203	206	211	212	219									
Fine Gael	Sarah Madden		182	183	185	189	212	224	226								
Fine Gael	John Cahill*		176	177	177	179											
Green	Patrick Cotter		162	163	173	187	190										
Fianna Fáil	Finbarr O'Connor		137	140	147												
Independent	Pat O'Connor		70	72													
Electorate: 14,329 Valid: 6,806 (48.49%) Spoilt: 142 Quota: 1,135 Turnout: 6,948

=== Cork South-East ===
Cork South-East: 6 seats
Party	Candidate	FPv%	Count									
Party	Candidate	FPv%	1	2	3	4	5	6	7	8	9	10
Fine Gael	Jim Corr*		1,673									
Independent	Sean Beausang*		1,241									
Fianna Fáil	Chrissie Aherne*		999	1,017	1,080	1,098	1,105	1,124	1,183	1,350		
Fianna Fáil	Donal Counihan*		854	878	912	918	921	936	956	1,115	1,193	1,237
Fine Gael	Ted McCarthy		665	785	793	876	881	905	923	949	1,079	1,084
Fianna Fáil	Chris Coughlan		622	649	675	680	684	690	710	818	864	941
Fine Gael	John Blair		551	733	741	826	831	855	872	889	1,011	1,016
Fianna Fáil	Michael Lombard*		492	501	531	532	534	571	597			
Workers' Party	Sean McCarthy		346	352	353	357	361	390				
Labour	Tom O'Sullivan		310	323	330	340	343	511	617	654		
Labour	Frank Kerrigan		307	320	323	339	342					
Fine Gael	Philip Travers		191	241	241							
Fianna Fáil	Ann Hynes		181	187								
Electorate: 19,081 Valid: 8,432 (44.79%) Spoilt: 114 Quota: 1,212 Turnout: 8,546

=== Cork South-West ===
Cork South-West: 5 seats
Party	Candidate	FPv%	Count										
Party	Candidate	FPv%	1	2	3	4	5	6	7	8	9	10	11
Fianna Fáil	John Dennehy*		1,448										
Fine Gael	Brian Bermingham*		892	901	909	914	918	963	994	1,307			
Independent	Patrick Murray		689	830	860	934	957	992	1,221	1,328			
Fianna Fáil	Owen Curtin*		658	741	748	757	776	804	1,070	1,095	1,098	1,537	
Labour	Toddy O'Sullivan TD*		655	681	719	737	777	837	860	938	947	1,020	1,047
Fine Gael	Niall Hartnett		631	636	648	649	650	678	708	834	910	959	999
Fianna Fáil	Jarlath Killilea		568	613	617	623	653	666	751	767	768		
Fine Gael	Harry Anthony		537	545	549	557	560	589	595				
Fianna Fáil	Phil Cummins		439	477	481	490	506	518					
Green	Sean Dunne		331	335	348	362	403						
Sinn Féin	James McBarron		214	217	221	239							
Independent	Finbarr O'Connor		119	122	126								
Labour	Noel Dempsey		107	108									
Electorate: 15,555 Valid: 7,288 (47.45%) Spoilt: 93 Quota: 1,215 Turnout: 7,381
