= Kieran McCarthy =

Kieran McCarthy may refer to:

- Kieran McCarthy (Northern Ireland politician) (born 1942), Alliance Party of Northern Ireland politician, member of the Northern Ireland Assembly
- Kieran McCarthy (Republic of Ireland politician) (born 1977), Irish independent politician and lord mayor of Cork
