= Donal Counihan =

Irish politician (1941–2026)

Lord Mayor of Cork
- In office 2007–2008

Personal details
- Born: 27 May 1941 Cork, Ireland
- Died: 27 April 2026 (aged 84) Cork, Ireland
- Party: Fianna Fáil

Donal Counihan (27 May 1941 – 27 April 2026) was an Irish politician.

== Early life and career ==
Born in Blackrock, Counihan was a lifelong member of Blackrock National Hurling Club and played on the club's first under-16 team to win a city championship. He canvassed for Éamon de Valera as a young boy and became a Fianna Fáil party activist in 1959.

Counihan was elected to Cork Corporation for the city's south-east ward in 1979. He was re-elected in 1985 but lost his seat in 1991. He returned to the Corporation in 1999. Counihan was elected Lord Mayor of Cork in 2007. His one-year term saw him confer the freedom of the city on former Taoiseach Albert Reynolds and British Prime Minister John Major in recognition of their roles in the peace process. His political career ended in 2009, when he failed in his bid to be re-elected to the rebranded Cork City Council.

== Death ==
Counihan died in Cork on 27 April 2026, at the age of 84.

Civic offices
Preceded by Michael Ahern	Lord Mayor of Cork; 2008–2009	Succeeded by Brian Bermingham
