= Mick Barry (Irish politician) =

Irish politician (born 1964)

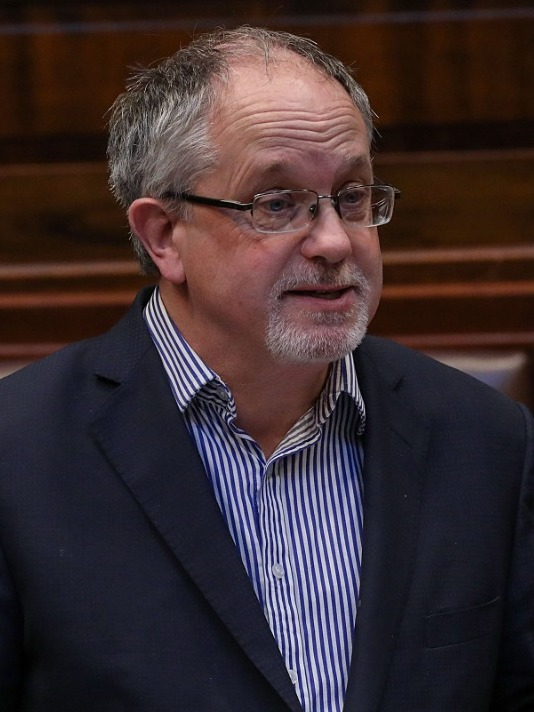
- Barry in 2022

Teachta Dála
- In office February 2016 – November 2024
- Constituency: Cork North-Central

Personal details
- Born: 17 September 1964 (age 61) Columbus, Ohio, U.S.
- Party: Socialist Party
- Other political affiliations: People Before Profit–Solidarity; Solidarity; Labour Party (until 1989)
- Education: Dublin Institute of Technology

Mick Barry (born 17 September 1964) is an Irish People Before Profit–Solidarity politician who was a Teachta Dála (TD) for the Cork North-Central constituency from 2016 to 2024.

According to the Irish Examiner, Barry was "a leading figure in the Cork and national campaigns" against household and water charges in the 2010s.

== Personal life ==
Barry was born in Columbus, Ohio in 1964. His family returned to Ireland in 1971 when he was 8 years old, and moved to Rathfarnham in Dublin. Barry moved to Cork city in 1991 and has remained a resident ever since, living in the suburb of Blackpool.

== Political career ==
=== 1989 to 2016 ===
Dick Spring expelled Barry, alongside Joe Higgins, Clare Daly, Ruth Coppinger and 10 others, from the Labour Party in 1989 for their membership of the Militant tendency.

Barry was first elected as a member of Cork City Council in June 2004 (as a Socialist Party candidate) and re-elected in June 2009 and May 2014 (both times on the first count). He also stood as a candidate in the Cork North-Central constituency at the 2002, 2007 and 2011 general elections.

On 1 May 2013, gardaí arrested five members of the Campaign Against Home and Water Taxes, including Barry and fellow Cork City Councillor Ted Tynan of the Workers' Party, during a midday protest inside the St Patrick's Street branch of the Bank of Ireland in the city. People gathered on the street. Cllr Tynan said he felt a need to stand up against austerity.

In the 2010s Barry campaigned on a number of issues locally and nationally, notably the Anti-Bin Tax Campaign with the Householders Against Service Charges (HASC) in Cork, In support of local services in the Cork area such as the cutbacks in bus services, and against the building of a private hospital on the public grounds of Cork University Hospital, and social housing. He called for a ban on home repossessions and considered a controversial Gateway employment scheme to be "slave labour". He called for standing orders to be suspended and proposed a motion condemning the jailing of five activists opposing a proposed tax on water.

=== 2016 to 2024: Dáil Éireann ===
A founding member of the Anti-Austerity Alliance (AAA), Barry was elected for the AAA–PBP group, at the 2016 general election, on his fourth attempt. At the 2020 general election, he was re-elected as a Solidarity–People Before Profit TD.

He lost his seat by 39 votes (revised from 35 following a partial recount) to Labour candidate Eoghan Kenny in count 17 of the 2024 general election. Under the provisions of the Electoral Act, 1992, Barry requested a recount, though later withdrew the request. Constituency boundary changes prior to the 2024 election moved Mallow, Kenny's hometown, from Cork East to Cork North-Central.

Dáil	Election	Deputy (Party)	Deputy (Party)	Deputy (Party)	Deputy (Party)	Deputy (Party)
22nd	1981	Toddy O'Sullivan (Lab)	Liam Burke (FG)	Denis Lyons (FF)	Bernard Allen (FG)	Seán French (FF)
23rd	1982 (Feb)	Toddy O'Sullivan (Lab)	Liam Burke (FG)	Denis Lyons (FF)	Bernard Allen (FG)	Seán French (FF)
24th	1982 (Nov)	Toddy O'Sullivan (Lab)	Liam Burke (FG)	Denis Lyons (FF)	Bernard Allen (FG)	Dan Wallace (FF)
25th	1987	Máirín Quill (PDs)	Liam Burke (FG)	Denis Lyons (FF)	Bernard Allen (FG)	Dan Wallace (FF)
26th	1989	Máirín Quill (PDs)	Gerry O'Sullivan (Lab)	Denis Lyons (FF)	Bernard Allen (FG)	Dan Wallace (FF)
27th	1992	Máirín Quill (PDs)	Gerry O'Sullivan (Lab)	Liam Burke (FG)	Bernard Allen (FG)	Dan Wallace (FF)
27th	1994 by-election	Máirín Quill (PDs)	Kathleen Lynch (DL)	Liam Burke (FG)	Bernard Allen (FG)	Dan Wallace (FF)
28th	1997	Billy Kelleher (FF)	Noel O'Flynn (FF)	Liam Burke (FG)	Bernard Allen (FG)	Dan Wallace (FF)
29th	2002	Billy Kelleher (FF)	Noel O'Flynn (FF)	Kathleen Lynch (Lab)	Bernard Allen (FG)	Dan Wallace (FF)
30th	2007	Billy Kelleher (FF)	Noel O'Flynn (FF)	Kathleen Lynch (Lab)	Bernard Allen (FG)	4 seats from 2007
31st	2011	Billy Kelleher (FF)	Jonathan O'Brien (SF)	Kathleen Lynch (Lab)	Dara Murphy (FG)	4 seats from 2007
32nd	2016	Billy Kelleher (FF)	Jonathan O'Brien (SF)	Mick Barry (AAA–PBP)	Dara Murphy (FG)	4 seats from 2007
32nd	2019 by-election	Pádraig O'Sullivan (FF)	Jonathan O'Brien (SF)	Mick Barry (AAA–PBP)	Dara Murphy (FG)	4 seats from 2007
33rd	2020	Pádraig O'Sullivan (FF)	Thomas Gould (SF)	Mick Barry (S–PBP)	Colm Burke (FG)	4 seats from 2007
34th	2024	Pádraig O'Sullivan (FF)	Thomas Gould (SF)	Eoghan Kenny (Lab)	Colm Burke (FG)	Ken O'Flynn (II)
