= Tim Falvey =

Irish politician (1934–2021)

Lord Mayor of Cork
- In office 11 July 1994 – 10 July 1995
- Preceded by: John Murray
- Succeeded by: Joe O'Callaghan

Personal details
- Born: Timothy Falvey; 1934 Cork, Ireland
- Died: 15 May 2021 (aged 87) Cork, Ireland
- Party: Fianna Fáil
- Spouse: Bina O'Callaghan
- Children: 6, including Pat
- Education: The North Monastery
- Occupation: Businessman

Timothy Falvey (1934 – 15 May 2021) was an Irish Fianna Fáil politician who served as Lord Mayor of Cork from 1994 to 1995. He served as a member of Cork City Council for the Cork North West Ward from 1992 to 2004.

== Biography ==
Born on the northside of Cork city, Falvey was educated at the North Monastery before spending over 50 years working in the building trade. A lifelong member of the Fianna Fáil party, he was co-opted on to Cork City Council in 1992 to fill the vacancy created by Dan Wallace's promotion to Minister of State, having failed to be elected at the 1991 local election. Falvey defeated Kathleen Lynch to be elected Lord Mayor of Cork in 1994. He was successful in securing his re-election to the council in 1999.

Falvey died at his home in Cork on 15 May 2021, aged 87. He was predeceased by his wife of over 60 years and is survived by his six children, including Pat.

Civic offices
Preceded by John Murray	Lord Mayor of Cork; 1994–1995	Succeeded by Joe O'Callaghan
