= Michael O'Connell (politician) =

Irish politician

Lord Mayor of Cork
- In office June 2010 – 24 June 2011
- Preceded by: Dara Murphy
- Succeeded by: Terry Shannon

Cork City Councillor
- In office June 1999 – May 2014
- Constituency: Cork North-West

Personal details
- Born: Cork
- Party: Labour Party

Michael O'Connell is an Irish Labour Party politician and former Lord Mayor of Cork. He was born in Cork and represented the North West electoral area. He was first elected onto the Cork City Council in 1999, and served as Deputy Lord Mayor in 2006–2007. He has been a member of many Committees of Council and in June 2005 was elected Chair of the Cork City housing committee. He lost his seat at the 2014 Local Elections.

Born in 1952, he was originally from Farranferris Place in Farranree, on the north side of Cork City, he attended the North Monastery Secondary School. By 2010, O’Connell was living in Shanakiel, representing the North-West ward, where he was first elected in 1999. He was a member of the Workers' Party in the 1980s and later joined the Democratic Left. While he was involved in campaigns for both parties, it was only when he joined the Labour Party that he was persuaded to run for office and was subsequently elected. He served as chairperson of the South West Regional Authority. As of 2009, he was outgoing chairman of the board of Gurranabraher Credit Union (GCU).

He succeeded Dara Murphy as Lord Mayor of Cork in 2010, winning the position with six Labour votes along with the support of six members of Fine Gael and four members of Fianna Fáil, under an agreement that has seen the three parties share the mayoralty for the previous 3 decades in Cork City. Independent councillor Kieran McCarthy also supported O’Connell. His term as Lord Mayor coincided with the historic visit of reigning British monarch, Queen Elizabeth II to Cork, to whom he presented a specially commissioned brooch.

Civic offices
| Preceded by Dara Murphy | Lord Mayor of Cork; 2010–2011 | Succeeded by Terry Shannon |
