= Dara Murphy =

Irish former politician (born 1969)

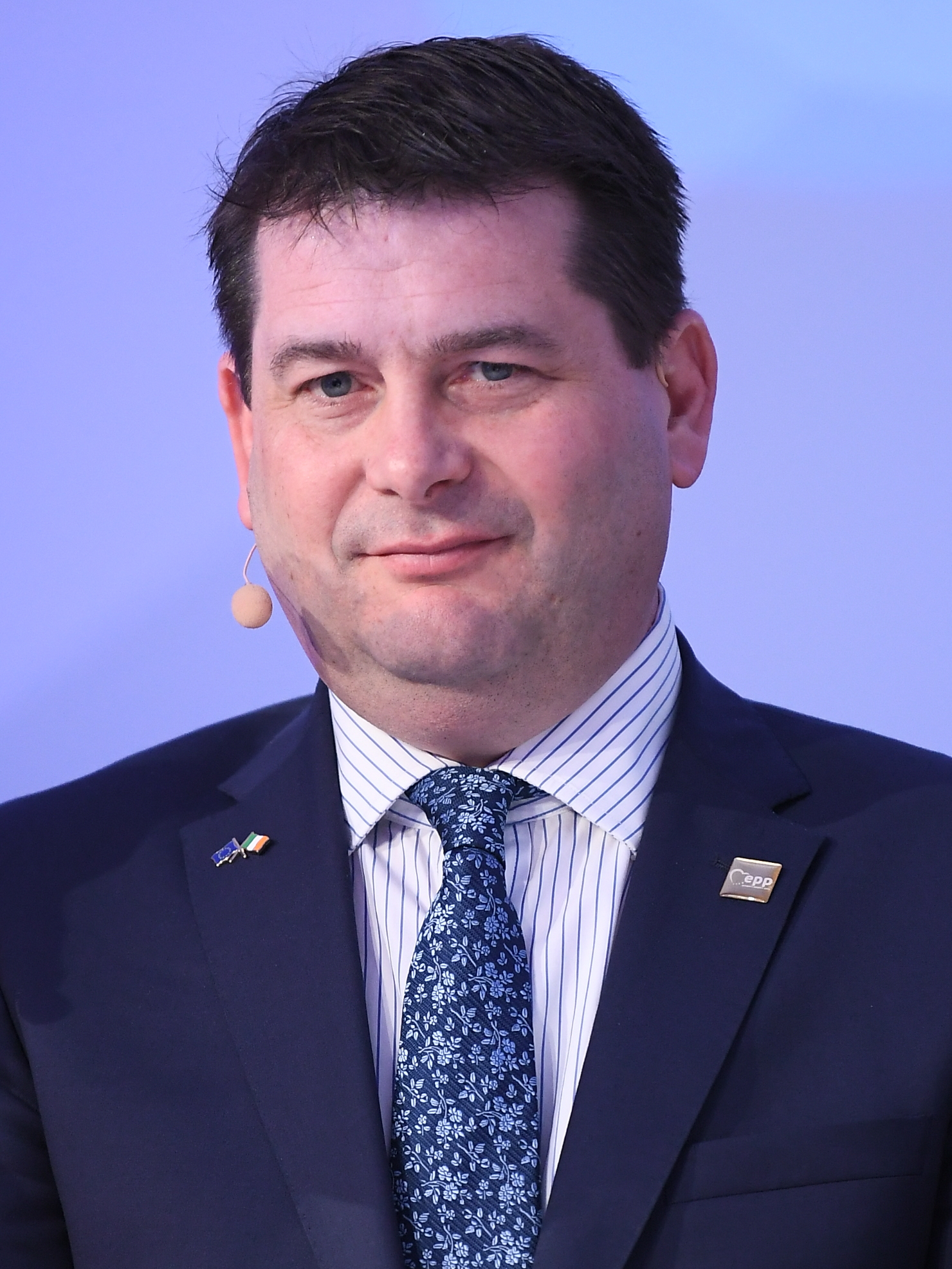
- Murphy in 2017

Minister of State
- 2014–2017: European Affairs and Data Protection
- 2014–2017: Justice and Equality
- 2014–2017: Foreign Affairs and Trade

Teachta Dála
- In office February 2011 – 3 December 2019
- Constituency: Cork North-Central

Personal details
- Born: 2 December 1969 (age 56) Glanmire, County Cork, Ireland
- Party: Fine Gael
- Spouse: Tanya Murphy (m. 1999)
- Children: 3
- Education: University College Cork

Dara Murphy (born 2 December 1969) is an Irish former Fine Gael politician who served as a Minister of State from 2014 to 2017 and Lord Mayor of Cork from 2009 to 2010. He served as a Teachta Dála (TD) for the Cork North-Central constituency from 2011 to 2019.

He resigned as a TD in December 2019 in the wake of a controversy about his lack of attendance in Dáil Éireann, in order to take a full-time position in the administration of the European Union.

== Early and personal life ==
Murphy is from Mayfield, Cork. After attending Christian Brothers College, he studied economics at University College Cork from 1988, but failed his final exams; he finally graduated in 2015 after completing the necessary modules remotely. He started several catering businesses, the first while still in college; these prospered until the 2008 recession, when they folded, leaving him with tax debts which were settled in subsequent years.

== Political career ==
Murphy was appointed to the National Economic and Social Council by the Taoiseach John Bruton in October 1996, serving until the end of 1997. He was elected to Cork City Council in 2004 and 2009, serving as Deputy Lord Mayor from 2005 to 2006 and Lord Mayor from 2009 to 2010. He also served as the first Chair of the Cork Joint Policing Committee. He was elected to the Dáil for Cork North-Central at the 2011 general election, vacating his seat in Cork City Council.

On 15 July 2014, on the nomination of Taoiseach Enda Kenny, Murphy was appointed by the Fine Gael–Labour coalition government as Minister of State at the Department of the Taoiseach, at the Department of Foreign Affairs and Trade and at the Department of Justice and Equality, with special responsibility as Minister of State for European Affairs and for data protection. On 19 May 2016, on the nomination of Taoiseach Enda Kenny, he was appointed by the Fine Gael–Independent minority government to the same positions, with additional responsibility for the EU Digital Single Market, He was not appointed to ministerial position by Leo Varadkar when he became Taoiseach in June 2017.

In October 2017, Murphy was appointed Campaign Director for the European People's Party in the 2019 European Parliament election.

In May 2018, Murphy announced that he intended to retire from Dáil Éireann at the next general election.

In November 2019, Murphy revealed that he was resigning as a TD at the end of 2019 to take up a senior position in the European Commission. However, this was overshadowed by the controversy surrounding the expenses scandal, which saw him collect his Dáil Éireann expenses. From October 2017, Murphy was mainly based in Brussels where he worked with the European People's Party. During this period he drew his full Dáil salary of €94,500 and his full parliamentary standard allowances of €51,600 each year. Murphy had the lowest attendance rate in the Dáil on sitting days by a considerable margin during 2018 and 2019; attending on 42 days out of 104 in 2018, and 24 out of 70 until the end of September 2019.

Murphy resigned as a TD on 3 December 2019.

== Later career ==
In 2021, Murphy joined Rasmussen Global as a senior adviser.

Political offices
Preceded by Paschal Donohoe	Minister of State for European Affairs; 2014–2017	Succeeded by Helen McEntee
Civic offices
Preceded by Brian Bermingham	Lord Mayor of Cork; 2009–2010	Succeeded by Mick O'Connell

Dáil	Election	Deputy (Party)	Deputy (Party)	Deputy (Party)	Deputy (Party)	Deputy (Party)
22nd	1981	Toddy O'Sullivan (Lab)	Liam Burke (FG)	Denis Lyons (FF)	Bernard Allen (FG)	Seán French (FF)
23rd	1982 (Feb)	Toddy O'Sullivan (Lab)	Liam Burke (FG)	Denis Lyons (FF)	Bernard Allen (FG)	Seán French (FF)
24th	1982 (Nov)	Toddy O'Sullivan (Lab)	Liam Burke (FG)	Denis Lyons (FF)	Bernard Allen (FG)	Dan Wallace (FF)
25th	1987	Máirín Quill (PDs)	Liam Burke (FG)	Denis Lyons (FF)	Bernard Allen (FG)	Dan Wallace (FF)
26th	1989	Máirín Quill (PDs)	Gerry O'Sullivan (Lab)	Denis Lyons (FF)	Bernard Allen (FG)	Dan Wallace (FF)
27th	1992	Máirín Quill (PDs)	Gerry O'Sullivan (Lab)	Liam Burke (FG)	Bernard Allen (FG)	Dan Wallace (FF)
27th	1994 by-election	Máirín Quill (PDs)	Kathleen Lynch (DL)	Liam Burke (FG)	Bernard Allen (FG)	Dan Wallace (FF)
28th	1997	Billy Kelleher (FF)	Noel O'Flynn (FF)	Liam Burke (FG)	Bernard Allen (FG)	Dan Wallace (FF)
29th	2002	Billy Kelleher (FF)	Noel O'Flynn (FF)	Kathleen Lynch (Lab)	Bernard Allen (FG)	Dan Wallace (FF)
30th	2007	Billy Kelleher (FF)	Noel O'Flynn (FF)	Kathleen Lynch (Lab)	Bernard Allen (FG)	4 seats from 2007
31st	2011	Billy Kelleher (FF)	Jonathan O'Brien (SF)	Kathleen Lynch (Lab)	Dara Murphy (FG)	4 seats from 2007
32nd	2016	Billy Kelleher (FF)	Jonathan O'Brien (SF)	Mick Barry (AAA–PBP)	Dara Murphy (FG)	4 seats from 2007
32nd	2019 by-election	Pádraig O'Sullivan (FF)	Jonathan O'Brien (SF)	Mick Barry (AAA–PBP)	Dara Murphy (FG)	4 seats from 2007
33rd	2020	Pádraig O'Sullivan (FF)	Thomas Gould (SF)	Mick Barry (S–PBP)	Colm Burke (FG)	4 seats from 2007
34th	2024	Pádraig O'Sullivan (FF)	Thomas Gould (SF)	Eoghan Kenny (Lab)	Colm Burke (FG)	Ken O'Flynn (II)
