= Tom O'Driscoll =

Irish politician

Lord Mayor of Cork
- In office 2001–2002
- Preceded by: P.J. Hourican
- Succeeded by: John Kelleher

Tom O'Driscoll is an Irish local politician who previously served as Fianna Fáil Councillor on Cork City Council, representing the Cork City South Central Local Electoral Area. He was first elected at the 1991 Cork Corporation election and retained his seat until he lost his seat at the 2009 elections. A communications lecturer at St John's College of Further Education in Cork he served as Lord Mayor of Cork from 2001 to 2002. O'Driscoll regained his seat at the 2014 local elections. He did not contest the 2019 local elections.

Civic offices
Preceded by P.J. Hourican	Lord Mayor of Cork; 2001–2002	Succeeded by John Kelleher
