= Brian Bermingham =

Irish politician (1946 or 1947 – 2024)

Cork City Councillor
- In office June 1979 – May 2014
- Constituency: Cork South West

Lord Mayor of Cork
- In office 23 June 2008 – 23 June 2009
- Preceded by: Donal Counihan
- Succeeded by: Dara Murphy

Personal details
- Born: 1946 or 1947 Cork, Ireland
- Died: 21 September 2024 (aged 77) Spain
- Party: Fine Gael
- Other political affiliations: Progressive Democrats (1988–1998)
- Spouse: Elma Bermingham
- Children: 5
- Education: University College Cork

Brian Bermingham (1946 or 1947 – 21 September 2024) was an Irish Fine Gael politician and Cork City Council member. He was the Lord Mayor of Cork from 2008 to 2009. He successfully contested seven local government elections in the Cork South West local electoral area between 1979 and 2009.

== Political career ==
At age 14 he joined Young Fine Gael. He was first elected to Cork City Council in 1979 alongside Donal Counihan, Denis Cregan and Máirín Quill. In 1988, he joined the Progressive Democrats and in June 1991 he was elected for the Cork South West area with 861 first preference votes (10.41%). After ten years with the Progressive Democrats he moved back to Fine Gael. He contested the 1999 local elections for Fine Gael, and was elected. He was elected to the city council again in 2004.

He was elected as Lord Mayor of Cork in June 2008, 40 years after his father John Bermingham, who was elected in 1968. In 2009, he hosted a Lord Mayors reception to mark the 125th anniversary of the Gaelic Athletic Association. He was again elected to the council for Cork South West at the 2009 local elections. He retired from politics in 2014, and did not contest the 2014 local elections.

Bermingham died in Spain on 21 September 2024, at the age of 77.

Civic offices
Preceded by Donal Counihan	Lord Mayor of Cork; 2008–2009	Succeeded by Dara Murphy
