= Mary Shields =

Irish politician

Mary Shields is a local politician who was a Fianna Fáil councillor on Cork City Council representing the Cork South West Local Electoral Area. She was first elected at the 1999 Irish local elections and retained her seat at each subsequent election through to 2014. From the Bishopstown area of Cork she is a stay-at-home-mother. She served as Lord Mayor of Cork from 2014 to 2015, succeeding Catherine Clancy. This was the first time in Cork's history that two women had succeeded each other to the office of Lord Mayor.

Civic offices
Preceded by Catherine Clancy	Lord Mayor of Cork; 2014–2015	Succeeded by Chris O'Leary
