= Chris O'Leary =

Irish politician

Cllr Chris O'Leary
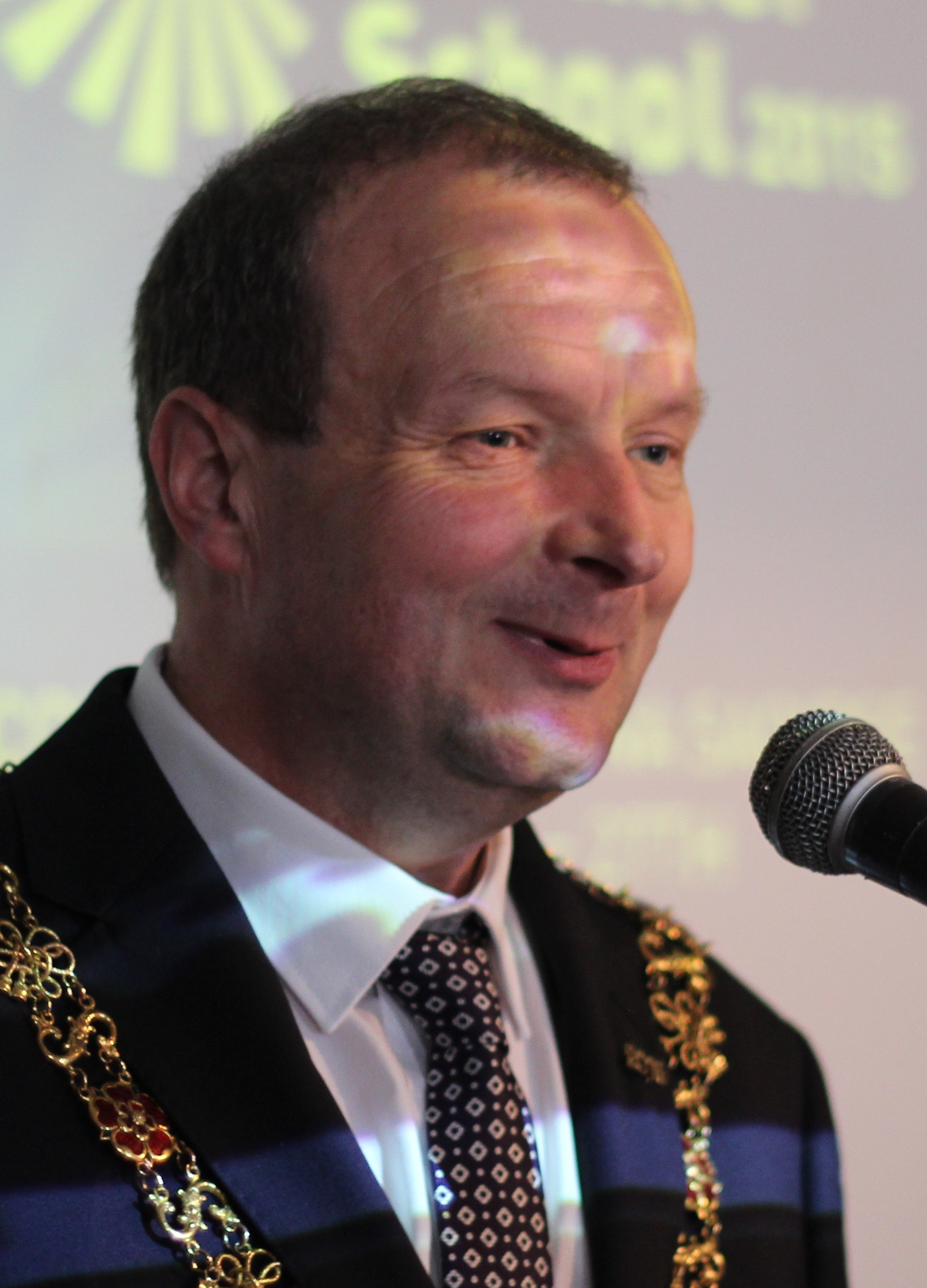
- O'Leary in 2015

Lord Mayor of Cork
- In office June 2015 – June 2016

Cork City Councillor
- Incumbent
- Assumed office June 2002
- Constituency: Cork City South East

Personal details
- Party: Sinn Féin (2010–present)
- Other political affiliations: Independent (2009–10); Green Party (until 2009)

Chris O'Leary is an Irish Sinn Féin politician. He was formerly a Cork City Councillor and Lord Mayor of Cork. With a background in community development projects, in 2002 he was co-opted into the council to replace his Green Party colleague Dan Boyle who had been elected a TD. O'Leary left the Green Party in 2009, and was an independent councillor prior to joining Sinn Féin in 2010. He became Lord Mayor of Cork in June 2015, in the second year of a D'Hondt method rotation agreed for the office in 2014. He was Lord Mayor of Cork from June 2015 to June 2016, when he was replaced by Fine Gael politician Des Cahill. In the 2019 Irish local elections, O'Leary was not reelected, one of two Sinn Féin councillors to lose seats on Cork City Council.

His brother Don O'Leary was also a Sinn Féin Councillor for Cork City.

O'Leary is a patron of the People's Movement.

Civic offices
Preceded by Mary Shields	Lord Mayor of Cork; 2015–2016	Succeeded by Des Cahill
