= Kieran McCarthy (Republic of Ireland politician) =

Irish politician

Cllr Kieran McCarthy
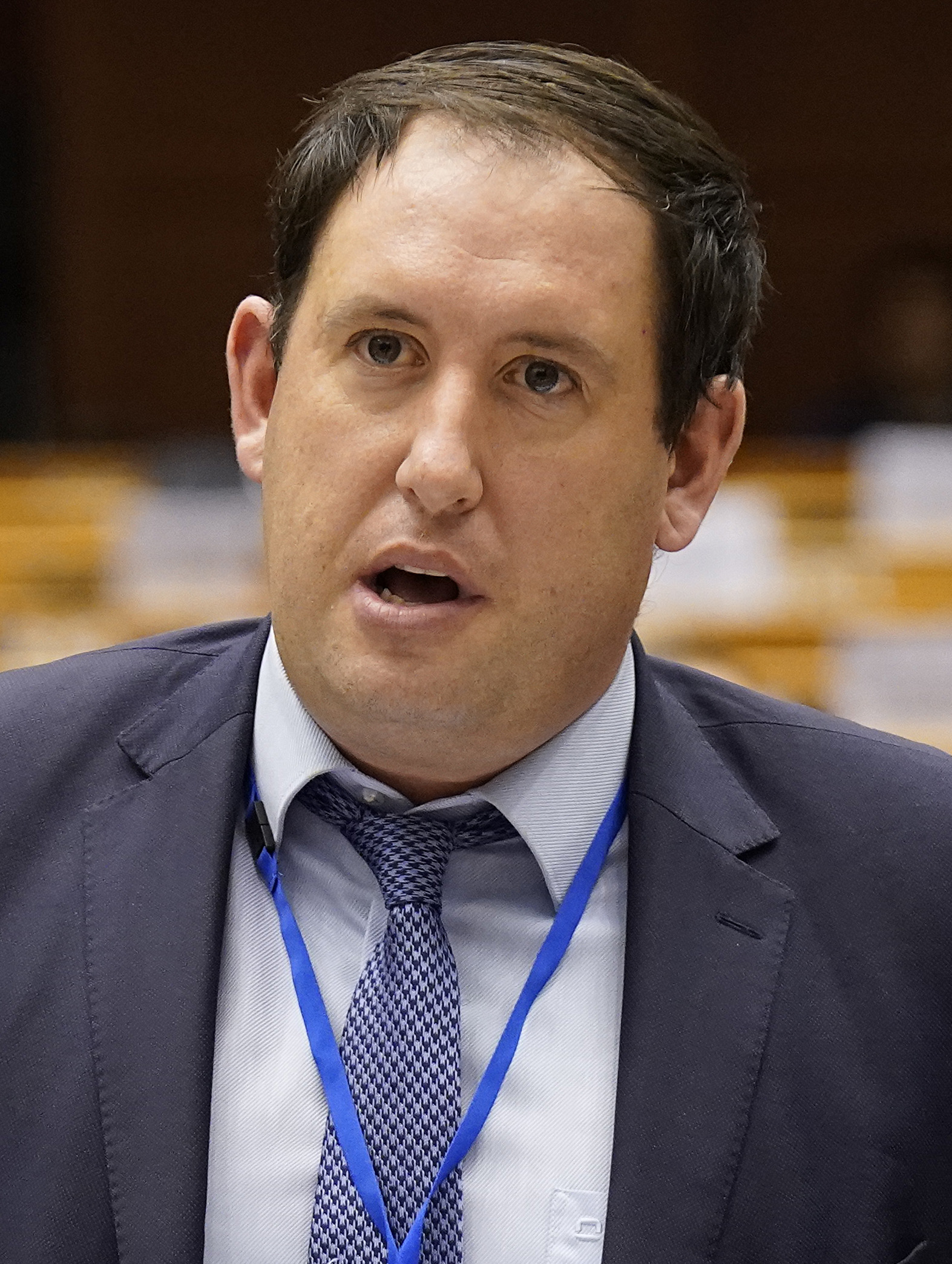
- McCarthy in 2019

Lord Mayor of Cork
- In office 23 June 2023 – 21 June 2024
- Preceded by: Deirdre Forde
- Succeeded by: Dan Boyle

Cork City Councillor
- Incumbent
- Assumed office June 2009
- Constituency: Cork City South East

Personal details
- Born: 1977 (age 48–49)
- Party: Independent
- Education: University College Cork
- Website: kieranmccarthy.ie

Kieran McCarthy (born 1977) is an Irish independent politician who served as Lord Mayor of Cork from 2023 to 2024. He has been a Cork City Councillor for the Cork City South East electoral area since 2009.

== Early life and education ==
Born and raised in Ballinlough, Cork City, McCarthy attended Coláiste Chríost Rí and later studied Archaeology and Geography at University College Cork, earning a Joint Honours BA degree. He has written a number of books on Cork and has organised local historical walking tours.

== Political career ==
McCarthy, who has described his politics as being "neither left nor right", was first elected to Cork City Council in June 2009, representing the south-east ward.

=== Lord Mayor of Cork (2023–2024) ===
On 23 June 2023, McCarthy was elected Lord Mayor of Cork, a role he held until 21 June 2024. At the start of his tenure, he stated that his priorities included reducing homelessness, advancing social and affordable housing projects, and issues such as climate change. In a statement published at the time of his election, he advocated for sustainable mobility, enhanced city amenities, and the integration of sustainable development goals into urban planning.

=== 2025 presidential election ===
On 6 September 2025, McCarthy announced that he intended to seek nominations from several city and county councils to run in the 2025 Irish presidential election. McCarthy stated he was seeking to become president because he believes the role holds "untapped potential" that was not fully explored by past candidates. He said his aims were to promote cultural heritage, strengthen links with Ireland's diaspora and "[link] in local authorities". While he secured the backing of one council, Waterford City and County Council, he did not receive the four council nominations necessary to make it onto the ballot. He "bowed out" of the nomination process on 22 September.
