= Seán Martin =

Fianna Fáil Councillor

Seán Martin is a Fianna Fáil councillor on Cork City Council representing the Cork City South Central local electoral area. He was co-opted to the council in July 1997 to the seat vacated by his brother, Micheál Martin, following his ministerial appointment after the 1997 general election. Seán Martin retained his seat at the 1999 Irish local elections and at each subsequent election. He works with the ESB and served as Lord Mayor of Cork from 2004 to 2005.

As of 2021, Martin is the leader of Fianna Fáil on Cork City Council and serves on several committees of the council. He represents Cork City Council on the board of the Association of Irish Local Government, the Cork Education and Training Board (ETB) and Cork Film Festival.

Civic offices
Preceded by Colm Burke	Lord Mayor of Cork; 2004–2005	Succeeded by Deirdre Clune
