= Máirín Quill =

Irish politician (1936–2025)

Senator
- In office 17 September 1997 – 12 September 2002
- Constituency: Nominated by the Taoiseach

Teachta Dála
- In office February 1987 – June 1997
- Constituency: Cork North-Central

Personal details
- Born: 15 September 1936 County Kerry, Ireland
- Died: 18 December 2025 (aged 89) Cork, Ireland
- Party: Progressive Democrats (1985–2009)
- Other political affiliations: Fianna Fáil (1977–1985)
- Education: Mary Immaculate College; University College Cork

Máirín Quill (15 September 1936 – 18 December 2025) was an Irish politician. She served as a senator from 1997 to 2002, after being nominated by the Taoiseach, and was a Teachta Dála (TD) for the Cork North-Central constituency from 1987 to 1997.

== Life and career ==
Quill was born on a farm in Kilgarvan, County Kerry, in 1936. A schoolteacher, she qualified as a primary school teacher from Mary Immaculate College, Limerick; she followed her teaching diploma by studying by night at University College Cork for a degree in English and history, and then a Higher Diploma in Education. She taught English and history at St Vincent's Secondary School in Cork City.

Quill contested the Cork City constituency at the 1977 general election and Cork North-Central at the 1981 general election, each time unsuccessfully as a Fianna Fáil candidate. She was elected to Dáil Éireann for the Cork North-Central constituency at the 1987 general election, and was one of 14 Progressive Democrats TDs resulting from that party's first general election.

Quill retained her seat in two successive general elections, but lost it at the 1997 general election. She was then nominated by the Taoiseach, Bertie Ahern, to the 21st Seanad. She did not contest the 2002 general election.

From 1979 until 2009, she was a member of Cork City Council, representing the North East area. She did not contest the 2009 local elections.

Quill died on 18 December 2025, at the age of 89.

Dáil	Election	Deputy (Party)	Deputy (Party)	Deputy (Party)	Deputy (Party)	Deputy (Party)
22nd	1981	Toddy O'Sullivan (Lab)	Liam Burke (FG)	Denis Lyons (FF)	Bernard Allen (FG)	Seán French (FF)
23rd	1982 (Feb)	Toddy O'Sullivan (Lab)	Liam Burke (FG)	Denis Lyons (FF)	Bernard Allen (FG)	Seán French (FF)
24th	1982 (Nov)	Toddy O'Sullivan (Lab)	Liam Burke (FG)	Denis Lyons (FF)	Bernard Allen (FG)	Dan Wallace (FF)
25th	1987	Máirín Quill (PDs)	Liam Burke (FG)	Denis Lyons (FF)	Bernard Allen (FG)	Dan Wallace (FF)
26th	1989	Máirín Quill (PDs)	Gerry O'Sullivan (Lab)	Denis Lyons (FF)	Bernard Allen (FG)	Dan Wallace (FF)
27th	1992	Máirín Quill (PDs)	Gerry O'Sullivan (Lab)	Liam Burke (FG)	Bernard Allen (FG)	Dan Wallace (FF)
27th	1994 by-election	Máirín Quill (PDs)	Kathleen Lynch (DL)	Liam Burke (FG)	Bernard Allen (FG)	Dan Wallace (FF)
28th	1997	Billy Kelleher (FF)	Noel O'Flynn (FF)	Liam Burke (FG)	Bernard Allen (FG)	Dan Wallace (FF)
29th	2002	Billy Kelleher (FF)	Noel O'Flynn (FF)	Kathleen Lynch (Lab)	Bernard Allen (FG)	Dan Wallace (FF)
30th	2007	Billy Kelleher (FF)	Noel O'Flynn (FF)	Kathleen Lynch (Lab)	Bernard Allen (FG)	4 seats from 2007
31st	2011	Billy Kelleher (FF)	Jonathan O'Brien (SF)	Kathleen Lynch (Lab)	Dara Murphy (FG)	4 seats from 2007
32nd	2016	Billy Kelleher (FF)	Jonathan O'Brien (SF)	Mick Barry (AAA–PBP)	Dara Murphy (FG)	4 seats from 2007
32nd	2019 by-election	Pádraig O'Sullivan (FF)	Jonathan O'Brien (SF)	Mick Barry (AAA–PBP)	Dara Murphy (FG)	4 seats from 2007
33rd	2020	Pádraig O'Sullivan (FF)	Thomas Gould (SF)	Mick Barry (S–PBP)	Colm Burke (FG)	4 seats from 2007
34th	2024	Pádraig O'Sullivan (FF)	Thomas Gould (SF)	Eoghan Kenny (Lab)	Colm Burke (FG)	Ken O'Flynn (II)
