= Terry Shannon (politician) =

Irish politician

Cllr Terry Shannon
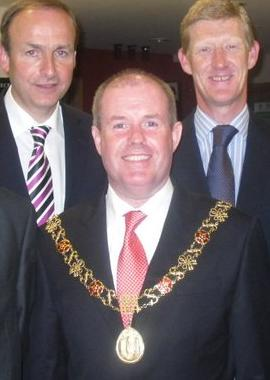
- Terry Shannon (middle) in 2011

Lord Mayor of Cork
- In office June 2011 – June 2012
- Preceded by: Michael O'Connell
- Succeeded by: John Buttimer

Cork City Councillor
- Incumbent
- Assumed office 1999
- Constituency: Cork South East

Personal details
- Born: 12 June 1962 (age 63) Cork, Ireland
- Party: Fianna Fáil
- Spouse: Ursula Shannon
- Children: 4

Terry Shannon (born 12 June 1962) is an Irish Fianna Fáil politician and a former Lord Mayor of Cork. He has served on Cork City Council since 1999, representing the South East electoral area. Prior to his election to the council, Shannon was a member of the Fianna Fáil National Youth Committee, chairperson of Cork North Central Ógra, and election agent to TD Micheál Martin. Shannon topped the poll in his first city council election with a 14.2% share of the vote. He has been re-elected five times, in 2004, 2009, 2014, 2019 and 2024. He was elected to the office of Lord Mayor on 24 June 2011, having previously served as Deputy Lord Mayor in 2009.

Civic offices
Preceded by Michael O'Connell	Lord Mayor of Cork; 2011–2012	Succeeded by John Buttimer
