= Denis Cregan =

Irish businessman and politician (born 1940)

Senator
- In office 17 February 1993 – 12 September 2002
- In office 13 May 1982 – 1 November 1989
- Constituency: Labour Panel

Personal details
- Born: 4 May 1940 (age 85) Cork, Ireland
- Party: Fine Gael
- Spouse: Mary Barry (m. 1962)
- Children: 7

Denis Cregan (born 4 May 1940) is an Irish businessman and former Fine Gael politician from Cork, who served for 17 years as a senator.

== Politics ==
A former branch vice-president of the Irish Transport and General Workers' Union, Cregan was a long-standing member of Cork City Council from 1979 to 2009, and was Lord Mayor of Cork from 1991 to 1992. He had unsuccessfully contested the Cork South-Central constituency at the 1981 and February 1982 general elections. He stood in the 1982 Seanad elections, winning a seat on the Labour Panel, which he held until his defeat in the 1989 elections to the 19th Seanad Éireann.

He was unsuccessful again when he stood again in Cork South-Central at the 1992 general election, but in the subsequent elections to the 20th Seanad he was re-elected on the Labour Panel. He was re-elected in 1997 to the 21st Seanad, but was narrowly defeated in the 2002 elections to the 22nd Seanad.

At the 2004 local elections, he held his seat on Cork City Council, though with a margin of less than 40 votes over the Sinn Féin candidate.

In January 2009 he announced his retirement from politics and did not contest the 2009 local elections.

== Personal life ==
From Bandon road, Cork, he was one of eight children and left school at 13. He and five of his brothers worked alongside their father at CIÉ's road haulage department. He did a variety of other jobs, including lorry helper, bus conductor and truck driver.

He opened his first Fish and chip shop in 1970 at his family home. In 2024, the chain called Dino's, has nine outlets in Cork city and county.

He married Mary Barry in 1962. They have seven children; six of whom are involved in the family business.

Civic offices
| Preceded by Frank Nash | Lord Mayor of Cork; 1991–1992 | Succeeded by Micheál Martin |
