= Jim Corr (politician) =

Irish politician (1934–2026)

Lord Mayor of Cork
- In office June 1996 – June 1997
- In office May 1979 – June 1980

Teachta Dála
- In office February 1982 – November 1982
- Constituency: Cork South-Central

Personal details
- Born: James A. Corr; 25 January 1934 Cork, Ireland
- Died: 18 November 2026 (aged 92) Cork, Ireland
- Party: Fine Gael
- Spouse: Lilian Corr
- Children: 4
- Education: University College Cork

James A. Corr (25 January 1934 – 18 November 2026) was an Irish Fine Gael politician who served as Lord Mayor of Cork from 1979 to 1980 and 1996 to 1997. He served as a Teachta Dála (TD) for the Cork South-Central from February 1982 to November 1982.

== Life and career ==
Corr was a member of Cork City Council from 1973 to 2014. He was first co-opted to the council (then called Cork Corporation) in 1973, and elected at the 1974 local elections. He was Lord Mayor of Cork in 1979 and 1996.

When the five-seat Cork South-Central constituency was created in 1980, Fine Gael's support was sufficient for two seats. Peter Barry was the party's senior TD; Corr had a rivalry with Hugh Coveney for the second Fine Gael seat. Coveney narrowly beat Corr at the 1981 general election, but Corr won by a larger margin in February 1982. Becoming disillusioned with Dáil politics, Corr stood aside in November 1982, with Coveney regaining the seat. Corr was to stand as a third Fine Gael candidate at the 1987 general election, but stood aside to avoid splitting the Fine Gael vote, though Coveney lost his seat in any event. Corr was unsuccessful at the 1989 and 1992 general elections.

He was unhappy that John Cushnahan was selected ahead of him as Fine Gael candidate in Munster at the 1989 European Parliament election. Corr stood unsuccessfully in Munster at the 1999 European Parliament election.

A graduate of University College Cork, Corr taught geography at Presentation Brothers College, and wrote a school textbook in 1972. He spent six years working in Nigeria. He was a trade union activist, and considered on the left wing of Fine Gael in the early 1980s. He was appointed to the Board of Bord Gáis in 1997. He was appointed chairman of the advisory board of European Cities Against Drugs in 2002.

Corr died on 18 November 2026, at the age of 92.

Civic offices
Preceded by Brian C. Sloane	Lord Mayor of Cork; 1979–1980	Succeeded by Toddy O'Sullivan
Preceded by Joe O'Callaghan	Lord Mayor of Cork; 1996–1997	Succeeded by Dave McCarthy

Dáil	Election	Deputy (Party)	Deputy (Party)	Deputy (Party)	Deputy (Party)	Deputy (Party)
22nd	1981	Eileen Desmond (Lab)	Gene Fitzgerald (FF)	Pearse Wyse (FF)	Hugh Coveney (FG)	Peter Barry (FG)
23rd	1982 (Feb)	Eileen Desmond (Lab)	Gene Fitzgerald (FF)	Pearse Wyse (FF)	Jim Corr (FG)	Peter Barry (FG)
24th	1982 (Nov)	Eileen Desmond (Lab)	Gene Fitzgerald (FF)	Pearse Wyse (FF)	Hugh Coveney (FG)	Peter Barry (FG)
25th	1987	Toddy O'Sullivan (Lab)	John Dennehy (FF)	Batt O'Keeffe (FF)	Pearse Wyse (PDs)	Peter Barry (FG)
26th	1989	Toddy O'Sullivan (Lab)	John Dennehy (FF)	Micheál Martin (FF)	Pearse Wyse (PDs)	Peter Barry (FG)
27th	1992	Toddy O'Sullivan (Lab)	Batt O'Keeffe (FF)	Micheál Martin (FF)	Pat Cox (PDs)	Peter Barry (FG)
27th	1994 by-election	Toddy O'Sullivan (Lab)	Batt O'Keeffe (FF)	Micheál Martin (FF)	Hugh Coveney (FG)	Peter Barry (FG)
28th	1997	John Dennehy (FF)	Batt O'Keeffe (FF)	Micheál Martin (FF)	Hugh Coveney (FG)	Deirdre Clune (FG)
28th	1998 by-election	John Dennehy (FF)	Batt O'Keeffe (FF)	Micheál Martin (FF)	Simon Coveney (FG)	Deirdre Clune (FG)
29th	2002	John Dennehy (FF)	Batt O'Keeffe (FF)	Micheál Martin (FF)	Simon Coveney (FG)	Dan Boyle (GP)
30th	2007	Ciarán Lynch (Lab)	Michael McGrath (FF)	Micheál Martin (FF)	Simon Coveney (FG)	Deirdre Clune (FG)
31st	2011	Ciarán Lynch (Lab)	Michael McGrath (FF)	Micheál Martin (FF)	Simon Coveney (FG)	Jerry Buttimer (FG)
32nd	2016	Donnchadh Ó Laoghaire (SF)	Michael McGrath (FF)	Micheál Martin (FF)	Simon Coveney (FG)	4 seats 2016–2024
33rd	2020	Donnchadh Ó Laoghaire (SF)	Michael McGrath (FF)	Micheál Martin (FF)	Simon Coveney (FG)	4 seats 2016–2024
34th	2024	Donnchadh Ó Laoghaire (SF)	Séamus McGrath (FF)	Micheál Martin (FF)	Jerry Buttimer (FG)	Pádraig Rice (SD)
