= Cork City Council =

Local authority of Cork city in Ireland

Cork City Council Comhairle Cathrach Chorcaí
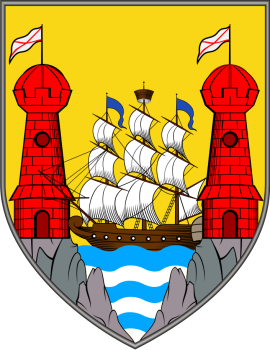

Type
- Type: City council

History
- Founded: 25 October 1840

Leadership
- Lord Mayor: Damian Boylan, FG

Structure
- Seats: 31
- Political groups: Fianna Fáil (9) Fine Gael (5) Sinn Féin (4) Green (3) Labour (3) Independent Ireland (1) PBP–Solidarity (1) Social Democrats (1) Independent (4)

Elections
- Voting system: Single transferable vote
- Last election: 7 June 2024

Motto
- Latin: Statio Bene Fida Carinis "A safe harbour for ships"

Meeting place
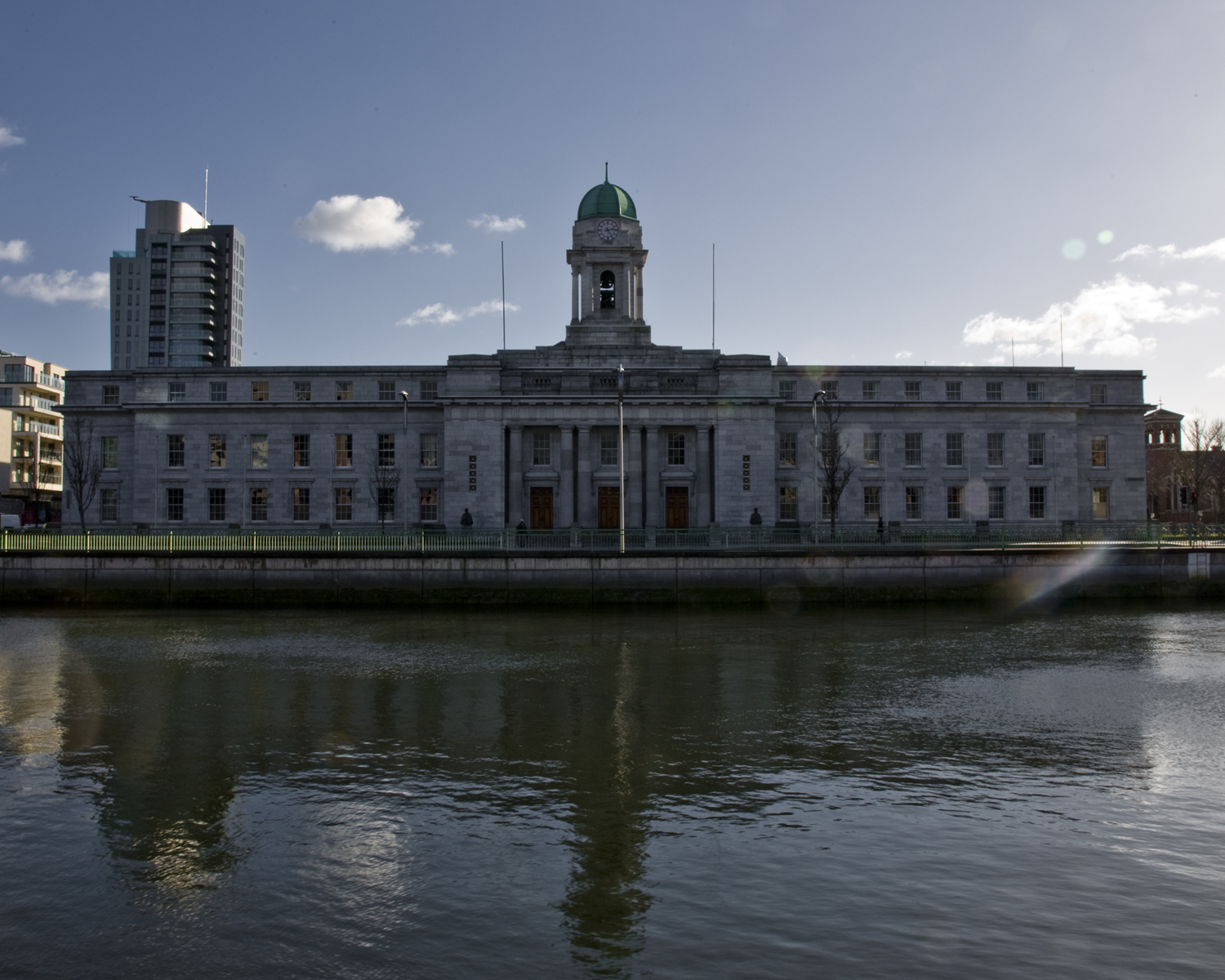
- City Hall, Cork

Website
- Official website

The area governed by the council prior to the 2019 boundary extension

Cork City Council (Irish: Comhairle Cathrach Chorcaí) is the local authority of the city of Cork in Ireland. As a city council, it is governed by the Local Government Act 2001. Before 1 January 2002, the council was known as Cork Corporation. The council is responsible for housing and community, roads and transportation, urban planning and development, amenity and culture, environment and the management of some emergency services (including Cork City Fire Brigade). The council has 31 elected members. Elections are held every five years and are by single transferable vote. The head of the council is elected on an annual basis and has the honorific title of Lord Mayor. The city administration is headed by a chief executive, Valerie O'Sullivan. The council meets at City Hall, Cork.

== Boundary changes ==
The area under the administration of Cork City Council was expanded in 1840, in 1955 and in 1965.

The area was extended from 31 May 2019, taking in territory under the administration of Cork County Council. This implemented changes under the Local Government Act 2019.

The 2015 Cork Local Government Review recommended merging Cork City Council and Cork County Council into a single "super council", within which a metropolitan district council will govern the Metropolitan Cork area; however, a minority report opposed the merger. This was subsequently followed in 2017 by a report published by an expert advisory group recommending a city boundary extension. The city boundary was to be extended to include Little Island, Cork Airport, Ballincollig, Blarney, and Carrigtwohill, adding a population of over 100,000, however the final extension will not include either Little Island or Carrigtwohill. Places farther out will remain part of the county, including Cobh, Carrigaline, and Midleton, as well as Ringaskiddy, the centre of the Port of Cork. The report gives parameters for compensation to be paid by the city to the county for the consequent reduction in its revenue. The revised proposal was welcomed by Micheál Martin but criticised by some county councillors. The city council voted unanimously to accept it. Barry Roche of The Irish Times wrote that the Mackinnon Report "has proven almost as divisive as its predecessor", except with the city and county councils' positions reversed. On 6 June 2018 Cabinet approval was given for the boundary extension, to include the surrounding areas of Cork Airport, Douglas and others.

== Regional Assembly ==
Cork City Council has two representatives on the Southern Regional Assembly who are part of the South-West Strategic Planning Area Committee.

== Elections ==
Members of Cork City Council are elected for a five-year term of office on the electoral system of proportional representation by means of the single transferable vote (PR-STV) from multi-member local electoral areas (LEAs).

Year	FF	FG	SF	GP	Lab	PBP–S	SD	II	WP	PDs	Ind.	Total
2024	9	5	4	3	3	1	1	1	0	—N/a	4	31
2019	8	7	4	4	1	1	0	—N/a	1	—N/a	5	31
2014	10	5	8	0	0	3	—N/a	—N/a	1	—N/a	4	31
2009	6	8	4	0	7	1	—N/a	—N/a	1	—N/a	4	31
2004	11	8	2	1	6	1	—N/a	—N/a	0	1	1	31
1999	12	8	1	1	5	0	—N/a	—N/a	0	2	2	31
1991	9	6	0	1	6	—N/a	—N/a	—N/a	3	3	3	31
1985	13	8	0	0	5	—N/a	—N/a	—N/a	2	—N/a	3	31

== Local electoral areas ==
Cork is divided into five LEAs, defined by electoral divisions and wards.

LEA	Definition	Seats
Cork City North-East	The electoral divisions of Blackpool A, Blackpool B, Mayfield, Montenotte A, Montenotte B, St. Patrick's A, St. Patrick's B, St. Patrick's C, The Glen A, The Glen B, Tivoli A and Tivoli B as described in the County Borough of Cork (Wards) Regulations 1970 and therein referred to as a ward; in the electoral division of St. Mary's (part); the townlands of Ballincolly, Ballincrokig and Kilbarry; and that part of the townland of Ballyvolane that is contained within the electoral division of St. Mary's (part); and those parts of the electoral divisions of Caherlag, Rathcooney (Part) and Riverstown that are contained within the City of Cork.	6
Cork City North-West	The electoral divisions of Churchfield, Commons, Fair Hill A, Fair Hill B, Fair Hill C, Farranferris A, Farranferris B, Farranferris C, Gurranebraher A, Gurranebraher B, Gurranebraher C, Gurranebraher D, Gurranebraher E, Knocknaheeny, Shanakiel, Shandon A, Shandon B, Sundays Well A and Sundays Well B as described in the County Borough of Cork (Wards) Regulations 1970 and therein referred to as a ward; in the electoral division of St. Mary's (part); the townlands of Ballycannon, Ballygrohan, Ballysheedy, Clogheen, Coolymurraghue, Killard, Killeens, Knocknacullen East, Knocknagorty, Mount Desert; and those parts of the townlands of Commons, Garranabraher and Knocknacullen West that are contained within the electoral division of St. Mary's (part); and those parts of the electoral divisions of Blarney, Carrigrohanebeg, Matehy and Whitechurch that are contained within the City of Cork.	6
Cork City South-Central	The electoral divisions of Ballyphehane A, Ballyphehane B, Centre A, Centre B, City Hall A, Evergreen, Gillabbey A, Gillabbey B, Gillabbey C, Greenmount, Mardyke, Pouladuff A, Pouladuff B, South Gate A, South Gate B, The Lough, Togher B, Tramore A, Tramore B, Tramore C, Turners Cross A, Turners Cross B, Turners Cross C and Turners Cross D as described in the County Borough of Cork (Wards) Regulations 1970 and therein referred to as a ward; in the electoral division of Lehenagh; the townlands of Ballycurreen, Curraghconway, Grange and Inchisarsfield; and in the electoral division of Douglas; the townlands of Ballinvuskig, Rathmacullig East and Rathmacullig West.	6
Cork City South-East	The electoral divisions of Ballinlough A, Ballinlough B, Ballinlough C, Browningstown, City Hall B, Knockrea A, Knockrea B, Mahon A, Mahon B, and Mahon C as set out in the County Borough of Cork (Wards) Regulations 1970 and therein referred to as a ward; in the electoral division of Douglas; the townlands of Ardarrig, Ballinimlagh Ballybrack, Castletreasure, Douglas, Grange, Hop Island, Knocknamullagh, Maryborough, Moneygurney, Monfieldstown, Mounthovel, Oldcourt, Rochestown; and that part of the townland of Ballyorban that is contained within the City of Cork; and those parts of the electoral divisions of Carrigaline (in the former rural district of Cork) and Monkstown Rural that are contained within the City of Cork.	6
Cork City South-West	The electoral divisions of Bishopstown A, Bishopstown B, Bishopstown C, Bishopstown D, Bishopstown E, Glasheen A, Glasheen B, Glasheen C and Togher A as described in the County Borough of Cork (Wards) Regulations 1970 and therein referred to as a ward; those parts of the townlands of Ballinaspig More and Inchigaggin that are contained within the electoral division of Bishopstown (part); in the electoral division of Lehenagh; the townlands of Ballyduhig North, Gortagoulane, Lehenagh Beg and Lehenagh More; and those parts of the electoral divisions of Ballincollig, Ballygarvan, Inishkenny and Ovens that are contained within the City of Cork.	7

== Councillors ==
The following were elected at the 2024 Cork City Council election.

=== 2024 seats summary ===
Party	Seats
Fianna Fáil	9
Fine Gael	5
Sinn Féin	4
Green	3
Labour	3
Independent Ireland	1
PBP–Solidarity	1
Social Democrats	1
Independent	4

=== Councillors by electoral area ===
This list reflects the order in which councillors were elected on 7 June 2024.

Council members from 2024 election
Local electoral area	Name	Party
Cork City North East	Ken O'Flynn (Note: Replaced during term, see table below for details.)	Independent Ireland
Cork City North East	John Maher	Labour
Cork City North East	Margaret McDonnell	Fianna Fáil
Cork City North East	Joe Kavanagh	Fine Gael
Cork City North East	Ted Tynan (Note: Tynan is a member of the Workers' Party but was elected as an Independent candidate due to an ongoing dispute within the party. His replacement, Jerrica Struthers is also a Workers' Party member.)	Independent
Cork City North East	Oliver Moran	Green
Cork City North West	Tony Fitzgerald	Fianna Fáil
Cork City North West	Damian Boylan	Fine Gael
Cork City North West	John Sheehan	Fianna Fáil
Cork City North West	Kenneth Collins	Sinn Féin
Cork City North West	Michelle Gould	Sinn Féin
Cork City North West	Brian McCarthy	PBP–Solidarity
Cork City South Central	Shane O'Callaghan	Fine Gael
Cork City South Central	Seán Martin	Fianna Fáil
Cork City South Central	Pádraig Rice	Social Democrats
Cork City South Central	Dan Boyle	Green
Cork City South Central	Paudie Dineen	Independent
Cork City South Central	Fiona Kerins	Sinn Féin
Cork City South East	Terry Shannon	Fianna Fáil
Cork City South East	Kieran McCarthy	Independent
Cork City South East	Mary Rose Desmond	Fianna Fáil
Cork City South East	Des Cahill	Fine Gael
Cork City South East	Peter Horgan	Labour
Cork City South East	Honore Kamegni	Green
Cork City South West	Fergal Dennehy	Fianna Fáil
Cork City South West	Colm Kelleher	Fianna Fáil
Cork City South West	Garret Kelleher	Fine Gael
Cork City South West	Joe Lynch	Sinn Féin
Cork City South West	Laura Harmon	Labour
Cork City South West	Terry Coleman	Fianna Fáil
Cork City South West	Albert Deasy	Independent

==== Co-options ====
Party	Outgoing	LEA	Reason	Date	Co-optee
Independent Ireland	Ken O'Flynn	Cork City North East	Elected to 34th Dáil at the 2024 general election	17 December 2024	Noel O'Flynn
Social Democrats	Pádraig Rice	Cork City South Central	Elected to 34th Dáil at the 2024 general election	17 December 2024	Niamh O'Connor
Labour	Laura Harmon	Cork City South West	Elected to 27th Seanad at the 2025 Seanad election	10 March 2025	Ciara O'Connor
Fine Gael	Garret Kelleher	Cork City South West	Elected to 27th Seanad at the 2025 Seanad election	10 March 2025	Gary O'Brien
Independent	Ted Tynan	Cork City North East	Resignation due to heath reasons	13 May 2026	Jerrica Struthers
