= 1994 Cork North-Central by-election =

By-election to the 27th Dáil

- 10 November 1994
- Turnout: 37,348 (53.2%)
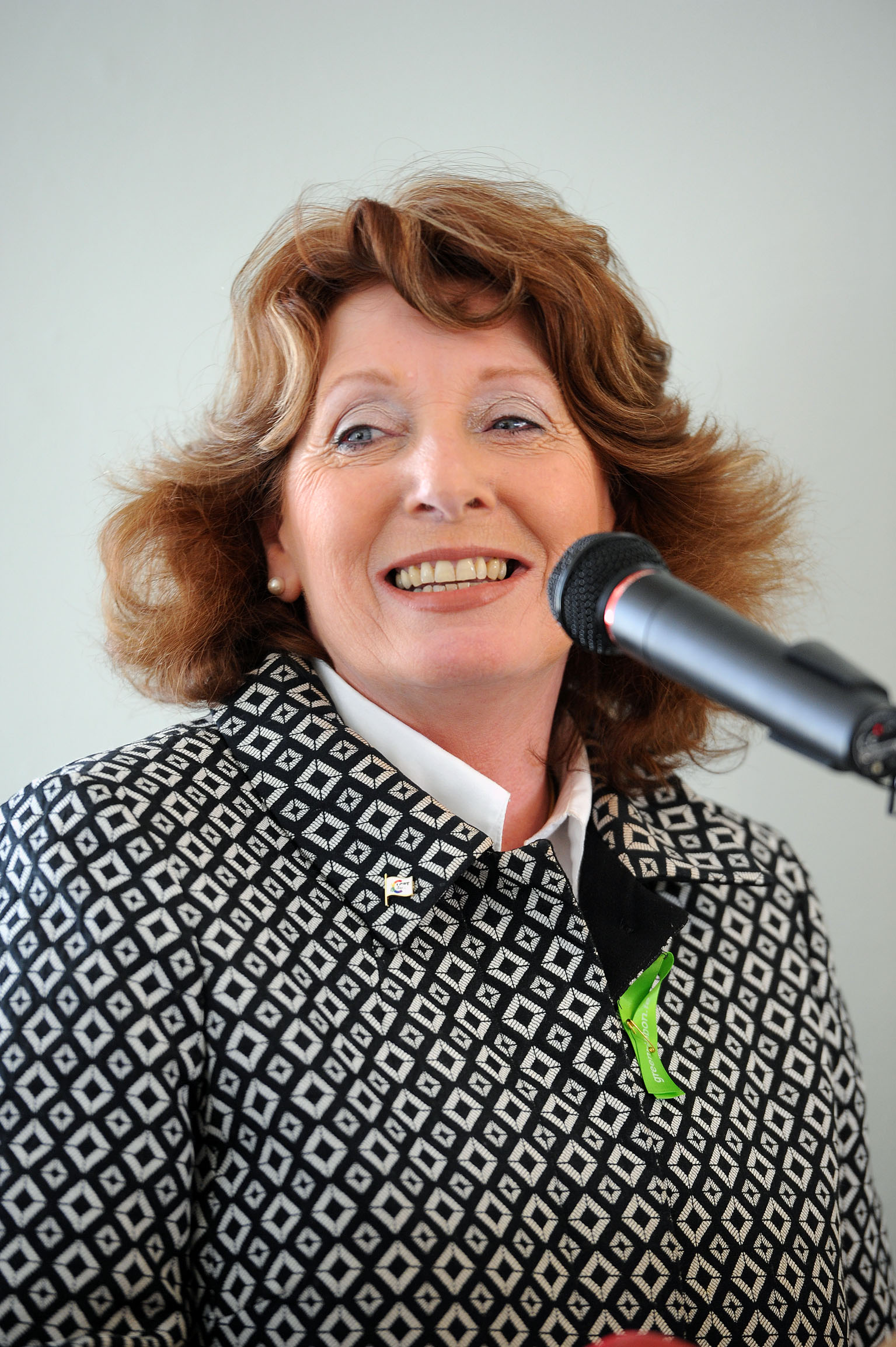

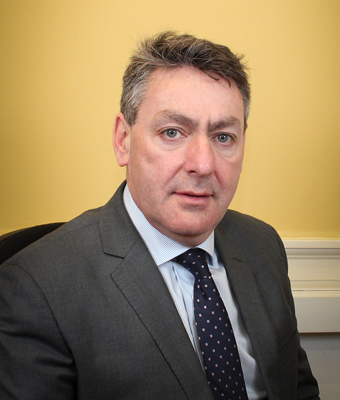

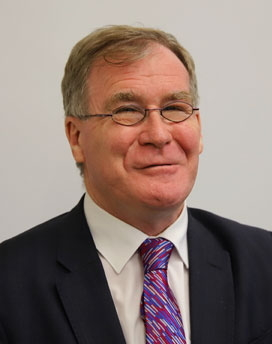
Nominee	Kathleen Lynch	Billy Kelleher	Colm Burke
Party	Democratic Left	Fianna Fáil	Fine Gael
First preferences	9,843	9,528	6,035
Percentage	26.4%	25.5%	16.2%
Final count	17,329	13,730	–
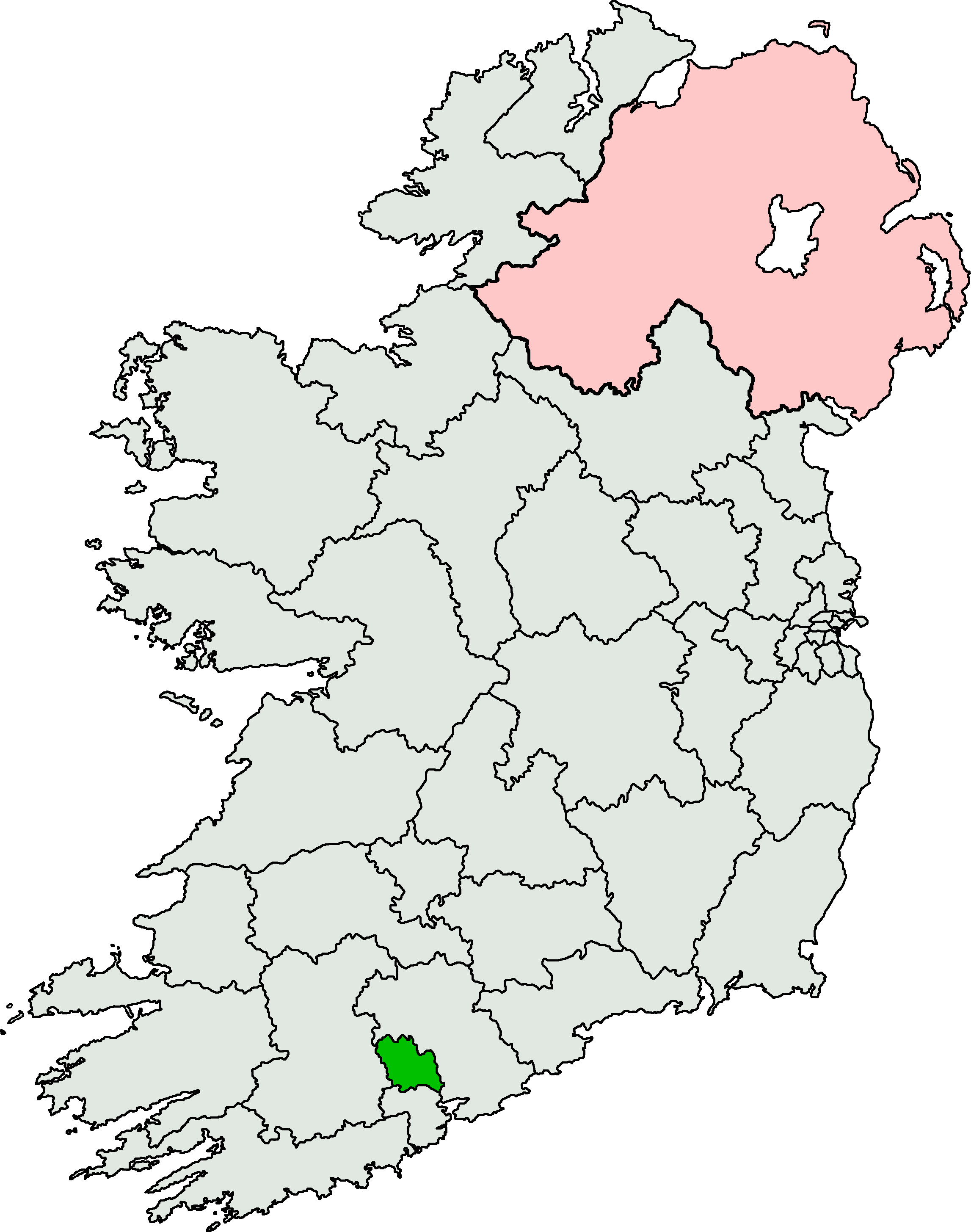
- Cork North-Central shown within Ireland
TD before election
Gerry O'Sullivan
Labour
TD after election
Kathleen Lynch
Democratic Left

A Dáil by-election was held in the constituency of Cork North-Central in Ireland on Thursday, 10 November 1994, to fill a vacancy in the 27th Dáil. It followed the death of Labour Party Teachta Dála (TD) Gerry O'Sullivan on 5 August 1994.

The writ of election to fill the vacancy was agreed by the Dáil on 18 October 1994.

The by-election was won by the Democratic Left candidate Kathleen Lynch, a member of Cork City Council. It was the second and final time Democratic Left would ever win a by-election.

Among the candidates were Senator Billy Kelleher, who would later serve as a TD, Colm Burke who would also go on to serve TD, Cork County Councillor Michael Burns, and Cork City Councillors Jimmy Homan and Con O'Leary.

On the same day, a by-election took place in Cork South-Central.

== Result ==
1994 Cork North-Central by-election
Party	Candidate	FPv%	Count							
Party	Candidate	FPv%	1	2	3	4	5	6	7	8
Democratic Left	Kathleen Lynch	26.4	9,843	10,000	10,359	10,734	11,106	12,260	14,175	17,329
Fianna Fáil	Billy Kelleher	25.5	9,528	9,674	9,729	9,825	10,037	10,635	11,951	13,730
Fine Gael	Colm Burke	16.2	6,035	6,139	6,193	6,273	6,315	7,348	8,128	
Labour	Lisa O'Sullivan	10.7	4,003	4,097	4,308	4,580	4,873	5,431		
Green	Jane Power	5.0	1,856	2,013	2,092	2,264	2,593			
Progressive Democrats	Michael Burns	4.4	1,628	1,669	1,690	1,727	1,753			
Sinn Féin	Don O'Leary	3.5	1,304	1,345	1,466	1,572				
Workers' Party	Jimmy Homan	2.9	1,082	1,122						
Independent	Con O'Leary	2.8	1,036	1,186	1,309					
Independent	Donie O'Leary	1.2	445							
Independent	Gerry Duffy	1.1	426							
Natural Law	Nora Ann Luck	0.4	162							
Electorate: 70,142 Valid: 37,348 Quota: 18,675 Turnout: 53.2%
