= Cork North-Central =

Dáil constituency (1981–present)

- Dáil constituency
- Location of Cork North-Central within Ireland
- Interactive map of constituency boundaries since the 2024 general election
- Major settlements: Ballincollig; Blarney; Cork City (northside); Glanmire; Mallow

Current constituency
- Created: 1981
- Seats: 5 (1981–2007); 4 (2007–2024); 5 (2024–)
- TDs: Colm Burke (FG); Thomas Gould (SF); Eoghan Kenny (Lab); Ken O'Flynn (II); Pádraig O'Sullivan (FF)
- Local government areas: County Cork; Cork City
- Created from: Cork City; Cork Mid
- EP constituency: South

Cork North-Central is a parliamentary constituency represented in Dáil Éireann, the lower house of the Irish parliament or Oireachtas. The constituency elects five deputies (Teachtaí Dála, commonly known as TDs) on the system of proportional representation by means of the single transferable vote (PR-STV).

== History and boundaries ==
The constituency was created under the Electoral (Amendment) Act 1980 and first used at the 1981 general election, taking in parts of the former Cork City and Cork Mid constituencies. It is a mixed urban-rural constituency made up of the Cork North Central, Cork North East and Cork North West local electoral areas of Cork City north of the River Lee, and much of the Blarney local electoral area of County Cork.

The Constituency Review Report 2023 of the Electoral Commission recommended that at the next general election, Cork North-Central be increased to a five-seat constituency with the transfer of territory from Cork East and Cork North-West and the transfer of territory to Cork South-Central and Cork North-West.

For the 2024 general election, the Electoral (Amendment) Act 2023 defines the constituency as:

"In the city of Cork, the electoral divisions of:

Blackpool A, Blackpool B, Churchfield, Commons, Fair Hill A, Fair Hill B, Fair Hill C, Farranferris A, Farranferris B, Farranferris C, Gurranebraher A, Gurranebraher B, Gurranebraher C, Gurranebraher D, Gurranebraher E, Knocknaheeny, Mayfield, Montenotte A, Montenotte B, St. Mary's, St. Patrick's A, St. Patrick's B, St. Patrick's C, Shanakiel, Shandon A, Shandon B, Sunday's Well A, Sunday's Well B, The Glen A, The Glen B, Tivoli A, Tivoli B;
and those parts that are contained within the city of Cork of the electoral divisions of:
Ballincollig, Blarney, Caherlag, Carrigrohanebeg, Matehy, Rathcooney, Riverstown, Whitechurch;

and, in the county of Cork, the electoral divisions of:

Ballynaglogh, Blackpool, Carrignavar, Firmount, Glenville, Greenfort, Killeagh, Knockantota, in the former Rural District of Cork;
and those parts that are contained within the county of Cork of the electoral divisions of:
Ballincollig, Blarney, Caherlag, Carrigrohanebeg, Matehy, Rathcooney, Riverstown, Whitechurch, in the former Rural District of Cork;
Carrig, Kildinan, Watergrasshill, in the former Rural District of Fermoy;
Ballynamona, Mallow Rural, Rahan in the former Rural District of Mallow;
and Mallow North Urban, Mallow South Urban."

Changes to the Cork North-Central constituency
Years	TDs	Boundaries	Notes
1981–1992	5	In the county borough of Cork, the wards of Ballinlough A, Blackpool A, Blackpool B, Centre A, Centre B, Churchfield, City Hall A, City Hall B, Commons, Fair Hill A, Fair Hill B, Fair Hill C, Farranferris A, Farranferris B, Farranferris C, Gillabbey A, Gillabbey B, Gillabbey C, Gurranebraher A, Gurranebraher B, Gurranebraher C, Gurranebraher D, Gurranebraher E, Knocknaheeny, Mardyke, Mayfield, Montenotte A, Montenotte B, St. Patrick's A, St. Patrick's B, St. Patrick's C, Shanakiel, Shandon A, Shandon B, South Gate A, South Gate B, Sunday's Well A, Sunday's Well B, The Glen A, The Glen B, Tivoli A, Tivoli B and, in the county of Cork, the district electoral divisions of Ballynaglogh, Blackpool, Blarney, Caherlag, Carrignavar, Carrigrohane Beg, Dripsey, Firmount, Glenville, Greenfort, Killeagh, Knockantota, Knockraha, Matehy, Rathcooney, Riverstown, St. Mary's, Whitechurch, in the former Rural District of Cork.	
1992–2002	5	In the county borough of Cork, the wards of Ballinlough A, Bishopstown A, Bishopstown B, Bishopstown C, Blackpool A, Blackpool B, Centre A, Centre B, Churchfield, City Hall A, City Hall B, Commons, Fair Hill A, Fair Hill B, Fair Hill C, Farranferris A, Farranferris B, Farranferris C, Gillabbey A, Gillabbey B, Gillabbey C, Gurranebraher A, Gurranebraher B, Gurranebraher C, Gurranebraher D, Gurranebraher E, Knocknaheeny, Mardyke, Mayfield, Montenotte A, Montenotte B, St. Patrick's A, St. Patrick's B, St. Patrick's C, Shanakiel, Shandon A, Shandon B, South Gate A, South Gate B, Sunday's Well A, Sunday's Well B, The Glen A, The Glen B, Tivoli A, Tivoli B; and, in the county of Cork, the district electoral divisions of Ballynaglogh, Blackpool, Blarney, Caherlag, Carrignavar, Carrigrohane Beg, Glenville, Greenfort, Killeagh, Knockantota, Knockraha, Rathcooney, Riverstown, St. Mary's, Whitechurch, in the former Rural District of Cork.	District electoral divisions of Dripsey, Firmount and Matehy transferred to Cork North-West.
2002–2007	5	In the city of Cork, the electoral divisions of Ballinlough A, Bishopstown A, Bishopstown B, Bishopstown C, Blackpool A, Blackpool B, Centre A, Centre B, Churchfield, City Hall A, City Hall B, Commons, Evergreen, Fair Hill A, Fair Hill B, Fair Hill C, Farranferris A, Farranferris B, Farranferris C, Gillabbey A, Gillabbey B, Gillabbey C, Glasheen A, Glasheen B, Gurranebraher A, Gurranebraher B, Gurranebraher C, Gurranebraher D, Gurranebraher E, Knocknaheeny, Mardyke, Mayfield, Montenotte A, Montenotte B, St. Patrick's A, St Patrick's B, St. Patrick's C, Shanakiel, Shandon A, Shandon B, South Gate A, South Gate B, Sunday's Well A, Sunday's Well B, The Glen A, The Glen B, Tivoli A, Tivoli B, Tramore A, Turners Cross A; and, in the county of Cork, the electoral divisions of Blackpool, Blarney, Caherlag, Carrignavar, Greenfort, Killeagh, Knockantota, Rathcooney, Riverstown, St. Mary's, Whitechurch, in the former Rural District of Cork.	Electoral divisions of Evergreen, Glasheen A, Glasheen B, Tramore A and Turners Cross A transferred from Cork South-Central; Electoral divisions of Glenville, Ballynaglogh and Knockraha transferred to Cork East; Electoral division of Carrigrohane Beg transferred to Cork North-West
2007–2011	4	In the city of Cork, the electoral divisions of Blackpool A, Blackpool B, Churchfield, Commons, Fair Hill A, Fair Hill B, Fair Hill C, Farranferris A, Farranferris B, Farranferris C, Gurranebraher A, Gurranebraher B, Gurranebraher C, Gurranebraher D, Gurranebraher E, Knocknaheeny, Mayfield, Montenotte A, Montenotte B, St. Patrick's A, St. Patrick's B, St. Patrick's C, Shanakiel, Shandon A, Shandon B, Sunday's Well A, Sunday's Well B, The Glen A, The Glen B, Tivoli A, Tivoli B; and, in the county of Cork, the electoral divisions of Blackpool, Blarney, Caherlag, Carrignavar, Carrigrohane Beg, Dripsey, Firmount, Greenfort, Killeagh, Knockantota, Matehy, Rathcooney, Riverstown, St. Mary's, Whitechurch, in the former Rural District of Cork; Gowlane, in the former Rural District of Macroom.	Electoral divisions of Ballinlough A, Bishopstown A, Bishopstown B, Bishopstown C, Centre A, Centre B, City Hall A, City Hall B, Evergreen, Gillabbey A, Gilabbey B, Gilabbey C, Glasheen A, Glasheen B, Mardyke, South Gate, South Gate B, Tramore A and Turner's Cross A transferred to Cork South-Central; Electoral divisions of Carrigrohane Beg, Dripsey, Firmount, Matehy, and Gowlane transferred from Cork North-West
2011–2016	4	In the city of Cork, the electoral divisions of Blackpool A, Blackpool B, Churchfield, Commons, Fair Hill A, Fair Hill B, Fair Hill C, Farranferris A, Farranferris B, Farranferris C, Gurranebraher A, Gurranebraher B, Gurranebraher C, Gurranebraher D, Gurranebraher E, Knocknaheeny, Mayfield, Montenotte A, Montenotte B, St. Patrick's A, St. Patrick's B, St. Patrick's C, Shanakiel, Shandon A, Shandon B, Sunday's Well A, Sunday's Well B, The Glen A, The Glen B, Tivoli A, Tivoli B; and, in the county of Cork, the electoral divisions of Ballynaglogh, Blackpool, Blarney, Caherlag, Carrignavar, Carrigrohane Beg, Dripsey, Firmount, Glenville, Greenfort, Killeagh, Knockantota, Matehy, Rathcooney, Riverstown, St. Mary's, Whitechurch, in the former Rural District of Cork; Carrig, Kildinan, Watergrasshill, in the former Rural District of Fermoy; Gowlane, Kilcullen, Mountrivers, in the former Rural District of Macroom; Ballynamona, Dromore, Kilshannig, Rahan, in the former Rural District of Mallow.	Electoral divisions of Ballynaglogh, Glenville, Carrig, Kildinan, Watergrasshill, Ballynamona and Rahan transferred from Cork East; Electoral divisions of Kilcullen, Mountrivers, Dromore and Kilshannig transferred from Cork North-West.
2016–	4	In the city of Cork, the electoral divisions of Bishopstown A, Bishopstown B, Bishopstown C, Blackpool A, Blackpool B, Centre A, Centre B, Churchfield, Commons, Fair Hill A, Fair Hill B, Fair Hill C, Farranferris A, Farranferris B, Farranferris C, Gillabbey A, Gillabbey B, Gillabbey C, Glasheen A, Glasheen B, Gurranebraher A, Gurranebraher B, Gurranebraher C, Gurranebraher D, Gurranebraher E, Knocknaheeny, Mardyke, Mayfield, Montenotte A, Montenotte B, St. Patrick’s A, St. Patrick’s B, St. Patrick’s C, Shanakiel, Shandon A, Shandon B, Sunday’s Well A, Sunday’s Well B, The Glen A, The Glen B, Tivoli A, Tivoli B; and, in the county of Cork, the electoral divisions of Ballynaglogh, Blackpool, Blarney, Caherlag, Carrignavar, Carrigrohane Beg, Dripsey, Firmount, Glenville, Greenfort, Killeagh, Knockantota, Matehy, Rathcooney, Riverstown, St. Mary’s, Whitechurch, and the townland of Inchigaggin in the electoral division of Bishopstown (part), in the former Rural District of Cork; Carrig, Kildinan, Watergrasshill, in the former Rural District of Fermoy; Gowlane, in the former Rural District of Macroom; Ballynamona, Rahan, in the former Rural District of Mallow.	Electoral divisions of Bishopstown A, Bishopstown B, Bishopstown C, Centre A, Centre B, Gillabbey A, Gillabbey B, Gillabbey C, Glasheen A, Glasheen B, Mardyke and the Townland of Inchigaggin transferred from Cork South-Central; Electoral divisions of Kilcullen, Mountrivers, Dromore and Kilshannig transferred to Cork North-West.

== TDs ==
Teachtaí Dála (TDs) for Cork North-Central 1981–
Key to parties: AAA–PBP = AAA–PBP; DL = Democratic Left; FF = Fianna Fáil; FG = Fine Gael; II = Independent Ireland; Lab = Labour; PDs = Progressive Democrats; SF = Sinn Féin; S–PBP = Solidarity–PBP
Dáil	Election	Deputy (Party)	Deputy (Party)	Deputy (Party)	Deputy (Party)	Deputy (Party)
22nd	1981	Toddy O'Sullivan (Lab)	Liam Burke (FG)	Denis Lyons (FF)	Bernard Allen (FG)	Seán French (FF)
23rd	1982 (Feb)	Toddy O'Sullivan (Lab)	Liam Burke (FG)	Denis Lyons (FF)	Bernard Allen (FG)	Seán French (FF)
24th	1982 (Nov)	Toddy O'Sullivan (Lab)	Liam Burke (FG)	Denis Lyons (FF)	Bernard Allen (FG)	Dan Wallace (FF)
25th	1987	Máirín Quill (PDs)	Liam Burke (FG)	Denis Lyons (FF)	Bernard Allen (FG)	Dan Wallace (FF)
26th	1989	Máirín Quill (PDs)	Gerry O'Sullivan (Lab)	Denis Lyons (FF)	Bernard Allen (FG)	Dan Wallace (FF)
27th	1992	Máirín Quill (PDs)	Gerry O'Sullivan (Lab)	Liam Burke (FG)	Bernard Allen (FG)	Dan Wallace (FF)
27th	1994 by-election	Máirín Quill (PDs)	Kathleen Lynch (DL)	Liam Burke (FG)	Bernard Allen (FG)	Dan Wallace (FF)
28th	1997	Billy Kelleher (FF)	Noel O'Flynn (FF)	Liam Burke (FG)	Bernard Allen (FG)	Dan Wallace (FF)
29th	2002	Billy Kelleher (FF)	Noel O'Flynn (FF)	Kathleen Lynch (Lab)	Bernard Allen (FG)	Dan Wallace (FF)
30th	2007	Billy Kelleher (FF)	Noel O'Flynn (FF)	Kathleen Lynch (Lab)	Bernard Allen (FG)	4 seats from 2007
31st	2011	Billy Kelleher (FF)	Jonathan O'Brien (SF)	Kathleen Lynch (Lab)	Dara Murphy (FG)	4 seats from 2007
32nd	2016	Billy Kelleher (FF)	Jonathan O'Brien (SF)	Mick Barry (AAA–PBP)	Dara Murphy (FG)	4 seats from 2007
32nd	2019 by-election	Pádraig O'Sullivan (FF)	Jonathan O'Brien (SF)	Mick Barry (AAA–PBP)	Dara Murphy (FG)	4 seats from 2007
33rd	2020	Pádraig O'Sullivan (FF)	Thomas Gould (SF)	Mick Barry (S–PBP)	Colm Burke (FG)	4 seats from 2007
34th	2024	Pádraig O'Sullivan (FF)	Thomas Gould (SF)	Eoghan Kenny (Lab)	Colm Burke (FG)	Ken O'Flynn (II)

Note: The columns in this table are used only for presentational purposes, and no significance should be attached to the order of columns. For details of the order in which seats were won at each election, see the detailed results of that election.

== Elections ==
*: Outgoing TD

=== 2024 general election ===
2024 general election: Cork North-Central
Party	Candidate	FPv%	Count																
Party	Candidate	FPv%	1	2	3	4	5	6	7	8	9	10	11	12	13	14	15	16	17
Fianna Fáil	Pádraig O'Sullivan	13.1	7,708	7,727	7,741	7,856	7,999	8,169	9,089	9,150	9,528	9,588	9,605	10,193					
Sinn Féin	Thomas Gould	12.5	7,399	7,464	7,488	7,513	7,526	7,622	7,644	8,004	8,251	10,435							
Fine Gael	Colm Burke	9.7	5,736	5,747	5,758	5,859	6,420	6,502	6,617	6,680	6,913	6,957	6,971	8,681	9,064	11,223			
Independent Ireland	Ken O'Flynn	9.7	5,733	5,792	5,820	5,843	5,870	6,426	6,553	7,833	8,317	8,487	8,584	8,697	9,000	10,031			
Fianna Fáil	Tony Fitzgerald	6.9	4,084	4,094	4,116	4,145	4,200	4,284	4,718	4,813	4,938	5,000	5,012	5,431	5,705				
PBP–Solidarity	Mick Barry (Note: Barry was a member of Solidarity.)	5.9	3,494	3,630	3,706	3,814	3,826	3,932	3,952	4,184	4,462	4,724	4,958	5,105	6,443	6,997	7,251	7,309	7,426
Labour	Eoghan Kenny	5.6	3,329	3,356	3,388	3,466	3,497	3,549	3,590	3,674	4,624	4,727	4,785	4,952	6,248	6,683	7,250	7,393	7,461
Sinn Féin	Joe Lynch	4.9	2,894	2,931	3,010	3,040	3,045	3,135	3,219	3,328	3,393								
Fine Gael	Garret Kelleher	4.7	2,790	2,798	2,898	2,953	3,241	3,289	3,654	3,685	3,750	3,909	3,930						
Labour	John Maher	4.5	2,687	2,731	2,789	3,048	3,125	3,196	3,224	3,325									
Ireland First	Derek Blighe	4.2	2,475	2,539	2,545	2,549	2,556	2,893	2,915										
Social Democrats	Susan Doyle	3.8	2,255	2,315	2,976	3,308	3,371	3,447	3,522	3,585	3,934	4,098	4,234	4,487					
Fianna Fáil	Sandra Murphy Kelleher	3.6	2,100	2,124	2,166	2,208	2,299	2,335											
Aontú	Finian Toomey	3.2	1,864	1,916	1,935	1,961	1,969												
Fine Gael	Imelda Daly	2.2	1,311	1,324	1,331	1,403													
Green	Oliver Moran	2.1	1,264	1,280	1,326														
Social Democrats	Ciarán McCarthy	2.1	1,228	1,245															
Independent	Rachel Hurley Roche (Note: Hurley Roche was a member of the Ted Tynan wing of the Workers' Party, which split in 2021. She was listed as a member of the Workers' Party on the Electoral Commission website, but as non-party on the ballot paper.)	0.6	367																
Independent	Martin Condon	0.3	152																
Independent	Joseph Gerard Peters	0.2	107																
Independent	John Donohoe	0.2	94																
Electorate: 102,250 Valid: 59,071 Spoilt: 552 Quota: 9,846 Turnout: 58.3%

=== 2020 general election ===
2020 general election: Cork North-Central
Party	Candidate	FPv%	Count													
Party	Candidate	FPv%	1	2	3	4	5	6	7	8	9	10	11	12	13	14
Sinn Féin	Thomas Gould	26.7	13,811													
Fianna Fáil	Pádraig O'Sullivan	15.8	8,158	8,247	8,259	8,269	8,276	8,461	8,624	9,179	9,242	9,417	9,821	12,099		
Fine Gael	Colm Burke	12.8	6,646	6,717	6,731	6,738	6,748	6,775	7,486	7,617	7,687	7,783	8,201	8,670	9,117	10,649
Independent	Ken O'Flynn	7.7	3,994	4,422	4,438	4,478	4,546	4,672	4,700	4,754	4,830	5,401	5,928	6,394	6,771	7,280
Solidarity–PBP	Mick Barry (Note: Barry was a member of Solidarity.)	7.2	3,703	5,162	5,185	5,229	5,457	5,576	5,594	5,628	5,981	6,199	6,815	7,205	7,425	9,396
Fianna Fáil	Tony Fitzgerald	6.5	3,338	3,512	3,526	3,531	3,576	3,588	3,610	3,927	3,961	4,062	4,256			
Green	Oliver Moran	6.2	3,205	3,381	3,403	3,410	3,452	3,529	3,617	3,688	4,181	4,304	5,206	5,416	5,738	
Labour	John Maher	5.0	2,561	2,855	2,864	2,869	2,939	3,056	3,128	3,183	3,428	3,513				
Aontú	Finian Toomey	2.6	1,325	1,430	1,449	1,507	1,540	1,571	1,584	1,602	1,647					
Fianna Fáil	Sandra Murphy	2.4	1,218	1,256	1,264	1,267	1,278	1,283	1,329							
Fine Gael	Lorraine O'Neill	2.2	1,156	1,173	1,178	1,181	1,185	1,221								
Social Democrats	Sinéad Halpin	2.2	1,121	1,295	1,309	1,325	1,396	1,444	1,465	1,503						
Independent	Ger Keohane	1.3	694	759	766	783	866									
Independent	T J Hogan	0.5	257	407	427	454										
Independent	Diarmaid Ó Cadhla	0.4	230	270	288											
Workers' Party	James Coughlan	0.4	180	301	311	327										
Independent	Sean O'Leary	0.3	137	152												
Independent	Stephen O'Donovan	0.1	44	83												
Electorate: 87,473 Valid: 51,778 Spoilt: 440 Quota: 10,356 Turnout: 52,218 (59.7%)

=== 2019 by-election ===
In May 2019, Billy Kelleher was elected to the European Parliament for the South constituency, vacating his seat in the Dáil on 1 July. A by-election to fill the vacancy was held in the constituency on 29 November 2019.

2019 by-election: Cork North-Central
Party	Candidate	FPv%	Count									
Party	Candidate	FPv%	1	2	3	4	5	6	7	8	9	10
Fianna Fáil	Pádraig O'Sullivan	28.0	7,148	7,154	7,177	7,202	7,250	7,451	7,544	7,878	8,657	11,633
Fine Gael	Colm Burke	21.1	5,385	5,386	5,398	5,431	5,469	5,593	5,684	6,118	6,972	
Sinn Féin	Thomas Gould	19.7	5,041	5,042	5,077	5,275	5,368	5,479	5,935	6,184	7,130	8,044
Labour	John Maher	9.7	2,482	2,485	2,501	2,565	2,705	2,750	2,947	3,866		
Green	Oliver Moran	7.4	1,883	1,884	1,898	1,932	2,095	2,195	2,537			
Solidarity–PBP	Fiona Ryan	4.4	1,121	1,125	1,155	1,260	1,436	1,534				
Aontú	Finian Toomey	3.9	1,008	1,015	1,042	1,070	1,098					
Social Democrats	Sinéad Halpin	2.5	644	644	652	727						
Independent	Martin Condon	1.1	291	294	347							
Workers' Party	James Coughlan	1.1	281	285	290							
Independent	Thomas Kiely	0.9	234	248								
Independent	Charlie Keddy	0.2	49									
Electorate: 85,524 Valid: 25,567 Spoilt: 287 (1.1%) Quota: 12,784 Turnout: 25,854 (30.2%)

=== 2016 general election ===
2016 general election: Cork North-Central
Party	Candidate	FPv%	Count										
Party	Candidate	FPv%	1	2	3	4	5	6	7	8	9	10	11
Fianna Fáil	Billy Kelleher	27.9	14,286										
AAA–PBP	Mick Barry	15.7	8,041	8,713	8,904	9,138	9,347	10,097	10,714				
Sinn Féin	Jonathan O'Brien	12.2	6,231	6,641	6,754	6,865	6,939	7,260	7,462	11,079			
Fine Gael	Dara Murphy	10.3	5,264	5,718	5,746	5,800	5,957	6,008	6,166	6,250	6,369	6,403	9,256
Fine Gael	Julie O'Leary	7.5	3,841	4,283	4,364	4,443	4,687	4,771	5,138	5,225	5,488	5,581	
Sinn Féin	Thomas Gould	7.4	3,773	4,047	4,100	4,175	4,236	4,398	4,458				
Labour	Kathleen Lynch	7.3	3,723	4,358	4,419	4,506	4,608	4,718	5,286	5,436	5,805	5,973	7,491
Green	Oliver Moran	3.3	1,693	1,936	2,011	2,108	2,331	2,490					
Workers' Party	Ted Tynan	2.8	1,419	1,615	1,694	1,805	1,919						
Renua	Paddy O'Leary	2.2	1,120	1,445	1,520	1,716							
Independent	Ger Keohane	1.8	912	1,152	1,300								
Independent	Thomas Kiely	0.9	473	548									
Independent	Mick Murphy	0.4	215	265									
Identity Ireland	Peter O'Loughlin	0.4	183	218									
Electorate: 81,609 Valid: 51,174 Spoilt: 516 (1.0%) Quota: 10,235 Turnout: 51,690 (63.3%)

=== 2011 general election ===
2011 general election: Cork North-Central
Party	Candidate	FPv%	Count										
Party	Candidate	FPv%	1	2	3	4	5	6	7	8	9	10	11
Sinn Féin	Jonathan O'Brien	15.2	7,923	7,942	7,978	8,022	8,053	8,254	8,567	11,131			
Fianna Fáil	Billy Kelleher	15.1	7,896	7,933	7,941	7,981	8,023	8,057	8,384	8,542	8,574	9,183	9,595
Labour	Kathleen Lynch	14.7	7,676	7,696	7,734	7,749	7,847	7,953	8,236	9,504	9,905	14,088	
Fine Gael	Pat Burton	13.6	7,072	7,104	7,117	7,155	7,240	7,263	7,585	7,778	7,816	8,453	9,233
Fine Gael	Dara Murphy	12.7	6,597	6,615	6,642	6,682	6,768	6,809	7,038	7,271	7,356	8,367	9,515
Labour	John Gilroy	11.7	6,125	6,134	6,154	6,158	6,245	6,303	6,659	7,156	7,293		
Socialist Party	Mick Barry (Note: Barry campaigned as a member of the United Left Alliance.)	9.2	4,803	4,826	4,876	4,903	4,940	5,131	5,319				
New Vision	Pádraig O'Sullivan (Note: New Vision was an electoral alliance of independent non-party candidates and did not appear on the ballot.)	2.0	1,020	1,050	1,085	1,136							
Independent	Kevin Conway	1.8	958	969	996	1020							
Workers' Party	Ted Tynan	1.3	681	688	701	724							
Green	Ken Walsh	1.0	524										
Christian Solidarity	Harry Rea	0.6	324										
An Chomhdháil Phobail	John Adams	0.5	282										
Independent	Benjamin Ashu Arrah	0.3	161										
Independent	Fergus O'Rourke	0.2	95										
Electorate: 75,302 Valid: 52,137 Spoilt: 572 (1.1%) Quota: 10,428 Turnout: 52,709 (70.0%)

=== 2007 general election ===
2007 general election: Cork North-Central
Party	Candidate	FPv%	Count						
Party	Candidate	FPv%	1	2	3	4	5	6	7
Fianna Fáil	Billy Kelleher	22.3	9,456						
Fine Gael	Bernard Allen	16.2	6,866	6,935	7,066	7,267	7,515	8,193	9,258
Fianna Fáil	Noel O'Flynn	13.4	5,680	6,298	6,410	6,531	6,612	7,043	7,646
Labour	Kathleen Lynch	12.3	5,221	5,315	5,513	6,104	6,673	7,366	9,061
Fine Gael	Gerry Kelly	11.4	4,808	4,890	5,025	5,251	5,352	5,533	5,893
Sinn Féin	Jonathan O'Brien	8.2	3,456	3,487	3,621	3,776	4,333	5,074	
Independent	Dave McCarthy	5.9	2,492	2,533	2,662	2,776	3,064		
Socialist Party	Mick Barry	4.0	1,700	1,707	1,841	1,995			
Green	Chris O'Leary	3.5	1,503	1,528	1,690				
Independent	John McCarthy	1.7	702	713					
Workers' Party	Ted Tynan	0.6	263	267					
Independent	Stephen Saleh	0.3	116	119					
Fathers Rights	Niall Brennan	0.2	84	85					
Electorate: 67,777 Valid: 42,347 Spoilt: 471 (1.1%) Quota: 8,470 Turnout: 42,818 (63.1%)

=== 2002 general election ===
2002 general election: Cork North-Central
Party	Candidate	FPv%	Count						
Party	Candidate	FPv%	1	2	3	4	5	6	7
Fianna Fáil	Noel O'Flynn	16.4	7,387	7,441	7,495	7,525			
Fianna Fáil	Billy Kelleher	12.8	5,801	5,849	5,885	5,940	6,630	6,969	7,456
Fianna Fáil	Dan Wallace	12.3	5,537	5,608	5,632	5,675	6,235	6,577	7,187
Fine Gael	Bernard Allen	12.1	5,458	5,503	5,597	5,672	6,184	6,601	7,650
Labour	Kathleen Lynch	11.8	5,313	5,402	5,628	6,142	6,683	7,496	8,418
Fine Gael	Gerry Kelly	8.3	3,744	3,767	3,818	3,911	4,404	4,568	4,937
Independent	Joe O'Callaghan	6.9	3,154	3,222	3,319	3,457	3,705	4,465	
Progressive Democrats	John Minihan	6.9	3,126	3,152	3,173	3,286			
Sinn Féin	Jonathan O'Brien	6.3	2,860	2,965	3,223	3,405	3,483		
Green	Nicholas McMurray	2.5	1,155	1,196	1,329				
Socialist Party	Mick Barry	2.1	936	1,026					
Workers' Party	Ted Tynan	1.0	458						
Christian Solidarity	Gerry Duffy	0.5	215						
Electorate: 79,063 Valid: 45,144 Spoilt: 548 (1.2%) Quota: 7,525 Turnout: 45,692 (57.8%)

=== 1997 general election ===
1997 general election: Cork North-Central
Party	Candidate	FPv%	Count										
Party	Candidate	FPv%	1	2	3	4	5	6	7	8	9	10	11
Fine Gael	Bernard Allen	17.6	7,746										
Fine Gael	Liam Burke	12.6	5,527	5,761	5,816	5,903	5,987	6,153	6,362	6,548	7,544		
Fianna Fáil	Billy Kelleher	12.3	5,419	5,434	5,451	5,506	5,558	5,647	5,748	5,994	6,192	7,201	7,317
Fianna Fáil	Dan Wallace	12.0	5,273	5,293	5,342	5,462	5,528	5,792	5,937	6,235	6,394	7,583	
Fianna Fáil	Noel O'Flynn	11.2	4,943	4,961	4,994	5,040	5,122	5,258	5,308	5,536	5,660	6,368	6,475
Progressive Democrats	Máirín Quill	7.5	3,304	3,321	3,330	3,397	3,452	3,553	3,749	3,865	4,043		
Democratic Left	Kathleen Lynch	7.2	3,146	3,194	3,283	3,305	3,467	3,636	4,005	4,336	5,332	5,870	5,895
Labour	Sheila O'Sullivan	5.3	2,321	2,346	2,375	2,389	2,458	2,539	2,813	3,022			
Sinn Féin	Don O'Leary	3.8	1,654	1,659	1,737	1,754	1,883	2,023	2,185				
Green	Jane Power	3.0	1,340	1,345	1,378	1,435	1,574	1,759					
National Party	Con O'Leary	2.5	1,114	1,123	1,169	1,400	1,519						
Independent	Paddy Mulcahy	2.0	899	905	973	1,018							
Christian Solidarity	Eddie Mullins	1.8	777	779	792								
Workers' Party	Jimmy Homan	1.2	545	552									
Electorate: 71,873 Valid: 44,008 Spoilt: 408 (0.9%) Quota: 7,335 Turnout: 44,416 (61.8%)

=== 1994 by-election ===
Labour Party TD Gerry O'Sullivan died on 5 August 1994. A by-election was held to fill the vacancy on 10 November 1994.

1994 by-election: Cork North-Central
Party	Candidate	FPv%	Count							
Party	Candidate	FPv%	1	2	3	4	5	6	7	8
Democratic Left	Kathleen Lynch	26.4	9,843	10,000	10,359	10,734	11,106	12,260	14,175	17,329
Fianna Fáil	Billy Kelleher	25.5	9,528	9,674	9,729	9,825	10,037	10,635	11,951	13,730
Fine Gael	Colm Burke	16.2	6,035	6,139	6,193	6,273	6,315	7,348	8,128	
Labour	Lisa O'Sullivan	10.7	4,003	4,097	4,308	4,580	4,873	5,431		
Green	Jane Power	5.0	1,856	2,013	2,092	2,264	2,593			
Progressive Democrats	Michael Burns	4.4	1,628	1,669	1,690	1,727	1,753			
Sinn Féin	Don O'Leary	3.5	1,304	1,345	1,466	1,572				
Workers' Party	Jimmy Homan	2.9	1,082	1,122						
Independent	Con O'Leary	2.8	1,036	1,186	1,309					
Independent	Donie O'Leary	1.2	445							
Independent	Gerry Duffy	1.1	426							
Natural Law	Nora Ann Luck	0.4	162							
Electorate: 70,142 Valid: 37,348 Quota: 18,675 Turnout: 53.2%

=== 1992 general election ===
1992 general election: Cork North-Central
Party	Candidate	FPv%	Count															
Party	Candidate	FPv%	1	2	3	4	5	6	7	8	9	10	11	12	13	14	15	16
Labour	Gerry O'Sullivan	22.3	10,008															
Fianna Fáil	Dan Wallace	14.4	6,455	6,675	6,723	6,788	6,858	6,894	6,963	7,264	7,292	7,363	7,456	7,670				
Fine Gael	Bernard Allen	11.7	5,263	5,744	5,780	5,841	5,881	5,910	5,949	5,970	6,337	6,440	6,568	6,901	7,087	7,730		
Progressive Democrats	Máirín Quill	11.6	5,192	5,562	5,595	5,633	5,667	5,700	5,727	5,787	5,988	6,183	6,249	6,406	6,622	7,272	7,301	7,363
Fine Gael	Liam Burke	9.0	4,051	4,227	4,243	4,262	4,277	4,297	4,327	4,352	4,618	4,673	4,759	4,898	5,001	5,288	5,321	5,491
Fianna Fáil	Billy Kelleher	6.7	3,017	3,058	3,088	3,100	3,103	3,114	3,133	3,319	3,328	3,377	3,392	3,431	5,198	5,421	5,451	5,466
Fianna Fáil	Denis Lyons	5.5	2,460	2,500	2,524	2,539	2,546	2,559	2,596	2,751	2,764	2,788	2,804	2,840				
Democratic Left	John Kelleher	4.0	1,795	2,219	2,237	2,272	2,299	2,403	2,467	2,481	2,519	2,735	2,957	3,188	3,309			
Independent	Con O'Leary	2.3	1,036	1,200	1,226	1,266	1,535	1,572	1,684	1,692	1,708	1,830	2,024					
Fine Gael	Michael O'Leary	2.0	894	969	974	985	989	995	1,009	1,019								
Green	Donogh MacCarthy Morrogh	1.8	818	924	966	1,003	1,023	1,050	1,123	1,143	1,170							
Fianna Fáil	Gene McCarthy	1.7	755	775	805	814	817	821	833									
Workers' Party	Jimmy Homan	1.6	737	858	868	890	898	1,124	1,217	1,223	1,232	1,305						
Sinn Féin	Don O'Leary	1.4	618	656	664	678	695	727										
Independent	Donie O'Leary	1.1	481	534	554	585												
Christian Centrist	Gerry Duffy	1.0	447	456														
Workers' Party	Ted Tynan	1.0	446	590	594	614	629											
Independent	John O'Mahony	0.9	422	465	493													
Electorate: 68,479 Valid: 44,895 Spoilt: 841 (1.8%) Quota: 7,483 Turnout: 45,736 (66.8%)

=== 1989 general election ===
1989 general election: Cork North-Central
Party	Candidate	FPv%	Count								
Party	Candidate	FPv%	1	2	3	4	5	6	7	8	9
Labour	Gerry O'Sullivan	17.1	7,058								
Fine Gael	Bernard Allen	14.6	6,032	6,063	6,144	6,207	6,425	6,593	7,352		
Fianna Fáil	Dan Wallace	13.1	5,405	5,422	5,504	5,771	5,903	7,051			
Fine Gael	Liam Burke	11.5	4,757	4,769	4,801	4,847	4,932	5,056	5,404	5,647	5,657
Progressive Democrats	Máirín Quill	10.2	4,203	4,226	4,277	4,362	4,583	4,791	5,610	5,736	5,748
Fianna Fáil	Denis Lyons	9.7	4,008	4,012	4,063	4,378	4,405	5,895	6,213	6,249	6,403
Workers' Party	John Kelleher	8.2	3,395	3,454	3,722	3,775	4,153	4,270			
Fianna Fáil	Michael Bowes	7.0	2,865	2,868	2,912	3,364	3,398				
Fianna Fáil	Tim Brosnan	3.2	1,310	1,311	1,331						
Independent	Con O'Leary	2.9	1,180	1,205	1,424	1,435					
Sinn Féin	Kevin Wallace	1.9	766	772							
Communist	Noel Murphy	0.3	133	134							
Independent	Michael F. Murphy	0.2	68	69							
Independent	William Fitzsimon	0.2	67	67							
Electorate: 63,395 Valid: 41,247 Quota: 6,875 Turnout: 65.1%

=== 1987 general election ===
1987 general election: Cork North-Central
Party	Candidate	FPv%	Count											
Party	Candidate	FPv%	1	2	3	4	5	6	7	8	9	10	11	12
Fianna Fáil	Dan Wallace	17.3	7,509											
Fine Gael	Bernard Allen	13.7	5,934	5,950	5,965	6,035	6,066	6,155	6,273	6,324	6,531	6,663	6,782	7,292
Fine Gael	Liam Burke	12.6	5,438	5,446	5,451	5,486	5,504	5,562	5,604	5,638	5,777	5,847	5,946	6,212
Progressive Democrats	Máirín Quill	11.6	5,046	5,059	5,069	5,158	5,176	5,258	5,333	5,431	7,096	7,236		
Fianna Fáil	Denis Lyons	11.6	5,039	5,133	5,152	5,180	5,249	5,287	5,385	5,902	6,026	8,434		
Workers' Party	John Kelleher	6.1	2,628	2,634	2,725	2,809	2,967	3,139	3,255	3,306	3,354	3,453	3,663	
Labour	Gerry O'Sullivan	5.9	2,553	2,567	2,591	2,640	2,688	2,766	3,451	3,500	3,574	3,659	3,898	5,000
Fianna Fáil	Paud Black	5.6	2,435	2,493	2,502	2,529	2,573	2,612	2,641	3,132	3,158			
Progressive Democrats	Joseph McCarthy	5.1	2,199	2,202	2,207	2,235	2,252	2,297	2,331	2,356				
Labour	Joseph O'Callaghan	2.7	1,167	1,171	1,186	1,208	1,240	1,295						
Fianna Fáil	Ann Whyte	2.6	1,144	1,204	1,207	1,257	1,321	1,374	1,397					
Independent	Bernie Murphy	1.6	684	688	727	764	917							
Sinn Féin	Don O'Leary	1.6	681	683	715	732								
Independent	Denis Tobin	1.3	576	578	603									
Communist	Noel Murphy	0.4	182	182										
Independent	Con O'Connell	0.2	75	76										
Independent	Michael T. Murphy	0.1	53	53										
Electorate: 63,517 Valid: 43,343 Quota: 7,224 Turnout: 68.2%

=== November 1982 general election ===
November 1982 general election: Cork North-Central
Party	Candidate	FPv%	Count							
Party	Candidate	FPv%	1	2	3	4	5	6	7	8
Fianna Fáil	Dan Wallace	16.8	7,173							
Fine Gael	Bernard Allen	16.6	7,101	7,103	7,348					
Labour	Toddy O'Sullivan	13.2	5,623	5,627	5,671	5,684	6,290	6,378	7,552	
Fine Gael	Liam Burke	12.2	5,219	5,220	5,439	5,513	5,685	5,780	5,924	8,321
Fianna Fáil	Denis Lyons	11.7	4,999	5,016	5,034	5,035	5,174	6,450	6,654	6,794
Fianna Fáil	Seán French	9.7	4,129	4,139	4,171	4,175	4,337	4,673	4,869	4,986
Fine Gael	Colm Burke	5.5	2,368	2,369	2,499	2,625	2,741	2,793	2,924	
Fianna Fáil	Donal O'Connell	4.4	1,880	1,887	1,894	1,894	1,924			
Workers' Party	John Kelleher	4.3	1,836	1,837	1,844	1,846	2,169	2,206		
Independent	James Kenneally	4.0	1,725	1,727	1,732	1,732				
Fine Gael	William Nolan	1.7	714	714						
Electorate: 63,363 Valid: 42,767 Quota: 7,128 Turnout: 67.5%

=== February 1982 general election ===
February 1982 general election: Cork North-Central
Party	Candidate	FPv%	Count										
Party	Candidate	FPv%	1	2	3	4	5	6	7	8	9	10	11
Fianna Fáil	Denis Lyons	15.7	6,694	6,699	6,733	6,770	7,376						
Fine Gael	Bernard Allen	15.1	6,407	6,410	6,428	6,526	6,584	6,587	7,052	8,144			
Fine Gael	Liam Burke	14.6	6,234	6,237	6,255	6,300	6,336	6,338	6,476	7,502			
Labour	Toddy O'Sullivan	13.2	5,629	5,635	5,698	6,030	6,133	6,140	6,752	7,056	7,899		
Fianna Fáil	Seán French	11.7	4,975	4,981	5,005	5,053	5,628	5,759	5,969	6,027	6,067	6,169	6,263
Fianna Fáil	Dan Wallace	11.3	4,798	4,800	4,837	4,914	5,450	5,583	5,989	6,039	6,058	6,147	6,258
Fine Gael	Tomás Ryan	6.0	2,562	2,563	2,565	2,587	2,592	2,594	2,611				
Fianna Fáil	Liam Ó Murchú	4.4	1,894	1,897	1,935	1,986							
Independent	James Kenneally	4.2	1,785	1,805	1,968	2,249	2,283	2,284					
Sinn Féin The Workers' Party	Ted Tynan	2.3	962	983	1,093								
Irish Republican Socialist	Jim Lane	1.3	542	560									
Independent	James Corcoran	0.2	95										
Electorate: 61,463 Valid: 42,577 Spoilt: 421 (0.9%) Quota: 7,097 Turnout: 42,998 (69.9%)

=== 1981 general election ===
1981 general election: Cork North-Central
Party	Candidate	FPv%	Count									
Party	Candidate	FPv%	1	2	3	4	5	6	7	8	9	10
Labour	Toddy O'Sullivan	15.8	7,163	7,563	8,190							
Fine Gael	Liam Burke	14.3	6,497	6,598	6,731	6,834	7,783					
Fianna Fáil	Denis Lyons	11.9	5,394	5,436	5,472	5,494	5,520	5,521	5,996	6,015	6,430	7,436
Fianna Fáil	Seán French	10.8	4,913	4,981	5,046	5,071	5,106	5,116	5,148	5,153	5,593	6,604
Fine Gael	Bernard Allen	9.5	4,308	4,535	4,652	4,756	5,590	5,735	7,694			
Fianna Fáil	Máirín Quill	8.0	3,614	3,665	3,733	3,762	3,788	3,792	3,837	3,839	4,281	5,719
Fianna Fáil	Dan Wallace	7.3	3,327	3,439	3,526	3,557	3,580	3,582	3,611	3,614	4,050	
Anti H-Block	Mairéad Farrell	6.1	2,751	2,900	3,217	3,354	3,399	3,404	3,498	3,514		
Fine Gael	Tomás Ryan	5.8	2,614	2,622	2,643	2,665	2,799	2,830				
Fine Gael	John Blair	4.5	2,046	2,058	2,087	2,119						
Sinn Féin The Workers' Party	Ted Tynan	3.3	1,501	1,610								
Independent	James Kenneally	2.9	1,324									
Electorate: 61,463 Valid: 45,452 Quota: 7,576 Turnout: 74.0%

== See also ==
- Elections in the Republic of Ireland
- Politics of the Republic of Ireland
- List of Dáil by-elections
- List of political parties in the Republic of Ireland
