= Dan Wallace (politician) =

Irish politician (1942–2025)

Minister of State
- 1997–2002: Environment and Local Government
- 1992–1993: Environment

Teachta Dála
- In office November 1982 – May 2007
- Constituency: Cork North-Central

Personal details
- Born: 14 June 1942 Cork, Ireland
- Died: 17 February 2025 (aged 82) Cork, Ireland
- Party: Fianna Fáil
- Spouse: Ethel Sutton

Dan Wallace (14 June 1942 – 17 February 2025) was an Irish Fianna Fáil politician who served for almost twenty-five years as Teachta Dála (TD) for the Cork North-Central constituency.

== Life and career ==
He was a sacristan in Farranree Church and subsequent customs clerk with the Ford Motor Company in Cork, Wallace was an unsuccessful candidate at the 1981 and February 1982 general elections. He was first elected to the 24th Dáil at the November 1982 general election, having topped the poll, and was re-elected to Dáil Éireann in every subsequent general election until he retired at the 2007 general election.

In February 1992, he was appointed on the nomination of Taoiseach Albert Reynolds as Minister of State at the Department of the Environment, serving until January 1993. In July 1997, he was appointed on the nomination of Taoiseach Bertie Ahern as Minister of State at the Department of the Environment and Local Government, serving until June 2002.

In the 29th Dáil, Wallace was vice-chairperson of the Foreign Affairs committee until November 2004.

Wallace was Lord Mayor of Cork from 1985 to 1986. He died on 17 February 2025, at the age of 82.

Civic offices
| Preceded by Liam Burke | Lord Mayor of Cork; 1985–1986 | Succeeded by Gerry O'Sullivan |
Political offices
| Preceded by Ger Connolly; Mary Harney | Minister of State at the Department of the Environment; 1992–1993; With: Mary Harney | Succeeded by John Browne; Emmet Stagg |
| Preceded by Bernard Allen; Liz McManus | Minister of State at the Department of the Environment and Local Government; 1997–2002; With: Bobby Molloy | Succeeded by Noel Ahern; Pat "the Cope" Gallagher |

| Dáil | Election | Deputy (Party) | Deputy (Party) | Deputy (Party) | Deputy (Party) | Deputy (Party) |
|---|---|---|---|---|---|---|
| 22nd | 1981 | Toddy O'Sullivan (Lab) | Liam Burke (FG) | Denis Lyons (FF) | Bernard Allen (FG) | Seán French (FF) |
| 23rd | 1982 (Feb) | Toddy O'Sullivan (Lab) | Liam Burke (FG) | Denis Lyons (FF) | Bernard Allen (FG) | Seán French (FF) |
| 24th | 1982 (Nov) | Toddy O'Sullivan (Lab) | Liam Burke (FG) | Denis Lyons (FF) | Bernard Allen (FG) | Dan Wallace (FF) |
| 25th | 1987 | Máirín Quill (PDs) | Liam Burke (FG) | Denis Lyons (FF) | Bernard Allen (FG) | Dan Wallace (FF) |
| 26th | 1989 | Máirín Quill (PDs) | Gerry O'Sullivan (Lab) | Denis Lyons (FF) | Bernard Allen (FG) | Dan Wallace (FF) |
| 27th | 1992 | Máirín Quill (PDs) | Gerry O'Sullivan (Lab) | Liam Burke (FG) | Bernard Allen (FG) | Dan Wallace (FF) |
| 27th | 1994 by-election | Máirín Quill (PDs) | Kathleen Lynch (DL) | Liam Burke (FG) | Bernard Allen (FG) | Dan Wallace (FF) |
| 28th | 1997 | Billy Kelleher (FF) | Noel O'Flynn (FF) | Liam Burke (FG) | Bernard Allen (FG) | Dan Wallace (FF) |
| 29th | 2002 | Billy Kelleher (FF) | Noel O'Flynn (FF) | Kathleen Lynch (Lab) | Bernard Allen (FG) | Dan Wallace (FF) |
| 30th | 2007 | Billy Kelleher (FF) | Noel O'Flynn (FF) | Kathleen Lynch (Lab) | Bernard Allen (FG) | 4 seats from 2007 |
| 31st | 2011 | Billy Kelleher (FF) | Jonathan O'Brien (SF) | Kathleen Lynch (Lab) | Dara Murphy (FG) | 4 seats from 2007 |
| 32nd | 2016 | Billy Kelleher (FF) | Jonathan O'Brien (SF) | Mick Barry (AAA–PBP) | Dara Murphy (FG) | 4 seats from 2007 |
| 32nd | 2019 by-election | Pádraig O'Sullivan (FF) | Jonathan O'Brien (SF) | Mick Barry (AAA–PBP) | Dara Murphy (FG) | 4 seats from 2007 |
| 33rd | 2020 | Pádraig O'Sullivan (FF) | Thomas Gould (SF) | Mick Barry (S–PBP) | Colm Burke (FG) | 4 seats from 2007 |
| 34th | 2024 | Pádraig O'Sullivan (FF) | Thomas Gould (SF) | Eoghan Kenny (Lab) | Colm Burke (FG) | Ken O'Flynn (II) |
