= Con O'Leary =

Irish politician (1946–2024)

Cork City Councillor
- In office 27 June 1991 – 11 June 2004
- Constituency: Cork City North Central

Personal details
- Born: 1946 Cork, Ireland
- Died: 5 January 2024 (aged 77) Gran Canaria, Spain
- Party: Independent
- Other political affiliations: National Party
- Spouse: Ann Horgan
- Children: 4
- Profession: Shopkeeper

Cornelius O'Leary (1946 – 5 January 2024) was an Irish politician. He was an Independent member of Cork City Council and also contested several general elections as an Independent and as a National Party representative.

== Career ==
O'Leary was the Auditor of the UCC History Society (or UCC Historical Society, as it was then) in 1951 where he made several comments about the proportional representation voting system.

O'Leary and his wife bought the former Molloy's shop in Gurranabraher in 1973, renaming it Con's Shop. As proprietor of the local shop he earned the nickname Con the Robber. O'Leary was elected to Cork Corporation as an Independent on his first attempt at the 1991 local elections. He contested the 1992 general election in the Cork North-Central constituency but was not successful after receiving 1,036 first preference votes.

O'Leary again attempted to secure a seat in Dáil Éireann by contesting a 1994 by-election and the 1997 general election, the latter as a National Party candidate. He made national headlines in 1998 when he sued his own local authority for injuries he received when he fell on the steps of Cork City Hall after attending a corporation meeting. He eventually agreed an out-of-court settlement for an undisclosed sum, believed to have been £30,000.

O'Leary was re-elected to Cork City Council at the 2004 local elections. He retired from politics after completing his five-year term.

== Death ==
O'Leary died suddenly after falling ill on a family holiday in Gran Canaria, on 5 January 2024, at the age of 77.
