= Thomas Gould (politician) =

Irish politician (born 1968)

Thomas Gould TD
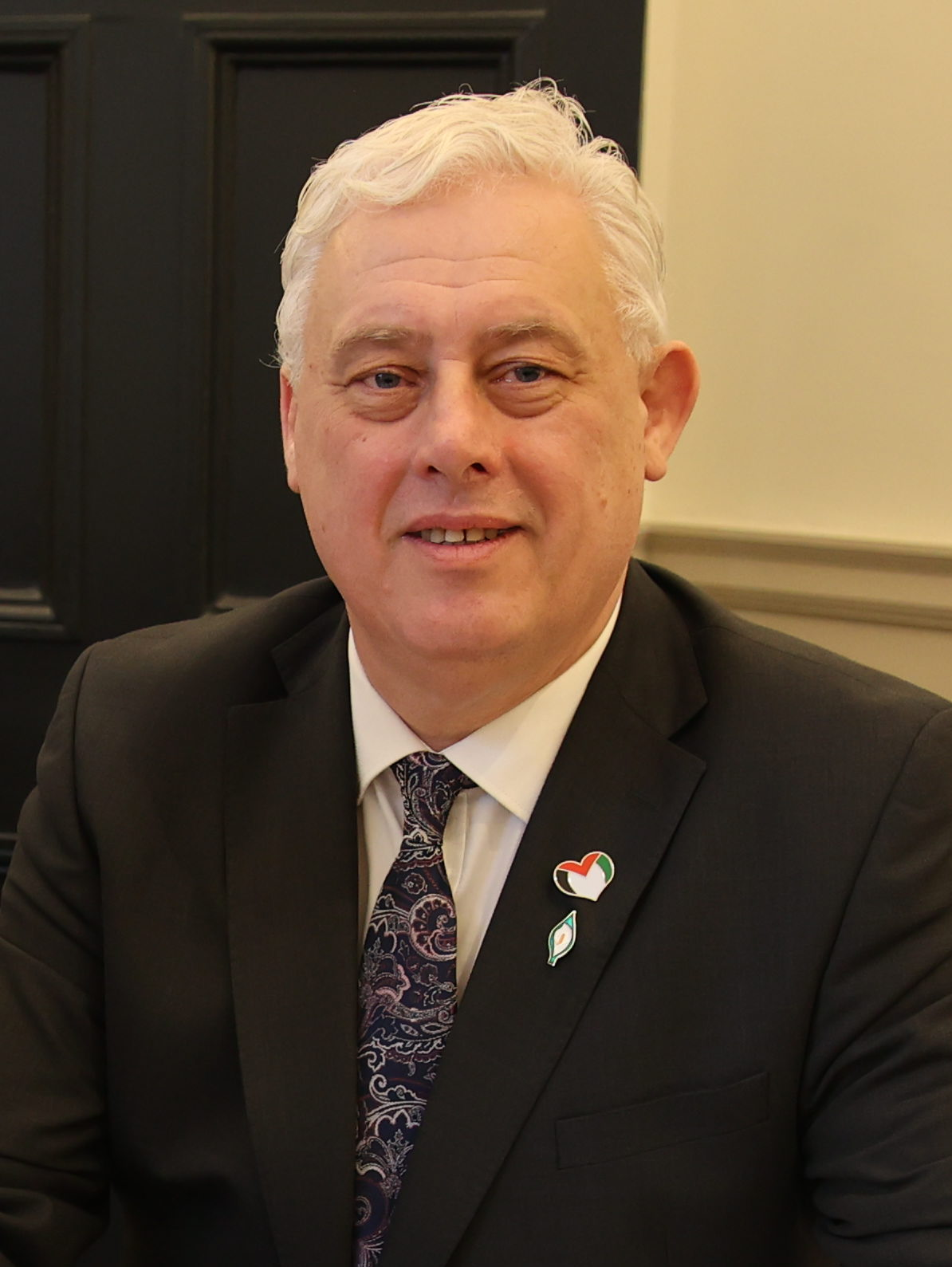
- Gould in 2024

Teachta Dála
- Incumbent
- Assumed office February 2020
- Constituency: Cork North-Central

Personal details
- Born: July 1968 (age 58) Cork, Ireland
- Party: Sinn Féin
- Children: 2

Thomas Gould (born July 1968) is an Irish Sinn Féin politician who has been a Teachta Dála (TD) for the Cork North-Central constituency since the 2020 general election.

== Political career ==
He was a member of Cork City Council, originally for the Cork City North Central area in 2009 and for the Cork City North West local electoral area from 2019. Gould was a candidate in the 2016 general election in Cork North-Central but was not elected. He was a candidate in the 2019 Cork North-Central by-election but was not elected. Gould was elected at the 2020 general election in Cork North Central. He received almost 27% of the first preference votes cast in the constituency. He was selected after Jonathan O'Brien had announced that he would not seek re-election.

In 2018, Gould claimed that the spending by Cork City Council for Prince Charles and Camilla was "overkill". In 2021, he defended former Sinn Féin politician Martin Ferris in saying that members of the Provisional IRA "were not criminals". Gould stated that the Provisional IRA was made up of volunteers "who stepped up in their community" at a time when they were "under attack".

At the 2024 general election, Gould was re-elected to the Dáil on the tenth count.

== Early and personal life ==
Gould is from the Cork suburb of Knocknaheeny and lives in Gurranabraher with his wife and two daughters. He was a logistics manager. He is involved with St. Vincent's GAA. In addition to this, he was serving on the board of directors of the Firkin Crane as of 2020.

In 2026, a speech of his in the Dáil Éireann went viral across Jamaican social media circles like that of Twitter as they observed and noted his Cork accent for its similarity to their patois.

Dáil	Election	Deputy (Party)	Deputy (Party)	Deputy (Party)	Deputy (Party)	Deputy (Party)
22nd	1981	Toddy O'Sullivan (Lab)	Liam Burke (FG)	Denis Lyons (FF)	Bernard Allen (FG)	Seán French (FF)
23rd	1982 (Feb)	Toddy O'Sullivan (Lab)	Liam Burke (FG)	Denis Lyons (FF)	Bernard Allen (FG)	Seán French (FF)
24th	1982 (Nov)	Toddy O'Sullivan (Lab)	Liam Burke (FG)	Denis Lyons (FF)	Bernard Allen (FG)	Dan Wallace (FF)
25th	1987	Máirín Quill (PDs)	Liam Burke (FG)	Denis Lyons (FF)	Bernard Allen (FG)	Dan Wallace (FF)
26th	1989	Máirín Quill (PDs)	Gerry O'Sullivan (Lab)	Denis Lyons (FF)	Bernard Allen (FG)	Dan Wallace (FF)
27th	1992	Máirín Quill (PDs)	Gerry O'Sullivan (Lab)	Liam Burke (FG)	Bernard Allen (FG)	Dan Wallace (FF)
27th	1994 by-election	Máirín Quill (PDs)	Kathleen Lynch (DL)	Liam Burke (FG)	Bernard Allen (FG)	Dan Wallace (FF)
28th	1997	Billy Kelleher (FF)	Noel O'Flynn (FF)	Liam Burke (FG)	Bernard Allen (FG)	Dan Wallace (FF)
29th	2002	Billy Kelleher (FF)	Noel O'Flynn (FF)	Kathleen Lynch (Lab)	Bernard Allen (FG)	Dan Wallace (FF)
30th	2007	Billy Kelleher (FF)	Noel O'Flynn (FF)	Kathleen Lynch (Lab)	Bernard Allen (FG)	4 seats from 2007
31st	2011	Billy Kelleher (FF)	Jonathan O'Brien (SF)	Kathleen Lynch (Lab)	Dara Murphy (FG)	4 seats from 2007
32nd	2016	Billy Kelleher (FF)	Jonathan O'Brien (SF)	Mick Barry (AAA–PBP)	Dara Murphy (FG)	4 seats from 2007
32nd	2019 by-election	Pádraig O'Sullivan (FF)	Jonathan O'Brien (SF)	Mick Barry (AAA–PBP)	Dara Murphy (FG)	4 seats from 2007
33rd	2020	Pádraig O'Sullivan (FF)	Thomas Gould (SF)	Mick Barry (S–PBP)	Colm Burke (FG)	4 seats from 2007
34th	2024	Pádraig O'Sullivan (FF)	Thomas Gould (SF)	Eoghan Kenny (Lab)	Colm Burke (FG)	Ken O'Flynn (II)
