= Gerry O'Sullivan =

Irish politician (1936–1994)

Minister of State
- 1993–1994: Marine

Teachta Dála
- In office June 1989 – 5 August 1994
- Constituency: Cork North-Central

Personal details
- Born: 10 April 1936 Cork, Ireland
- Died: 5 August 1994 (aged 58) Cork, Ireland
- Party: Labour Party

Gerry O'Sullivan (10 April 1936 – 5 August 1994) was an Irish Labour Party politician from Cork. He was a long-serving member of Cork City Council, and was Lord Mayor of Cork from 1986 to 1987.

O'Sullivan was elected to Dáil Éireann at the 1989 general election as a Labour Party Teachta Dála (TD) for Cork North-Central having topped the poll. He was re-elected at the 1992 general election, receiving 10,008 first preference votes, again topping the poll.

In January 1993, after the formation of a Fianna Fáil–Labour coalition government, he was appointed as Minister of State at the Department of the Marine (with special responsibility for Port Development Safety at sea and Inland Fisheries).

He died in office in August 1994 following a short illness.

The by-election for his seat was held on 10 November 1994, and was won by Kathleen Lynch of Democratic Left.

In 1996 the Port of Cork commissioned a new 30m, 176 ton tug and pilot vessel which was christened the M.T. Gerry O'Sullivan in his honour. The boat is usually moored in either Cobh or Ringaskiddy.

Civic offices
Preceded by Dan Wallace	Lord Mayor of Cork; 1986–1987	Succeeded by Thomas Brosnan
Political offices
Preceded by Pat "the Cope" Gallagher	Minister of State at the Department of the Marine; 1993–1994	Succeeded by Eamon Gilmore

Dáil	Election	Deputy (Party)	Deputy (Party)	Deputy (Party)	Deputy (Party)	Deputy (Party)
22nd	1981	Toddy O'Sullivan (Lab)	Liam Burke (FG)	Denis Lyons (FF)	Bernard Allen (FG)	Seán French (FF)
23rd	1982 (Feb)	Toddy O'Sullivan (Lab)	Liam Burke (FG)	Denis Lyons (FF)	Bernard Allen (FG)	Seán French (FF)
24th	1982 (Nov)	Toddy O'Sullivan (Lab)	Liam Burke (FG)	Denis Lyons (FF)	Bernard Allen (FG)	Dan Wallace (FF)
25th	1987	Máirín Quill (PDs)	Liam Burke (FG)	Denis Lyons (FF)	Bernard Allen (FG)	Dan Wallace (FF)
26th	1989	Máirín Quill (PDs)	Gerry O'Sullivan (Lab)	Denis Lyons (FF)	Bernard Allen (FG)	Dan Wallace (FF)
27th	1992	Máirín Quill (PDs)	Gerry O'Sullivan (Lab)	Liam Burke (FG)	Bernard Allen (FG)	Dan Wallace (FF)
27th	1994 by-election	Máirín Quill (PDs)	Kathleen Lynch (DL)	Liam Burke (FG)	Bernard Allen (FG)	Dan Wallace (FF)
28th	1997	Billy Kelleher (FF)	Noel O'Flynn (FF)	Liam Burke (FG)	Bernard Allen (FG)	Dan Wallace (FF)
29th	2002	Billy Kelleher (FF)	Noel O'Flynn (FF)	Kathleen Lynch (Lab)	Bernard Allen (FG)	Dan Wallace (FF)
30th	2007	Billy Kelleher (FF)	Noel O'Flynn (FF)	Kathleen Lynch (Lab)	Bernard Allen (FG)	4 seats from 2007
31st	2011	Billy Kelleher (FF)	Jonathan O'Brien (SF)	Kathleen Lynch (Lab)	Dara Murphy (FG)	4 seats from 2007
32nd	2016	Billy Kelleher (FF)	Jonathan O'Brien (SF)	Mick Barry (AAA–PBP)	Dara Murphy (FG)	4 seats from 2007
32nd	2019 by-election	Pádraig O'Sullivan (FF)	Jonathan O'Brien (SF)	Mick Barry (AAA–PBP)	Dara Murphy (FG)	4 seats from 2007
33rd	2020	Pádraig O'Sullivan (FF)	Thomas Gould (SF)	Mick Barry (S–PBP)	Colm Burke (FG)	4 seats from 2007
34th	2024	Pádraig O'Sullivan (FF)	Thomas Gould (SF)	Eoghan Kenny (Lab)	Colm Burke (FG)	Ken O'Flynn (II)
