= Eoghan Kenny =

Irish politician

Eoghan Kenny TD
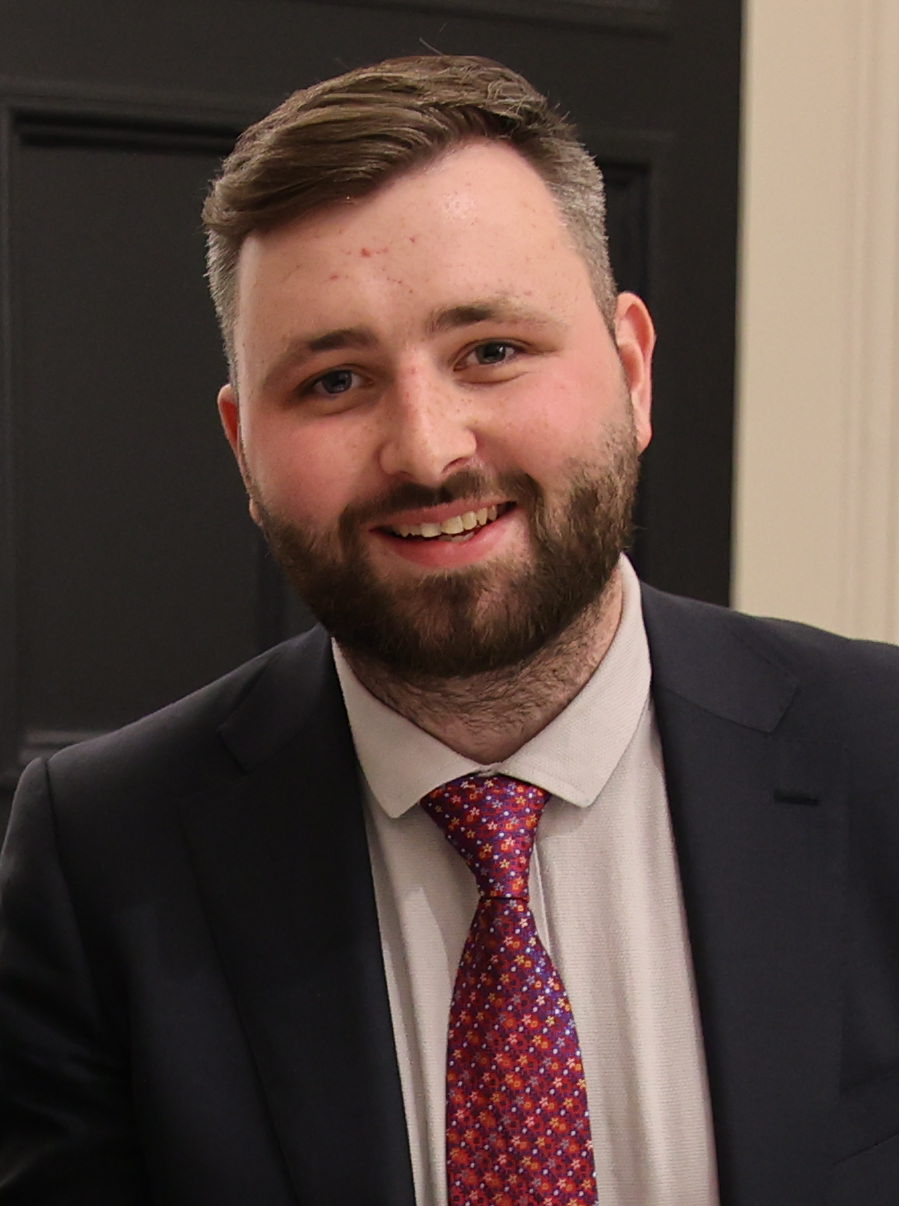
- Kenny in 2024

Teachta Dála
- Incumbent
- Assumed office November 2024
- Constituency: Cork North-Central

Personal details
- Born: February 2000 (age 26) Cork, Ireland
- Party: Labour Party
- Education: Mary Immaculate College

Eoghan Kenny (born February 2000) is an Irish Labour Party politician who has been a Teachta Dála (TD) for the Cork North-Central constituency since the 2024 general election.

== Early life ==
Kenny was born and raised in Mallow. He attended the local St Patrick's Boys National School (BNS) and the Patrician Academy. He went on to graduate from Mary Immaculate College in 2023 with a Bachelor of Education in Business Studies and Religious Education. He played minor hurling and football with Mallow GAA.

Prior to his election, Kenny was a business and religion teacher at Mayfield Community School in Cork.

== Political career ==
Kenny joined the Labour Party in 2017, and previously worked as secretary for Labour TD Seán Sherlock. Kenny was co-opted onto Cork County Council in 2024, replacing the retiring James Kennedy, and was re-elected to Cork County Council at the 2024 Cork County Council election. He was elected to the Dáil at the 2024 general election, becoming the youngest TD in the 34th Dáil and the first TD born in the 21st century.

During the 2024 general election while on RTÉ's Drivetime programme Kenny suffered an epileptic seizure, and was assisted by fellow election candidates. He has since spoken publicly about the event, the assistance he received, his medical treatment received and has supported Epilepsy Ireland in their activism to challenge stigma and lack of awareness regarding epilepsy diagnosis and seizure awareness.

Honorary titles
Preceded by James O'Connor	Baby of the Dáil; 2024–present	Incumbent

Dáil	Election	Deputy (Party)	Deputy (Party)	Deputy (Party)	Deputy (Party)	Deputy (Party)
22nd	1981	Toddy O'Sullivan (Lab)	Liam Burke (FG)	Denis Lyons (FF)	Bernard Allen (FG)	Seán French (FF)
23rd	1982 (Feb)	Toddy O'Sullivan (Lab)	Liam Burke (FG)	Denis Lyons (FF)	Bernard Allen (FG)	Seán French (FF)
24th	1982 (Nov)	Toddy O'Sullivan (Lab)	Liam Burke (FG)	Denis Lyons (FF)	Bernard Allen (FG)	Dan Wallace (FF)
25th	1987	Máirín Quill (PDs)	Liam Burke (FG)	Denis Lyons (FF)	Bernard Allen (FG)	Dan Wallace (FF)
26th	1989	Máirín Quill (PDs)	Gerry O'Sullivan (Lab)	Denis Lyons (FF)	Bernard Allen (FG)	Dan Wallace (FF)
27th	1992	Máirín Quill (PDs)	Gerry O'Sullivan (Lab)	Liam Burke (FG)	Bernard Allen (FG)	Dan Wallace (FF)
27th	1994 by-election	Máirín Quill (PDs)	Kathleen Lynch (DL)	Liam Burke (FG)	Bernard Allen (FG)	Dan Wallace (FF)
28th	1997	Billy Kelleher (FF)	Noel O'Flynn (FF)	Liam Burke (FG)	Bernard Allen (FG)	Dan Wallace (FF)
29th	2002	Billy Kelleher (FF)	Noel O'Flynn (FF)	Kathleen Lynch (Lab)	Bernard Allen (FG)	Dan Wallace (FF)
30th	2007	Billy Kelleher (FF)	Noel O'Flynn (FF)	Kathleen Lynch (Lab)	Bernard Allen (FG)	4 seats from 2007
31st	2011	Billy Kelleher (FF)	Jonathan O'Brien (SF)	Kathleen Lynch (Lab)	Dara Murphy (FG)	4 seats from 2007
32nd	2016	Billy Kelleher (FF)	Jonathan O'Brien (SF)	Mick Barry (AAA–PBP)	Dara Murphy (FG)	4 seats from 2007
32nd	2019 by-election	Pádraig O'Sullivan (FF)	Jonathan O'Brien (SF)	Mick Barry (AAA–PBP)	Dara Murphy (FG)	4 seats from 2007
33rd	2020	Pádraig O'Sullivan (FF)	Thomas Gould (SF)	Mick Barry (S–PBP)	Colm Burke (FG)	4 seats from 2007
34th	2024	Pádraig O'Sullivan (FF)	Thomas Gould (SF)	Eoghan Kenny (Lab)	Colm Burke (FG)	Ken O'Flynn (II)
