= Denis Lyons =

Irish politician (1935–2014)

Minister of State
- 1991–1992: Tourism, Transport and Communications
- 1987–1991: Tourism and Transport

Teachta Dála
- In office June 1981 – November 1992
- Constituency: Cork North-Central

Personal details
- Born: 1 August 1935 County Cork, Ireland
- Died: 7 July 2014 (aged 78) County Cork, Ireland
- Party: Fianna Fáil
- Spouse: Catherine Lyons
- Children: 6

Denis Lyons (1 August 1935 – 7 July 2014) was an Irish Fianna Fáil politician.

Lyons was elected to Cork County Council in 1972. He was elected to Dáil Éireann on his first attempt, at the 1981 general election, when he was one of two Fianna Fáil candidates returned to the 22nd Dáil as TDs for the Cork North-Central constituency. He was re-elected at the next four general elections, until his defeat at the 1992 general election.

He achieved ministerial office in 1987, in the 25th Dáil, when Fianna Fáil returned to power under Taoiseach Charles Haughey and formed the 29th Government of Ireland. In March 1987, he was appointed as Minister of State at the Department of Tourism and Transport with responsibility for Tourism.

At the 1989 general election Fianna Fáil hoped to increase its representation in the 26th Dáil but instead lost seats, and entered a coalition government with the Progressive Democrats. Lyons returned to his previous job as Minister of State, this time in the renamed Department of Tourism, Transport and Communications. He left ministerial office in a reshuffle on 11 February 1992, when Albert Reynolds took over as Taoiseach.

At the 1992 general election, Fianna Fáil won only one seat in the five-seater Cork North-Central constituency, and Fine Gael's Liam Burke replaced Lyons in the 27th Dáil. Lyons then stood unsuccessfully at the 1993 Seanad Éireann election for the Industrial and Commercial Panel. He contested the 1997 Seanad election for the Cultural and Educational Panel but again lost, and then retired from politics.

He died on 7 July 2014.

Dáil	Election	Deputy (Party)	Deputy (Party)	Deputy (Party)	Deputy (Party)	Deputy (Party)
22nd	1981	Toddy O'Sullivan (Lab)	Liam Burke (FG)	Denis Lyons (FF)	Bernard Allen (FG)	Seán French (FF)
23rd	1982 (Feb)	Toddy O'Sullivan (Lab)	Liam Burke (FG)	Denis Lyons (FF)	Bernard Allen (FG)	Seán French (FF)
24th	1982 (Nov)	Toddy O'Sullivan (Lab)	Liam Burke (FG)	Denis Lyons (FF)	Bernard Allen (FG)	Dan Wallace (FF)
25th	1987	Máirín Quill (PDs)	Liam Burke (FG)	Denis Lyons (FF)	Bernard Allen (FG)	Dan Wallace (FF)
26th	1989	Máirín Quill (PDs)	Gerry O'Sullivan (Lab)	Denis Lyons (FF)	Bernard Allen (FG)	Dan Wallace (FF)
27th	1992	Máirín Quill (PDs)	Gerry O'Sullivan (Lab)	Liam Burke (FG)	Bernard Allen (FG)	Dan Wallace (FF)
27th	1994 by-election	Máirín Quill (PDs)	Kathleen Lynch (DL)	Liam Burke (FG)	Bernard Allen (FG)	Dan Wallace (FF)
28th	1997	Billy Kelleher (FF)	Noel O'Flynn (FF)	Liam Burke (FG)	Bernard Allen (FG)	Dan Wallace (FF)
29th	2002	Billy Kelleher (FF)	Noel O'Flynn (FF)	Kathleen Lynch (Lab)	Bernard Allen (FG)	Dan Wallace (FF)
30th	2007	Billy Kelleher (FF)	Noel O'Flynn (FF)	Kathleen Lynch (Lab)	Bernard Allen (FG)	4 seats from 2007
31st	2011	Billy Kelleher (FF)	Jonathan O'Brien (SF)	Kathleen Lynch (Lab)	Dara Murphy (FG)	4 seats from 2007
32nd	2016	Billy Kelleher (FF)	Jonathan O'Brien (SF)	Mick Barry (AAA–PBP)	Dara Murphy (FG)	4 seats from 2007
32nd	2019 by-election	Pádraig O'Sullivan (FF)	Jonathan O'Brien (SF)	Mick Barry (AAA–PBP)	Dara Murphy (FG)	4 seats from 2007
33rd	2020	Pádraig O'Sullivan (FF)	Thomas Gould (SF)	Mick Barry (S–PBP)	Colm Burke (FG)	4 seats from 2007
34th	2024	Pádraig O'Sullivan (FF)	Thomas Gould (SF)	Eoghan Kenny (Lab)	Colm Burke (FG)	Ken O'Flynn (II)
