= Kathleen Lynch (politician) =

Irish former politician (born 1953)

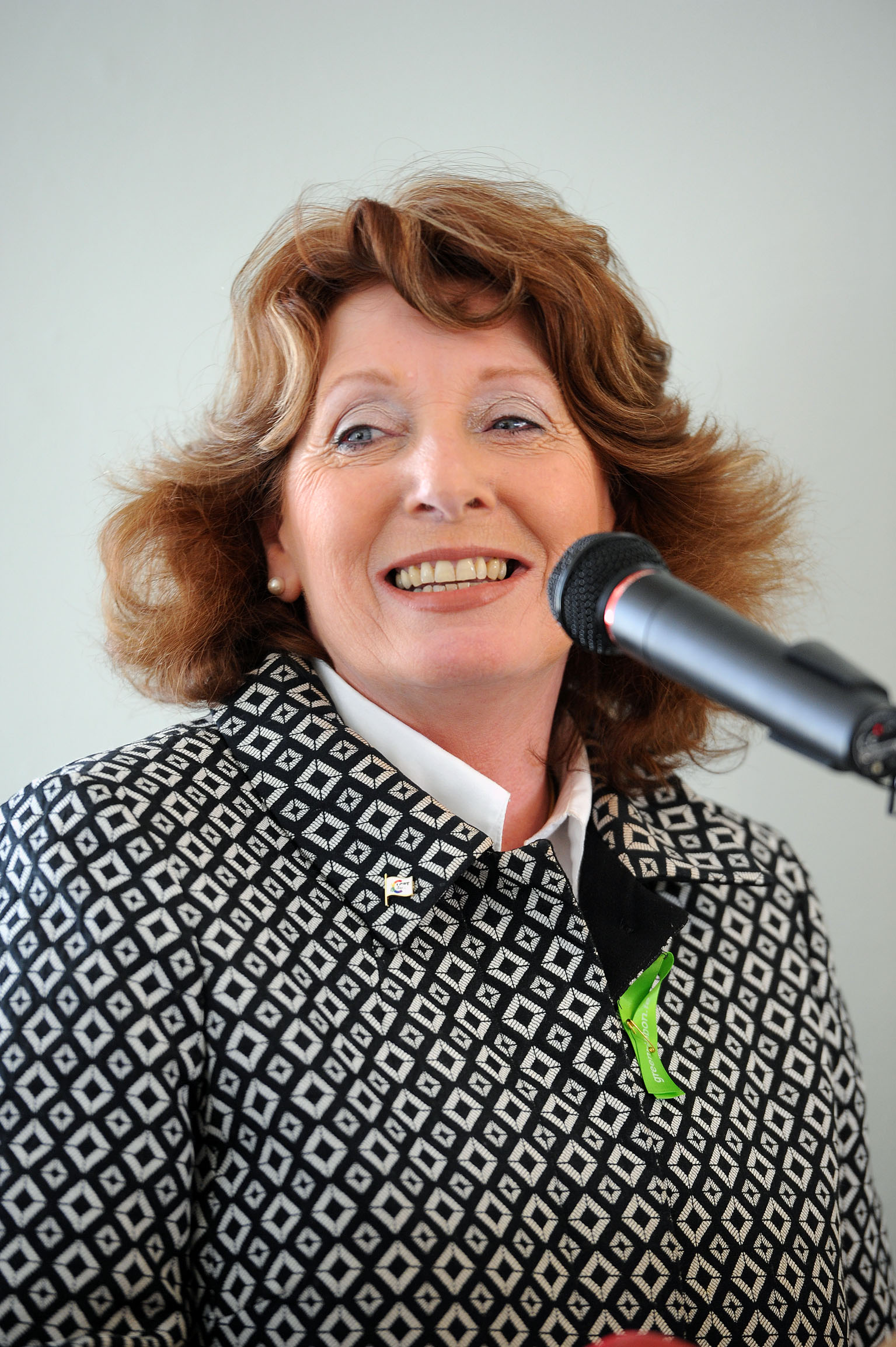
- Lynch in 2013

Minister of State
- 2011–2016: Health
- 2011–2014: Justice and Equality

Teachta Dála
- In office May 2002 – February 2016
- In office November 1994 – June 1997
- Constituency: Cork North-Central

Personal details
- Born: 7 June 1953 (age 73) Cork, Ireland
- Party: Labour Party
- Other political affiliations: Democratic Left; Workers' Party
- Spouse: Bernard Lynch
- Children: 4
- Education: University College Cork

Kathleen Lynch (born 7 June 1953) is an Irish former Labour Party politician who served as Minister of State from 2011 to 2016. She served as a Teachta Dála (TD) for the Cork North-Central constituency from 1994 to 1997 and 2002 to 2016.

== Early and personal life ==
Kathleen Lynch was born in Cork in 1953. She is married to Bernard Lynch and they have three daughters and one son. Bernard Lynch was a member of Official Sinn Féin. She is a sister-in-law to Ciarán Lynch who was a Labour Party TD for Cork South-Central from 2007 to 2016 and of Cork City Council Councilor Catherine Clancy, who originally had been co-opted to replace her on the council.

== Political career ==
=== 1985 to 2009 ===
She first held political office in 1985 when she was elected to Cork Corporation for the Workers' Party. She came to prominence as a campaigner against service charges being introduced by the corporation. When that party split in 1992, Lynch and other members of the Cork organisation were initially undecided as to their stance, but she subsequently decided to follow former party president Proinsias De Rossa and the bulk of the party's TDs into the new organisation which later took the name Democratic Left. Lynch was first elected to Dáil Éireann as Democratic Left TD for Cork North-Central at a by-election in 1994 caused by the death of Labour Party TD Gerry O'Sullivan. She lost her Dáil seat at the 1997 general election but was re-elected again at the 2002 general election, this time for the Labour Party following the merger of Democratic Left with that party in 1999.

In April 2008, she was involved in a controversy where she wrote a letter testifying the good character of the parents of a man accused of raping two teenage sisters. The man was convicted and sentenced for 13 years. In a statement she said: "Having heard an interview with one of the victims in the case, who was clearly distressed by my letter and having considered the matter and discussed it with colleagues I now accept that it was inappropriate for a TD to have become involved in any way in a case of such seriousness. If my action has in any way added to the ordeal of the two victims in this case, then I deeply regret that and offer them my apologies."

=== 2010s ===
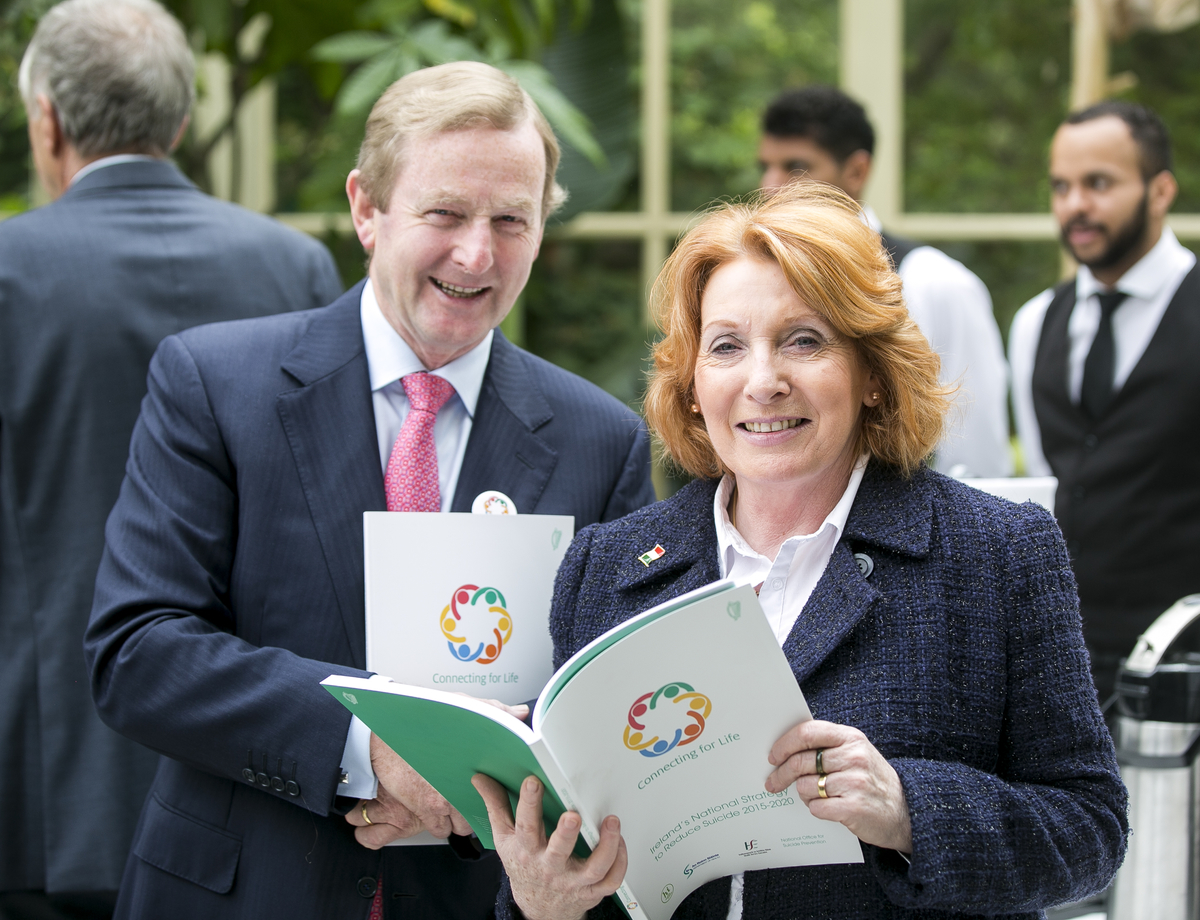
Lynch alongside Taoiseach Enda Kenny in 2015

On 10 March 2011, she was appointed by the Fine Gael–Labour coalition government as Minister of State at the Department of Health and at the Department of Justice and Equality with special responsibility for Disability, Equality and Mental Health. On 15 July 2014, she was redesignated as Minister of State with special responsibility for Primary Care, Mental Health and Disability, after her brief in Equality was allocated to Aodhán Ó Riordáin. In June 2011, Lynch caused controversy when she appointed her husband, Bernard, to the role as a personal assistant, which is a taxpayer-funded role.

She lost her seat at the February 2016 general election. She remained as a junior minister until 6 May 2016 during the prolonged talks on government formation.

Shortly after losing her seat Lynch gave an interview to Catherine Shanahan of the Irish Examiner in which, among other things, she praised former cabinet colleagues James Reilly and Alan Shatter, was scathing of Leo Varadkar, Michael McDowell and Róisín Shortall, spoke of her preference for Brendan Howlin (or even Seán Sherlock) over Alan Kelly, and stated that she had no idea as to why Máiría Cahill was chosen as the party's Seanad by-election candidate.

Dáil	Election	Deputy (Party)	Deputy (Party)	Deputy (Party)	Deputy (Party)	Deputy (Party)
22nd	1981	Toddy O'Sullivan (Lab)	Liam Burke (FG)	Denis Lyons (FF)	Bernard Allen (FG)	Seán French (FF)
23rd	1982 (Feb)	Toddy O'Sullivan (Lab)	Liam Burke (FG)	Denis Lyons (FF)	Bernard Allen (FG)	Seán French (FF)
24th	1982 (Nov)	Toddy O'Sullivan (Lab)	Liam Burke (FG)	Denis Lyons (FF)	Bernard Allen (FG)	Dan Wallace (FF)
25th	1987	Máirín Quill (PDs)	Liam Burke (FG)	Denis Lyons (FF)	Bernard Allen (FG)	Dan Wallace (FF)
26th	1989	Máirín Quill (PDs)	Gerry O'Sullivan (Lab)	Denis Lyons (FF)	Bernard Allen (FG)	Dan Wallace (FF)
27th	1992	Máirín Quill (PDs)	Gerry O'Sullivan (Lab)	Liam Burke (FG)	Bernard Allen (FG)	Dan Wallace (FF)
27th	1994 by-election	Máirín Quill (PDs)	Kathleen Lynch (DL)	Liam Burke (FG)	Bernard Allen (FG)	Dan Wallace (FF)
28th	1997	Billy Kelleher (FF)	Noel O'Flynn (FF)	Liam Burke (FG)	Bernard Allen (FG)	Dan Wallace (FF)
29th	2002	Billy Kelleher (FF)	Noel O'Flynn (FF)	Kathleen Lynch (Lab)	Bernard Allen (FG)	Dan Wallace (FF)
30th	2007	Billy Kelleher (FF)	Noel O'Flynn (FF)	Kathleen Lynch (Lab)	Bernard Allen (FG)	4 seats from 2007
31st	2011	Billy Kelleher (FF)	Jonathan O'Brien (SF)	Kathleen Lynch (Lab)	Dara Murphy (FG)	4 seats from 2007
32nd	2016	Billy Kelleher (FF)	Jonathan O'Brien (SF)	Mick Barry (AAA–PBP)	Dara Murphy (FG)	4 seats from 2007
32nd	2019 by-election	Pádraig O'Sullivan (FF)	Jonathan O'Brien (SF)	Mick Barry (AAA–PBP)	Dara Murphy (FG)	4 seats from 2007
33rd	2020	Pádraig O'Sullivan (FF)	Thomas Gould (SF)	Mick Barry (S–PBP)	Colm Burke (FG)	4 seats from 2007
34th	2024	Pádraig O'Sullivan (FF)	Thomas Gould (SF)	Eoghan Kenny (Lab)	Colm Burke (FG)	Ken O'Flynn (II)
