= South (European Parliament constituency) =

Irish constituency of the European Parliament

- European Parliament constituency
- Location among the current constituencies

- South shown within Ireland (2014–2019, 2024– boundaries)
- Member state: Ireland
- Created: 2004
- MEPs: 3 (2004–2014); 4 (2014–2020); 5 (2020–)

South is a European Parliament constituency in Ireland. It elects five Members of the European Parliament (MEPs) using proportional representation by means of the single transferable vote.

== History and boundaries ==
It was created in 2004 with the same area as the old Munster constituency, except for County Clare which was then in North-West. It was expanded in 2014 when it took in counties of southern Leinster from the disbanded East constituency and became a 4-seat constituency. In 2016, 74.1% of the constituency's population lived in Munster, while the southern Leinster counties accounted for 25.9%.

The constituency is often referred to by media sources and candidates as "Ireland South" during news reports or candidate remarks.

At the 2019 European Parliament election, a reapportionment following Brexit and the loss of 73 MEPs from the United Kingdom gave two additional seats to Ireland. Following a recommendation of the Constituency Commission, South gained territory and an additional seat, from 4 to 5. However, the last candidate elected, would not take her seat until after the United Kingdom left the European Union.

At the 2024 European Parliament election, the counties of Laois and Offaly were transferred to Midlands–North-West, while South remains a 5-seat constituency. This followed a recommendation of the Electoral Commission, where Ireland had been allocated one additional MEP.

It comprises the counties of Carlow, Clare, Cork, Kerry, Kilkenny, Limerick, Tipperary, Waterford, Wexford, and Wicklow; the cities of Cork, Limerick, and Waterford.

The main urban areas (by population size) are Cork, Limerick, Waterford, Bray, Kilkenny, Ennis, Carlow, Tralee, and Wexford.

Elections	Area	Seats
2004, 2009	Counties of Cork, Kerry, Limerick, Tipperary and Waterford; and the cities of Cork, Limerick and Waterford.	3
2014	Addition of counties Carlow, Kilkenny, Wexford and Wicklow from East; and Clare from North-West.	4
2019	Addition of counties Laois and Offaly from Midlands–North-West	4/5
2024	Loss of Laois and Offaly to Midlands–North-West	5

== MEPs ==
2019–2024 boundaries

Members of the European Parliament (MEPs) for South 2004–
Key to parties: FF = Fianna Fáil; FG = Fine Gael; GP = Green; Ind. = Independent; I4C = Inds. 4 Change; Lab = Labour; SF = Sinn Féin
Parl.	Election	Member (Party)	Member (Party)	Member (Party)	Member (Party)	Member (Party)
6th	2004	Kathy Sinnott (Ind.)	Brian Crowley (FF)	Simon Coveney (FG)	3 seats 2004–2014	
6th	2007 (Note: Simon Coveney was re-elected to the 30th Dáil and was substituted by Colm Burke (FG / EPP-ED) on 19 June 2007.)	Kathy Sinnott (Ind.)	Brian Crowley (FF)	Colm Burke (FG)	3 seats 2004–2014	
7th	2009	Alan Kelly (Lab)	Brian Crowley (FF)	Seán Kelly (FG)	3 seats 2004–2014	
7th	2011 (Note: Alan Kelly was elected to the 31st Dáil and was substituted by Phil Prendergast (Lab / S&D) on 21 April 2011.)	Phil Prendergast (Lab)	Brian Crowley (FF)	Seán Kelly (FG)	3 seats 2004–2014	
8th	2014	Liadh Ní Riada (SF)	Brian Crowley (FF)	Seán Kelly (FG)	Deirdre Clune (FG)	4 seats 2014–2019
9th	2019	Mick Wallace (I4C)	Billy Kelleher (FF)	Seán Kelly (FG)	Vacant	Grace O'Sullivan (GP)
9th	2020 (Note: Deirdre Clune, the last elected candidate in 2019, was not an MEP between the time of the 2019 election (24 May 2019) and the United Kingdom's withdrawal from the EU (31 January 2020). This is because the reallocation of European Parliament seats did not take effect until after Brexit.)	Mick Wallace (I4C)	Billy Kelleher (FF)	Seán Kelly (FG)	Deirdre Clune (FG)	Grace O'Sullivan (GP)
10th	2024	Kathleen Funchion (SF)	Billy Kelleher (FF)	Seán Kelly (FG)	Cynthia Ní Mhurchú (FF)	Michael McNamara (Ind)

Note: The columns in this table are used only for presentational purposes, and no significance should be attached to the order of columns. For details of the order in which seats were won at each election, see the detailed results of that election.

== Elections ==
*: Outgoing MEP elected at the previous election.
†: Outgoing MEP co-opted subsequent to the previous election.

=== 2024 election ===
2024 European Parliament election: South (5 seats)
Party	Candidate	FPv%	Count																			
Party	Candidate	FPv%	1	2	3	4	5	6	7	8	9	10	11	12	13	14	15	16	17	18	19	20
Fine Gael	Seán Kelly	17.83	122,777																			
Fianna Fáil	Billy Kelleher	13.23	91,074	93,037	93,084	93,290	93,388	93,675	93,777	93,959	94,419	95,042	95,405	96,786	99,778	100,832	103,492	106,051	107,834	120,105		
Independent	Michael McNamara	8.18	56,339	56,862	57,174	57,298	57,497	57,633	57,809	58,897	59,752	60,285	62,591	64,761	66,656	67,507	74,197	75,570	83,702	86,757	87,542	92,871
Fianna Fáil	Cynthia Ní Mhurchú	8.02	55,209	55,979	56,048	56,259	56,380	56,541	56,780	57,144	57,467	57,913	58,278	59,194	61,259	61,780	63,540	65,361	66,198	72,523	75,900	92,502
Inds. 4 Change	Mick Wallace	7.67	52,803	53,193	53,428	53,701	54,107	54,386	55,600	55,967	56,327	56,979	57,989	59,511	60,547	61,668	64,637	67,146	71,910	73,714	73,947	84,157
Sinn Féin	Kathleen Funchion	7.35	50,580	50,723	50,755	50,955	51,176	51,501	51,984	52,106	52,565	53,300	53,655	54,297	55,600	71,350	72,081	76,697	81,268	82,315	82,508	90,070
Green	Grace O'Sullivan	6.92	47,661	48,022	48,093	48,239	48,304	48,576	49,139	49,289	49,492	50,420	50,576	51,290	54,621	54,978	55,660	63,335	63,923	68,441	69,197	
Fine Gael	John Mullins	4.83	33,281	35,914	35,951	36,155	36,268	36,373	36,460	36,599	36,743	36,984	37,212	37,950	39,525	39,832	41,397	42,831	43,601			
Ireland First	Derek Blighe	3.64	25,071	25,128	25,263	25,401	26,192	26,564	26,752	27,640	28,105	28,886	33,111	34,836	35,267	35,739	37,742	38,625				
Sinn Féin	Paul Gavan	3.25	22,392	22,512	22,530	22,617	22,789	22,895	23,186	23,242	23,508	23,806	24,109	24,623	25,521							
Labour	Niamh Hourigan	3.09	21,272	21,546	21,566	21,709	21,822	22,006	22,352	22,523	22,988	23,679	23,892	24,211								
Independent Ireland	Eddie Punch	3.01	20,751	20,920	21,018	21,080	21,212	21,258	21,663	21,903	22,114	22,237	23,509	25,221	25,787	26,167						
Social Democrats	Susan Doyle	2.94	20,229	20,344	20,372	20,566	20,630	21,229	21,992	22,110	22,407	25,138	25,253	25,725	28,589	29,163	29,617					
Aontú	Patrick Murphy	2.05	14,124	14,199	14,384	14,417	14,548	14,638	14,802	15,075	15,705	15,811	17,421									
Irish Freedom	Michael Leahy	1.78	12,259	12,320	12,476	12,527	13,128	13,201	13,301	14,390	15,067	15,183										
Rabharta	Lorna Bogue (Note: Did not appear on the ballot as Rabharta. The Electoral Commission proposed the registration of the party to contest European and local elections on 12 April. However, as the proposed decision was subject to a 21-day appeal period, it was not in force for the 7 June 2024 elections.)	1.28	8,788	8,844	8,916	9,027	9,086	9,584	10,040	10,279	10,826											
Independent	Una Mc Gurk	0.93	6,387	6,469	6,584	6,628	6,729	6,828	6,888													
Independent	Mary Fitzgibbon	0.91	6,281	6,379	6,578	7,139	7,272	7,684	7,794	8,328												
PBP–Solidarity	Cian Prendiville	0.91	6,243	6,274	6,340	6,382	6,516	6,650														
Independent	Graham de Barra	0.66	4,575	4,607	4,684	4,810	4,906															
The Irish People	Ross Lahive	0.65	4,461	4,492	4,574	4,636																
Independent	Christopher V.S. Doyle	0.51	3,530	3,554	3,592																	
Independent	Ciaran O'Riordan	0.36	2,477	2,485																		
Electorate: 1,345,792 Valid: 688,564 Spoilt: 24,759 Quota: 114,761 Turnout: 713,323 (53.0%)

=== 2019 election ===
South elected 5 MEPs but the 5th candidate elected, Deirdre Clune, did not take her seat until 31 January 2020, when the United Kingdom had withdrawn from the European Union.

2019 European Parliament election: South (5* seats)
Party	Candidate	FPv%	Count																			
Party	Candidate	FPv%	1	2	3	4	5	6	7	8	9	10	11	12	13	14	15	16	17	18	19	20
Fine Gael	Seán Kelly	16.47	118,446	118,491	118,677	118,775	119,125	119,382	119,547	119,717	119,885											
Fianna Fáil	Billy Kelleher	11.69	84,084	84,107	84,165	84,239	84,389	84,560	84,655	84,842	84,972	85,452	86,027	87,037	87,966	88,604	89,040	92,893	131,665			
Inds. 4 Change	Mick Wallace	11.37	81,780	82,033	82,163	82,374	82,697	82,903	83,459	83,811	84,028	84,276	85,277	87,613	88,806	90,285	95,834	101,792	109,221	112,528	139,529	
Sinn Féin	Liadh Ní Riada	10.99	78,995	79,062	79,204	79,309	79,494	79,662	79,864	80,165	80,292	80,732	81,721	82,839	83,790	84,892	87,214	91,727	95,446	98,248		
Green	Grace O'Sullivan	10.56	75,887	75,986	76,188	76,314	76,584	76,658	76,959	77,243	77,355	77,694	78,757	80,050	80,645	81,932	84,671	93,037	95,996	98,606	114,287	119,701
Fianna Fáil	Malcolm Byrne	9.62	69,167	69,202	69,273	69,317	69,383	69,512	69,557	69,673	70,899	71,169	71,843	72,134	72,854	73,783	74,371	80,624				
Fine Gael	Deirdre Clune	8.98	64,605	64,631	64,692	64,764	64,900	65,006	65,116	65,253	65,559	66,050	66,733	67,277	67,899	69,096	69,566	89,755	97,956	101,047	110,085	112,162
Fine Gael	Andrew Doyle	5.39	38,738	38,755	38,788	38,804	38,842	38,926	38,950	38,996	39,294	39,429	39,855	40,014	40,586	41,069	41,416					
Labour	Sheila Nunan	3.07	22,082	22,120	22,200	22,259	22,329	22,391	22,461	22,634	22,708	22,901	23,527	23,857	24,342	24,943	25,969					
Solidarity–PBP	Adrienne Wallace	2.06	14,810	14,966	15,017	15,216	15,362	15,403	15,795	16,116	16,217	16,387	16,917	17,407	17,736	18,485						
Independent	Dolores Cahill	1.47	10,582	10,639	10,746	10,884	10,938	11,238	11,397	11,720	12,628	14,213	15,039	15,470	17,135							
Independent	Diarmuid O'Flynn	1.37	9,828	9,865	9,941	9,995	10,179	10,231	10,399	10,613	10,661	10,948	11,157									
Independent	Liam Minehan	1.31	9,426	9,458	9,783	9,858	9,972	10,253	10,331	10,468	10,547	11,707	12,275	12,774								
Independent	Breda Gardner	1.29	9,306	9,331	9,401	9,436	9,496	9,724	9,869	9,975	10,222	10,838										
Independent	Theresa Heaney	1.04	7,475	7,498	7,596	7,738	7,808	8,005	8,197	8,373	8,561											
Independent	Allan Brennan	0.65	4,665	4,691	4,734	4,791	4,841	4,956	5,028	5,132												
Identity Ireland	Peter O'Loughlin	0.51	3,685	3,762	3,806	3,922	4,009	4,050	4,184													
Independent	Colleen Worthington	0.46	3,285	3,306	3,319	3,551	3,653	3,713														
Independent	Paddy Fitzgerald	0.44	3,183	3,198	3,258	3,301	3,333															
Independent	Walter Ryan-Purcell	0.40	2,863	2,897	2,918	3,066																
Independent	Maurice Sexton	0.34	2,419	2,467	2,545																	
Independent	Peter Madden	0.33	2,397	2,411																		
Direct Democracy	Jan van de Ven	0.20	1,421																			
Electorate: 1,417,017 Valid: 719,194 Spoilt: 36,793 Quota: 119,866 Turnout: 53.4%

Following a recheck of the votes for O'Sullivan and Ní Riada after the 18th count, a full recount was requested by the Sinn Féin candidate. Returning officer Martin Harvey announced that the recount would begin on 4 June. RTÉ reported that the recount could take up to 28 working days. On 4 June, Ní Riada withdrew the request for a recount. After the transfer of Ní Riada's votes and Mick Wallace's surplus, Grace O'Sullivan and Deirdre Clune were deemed elected, but Clune did not take office as an MEP until Brexit had taken effect.

=== 2014 election ===
2014 European Parliament election: South (4 seats)
Party	Candidate	FPv%	Count											
Party	Candidate	FPv%	1	2	3	4	5	6	7	8	9	10	11	12
Fianna Fáil	Brian Crowley	27.4	180,329											
Sinn Féin	Liadh Ní Riada	19.1	125,309	129,957	130,840	132,590								
Fine Gael	Seán Kelly	12.7	83,520	92,042	92,355	92,758	93,106	94,266	95,683	95,736	98,646	106,068	113,311	121,566
Fine Gael	Simon Harris	7.8	51,483	53,912	54,161	54,511	55,273	56,050	56,691	56,738	59,056	63,536	66,061	70,808
Fine Gael	Deirdre Clune	7.2	47,453	51,850	52,097	52,295	52,798	54,081	55,293	55,340	58,311	64,889	69,009	74,370
Independent	Diarmuid O'Flynn	4.6	30,323	31,649	33,311	34,840	36,198	38,960	43,628	44,023	48,125	51,387		
Labour	Phil Prendergast	4.6	30,317	32,360	32,664	33,147	33,560	34,150	34,874	34,939	42,213			
Fianna Fáil	Kieran Hartley	4.6	29,987	50,349	50,653	50,953	51,475	52,481	54,475	54,559	56,746	59,722	64,357	
Green	Grace O'Sullivan	4.2	27,860	29,360	29,999	31,075	31,962	32,829	34,443	34,607				
Catholic Democrats	Theresa Heaney	2.1	13,569	14,677	15,159	15,655	17,016	19,114						
Independent	Richard Cahill	1.6	10,719	11,661	12,408	13,152	15,310							
Direct Democracy	Jan van de Ven	1.4	9,255	9,586	10,125									
Independent	Jillian Godsil	1.4	9,179	9,829	10,607	11,531								
Independent	Peter O'Loughlin	1.0	6,561	7,000										
Fís Nua	Dónal Ó Ríordáin	0.2	1,634	1,766										
Electorate: 1,221,683 Valid: 657,498 Spoilt: 21,798 (3.2%) Quota: 131,500 Turnout: 679,296 (55.6%)

=== 2009 election ===
2009 European Parliament election: South (3 seats)
Party	Candidate	FPv%	Count							
Party	Candidate	FPv%	1	2	3	4	5	6	7	8
Fianna Fáil	Brian Crowley	23.7	118,258	119,625	122,404	132,410				
Fine Gael	Seán Kelly	18.6	92,579	94,430	96,153	97,482	98,394	134,712		
Sinn Féin	Toiréasa Ferris	13.0	64,671	65,861	67,304	68,296	69,295	73,389	74,480	
Labour	Alan Kelly	12.9	64,152	66,121	69,683	70,309	70,991	78,651	83,921	105,597
Independent	Kathy Sinnott	11.7	58,485	62,057	64,295	65,518	66,920	71,349	75,168	95,134
Fine Gael	Colm Burke	10.8	53,721	54,617	57,190	57,884	58,654			
Fianna Fáil	Ned O'Keeffe	3.3	16,596	16,896	17,124					
Green	Dan Boyle	3.1	15,499	16,250						
Independent	Alexander Stafford	2.3	11,692							
Independent	Maurice Sexton	0.5	2,474							
Electorate: 861,727 Valid: 498,127 Spoilt: 11,836 (2.3%) Quota: 124,532 Turnout: 509,963 (59.2%)

=== 2004 election ===
2004–2009 South constituency boundaries

2004 European Parliament election: South (3 seats)
Party	Candidate	FPv%	Count					
Party	Candidate	FPv%	1	2	3	4	5	6
Fianna Fáil	Brian Crowley	25.9	125,539					
Fine Gael	Simon Coveney	24.6	118,937	120,261	120,537	121,332		
Independent	Kathy Sinnott	18.4	89,127	89,872	90,175	92,010	97,057	120,600
Fianna Fáil	Gerry Collins	15.1	73,131	74,991	75,246	75,577	78,367	87,658
Sinn Féin	David Cullinane	6.7	32,643	32,848	32,977	33,561	35,385	
Labour	Brendan Ryan	4.1	19,975	20,086	20,170	20,576	24,406	
Green	Chris O'Leary	2.3	10,896	10,980	11,056	11,478		
Independent	Gerry Hannan	1.3	6,394	6,428	6,551	6,934		
Independent	Lily Moynihan	1.2	5,831	5,914	6,048			
Independent	Anthony O'Connor	0.4	1,797	1,822				
Electorate: 802,359 Valid: 484,270 Spoilt: 14,124 (2.8%) Quota: 121,068 Turnout: 498,394 (62.1%)
