= Jonathan O'Brien =

Irish former politician (born 1971)

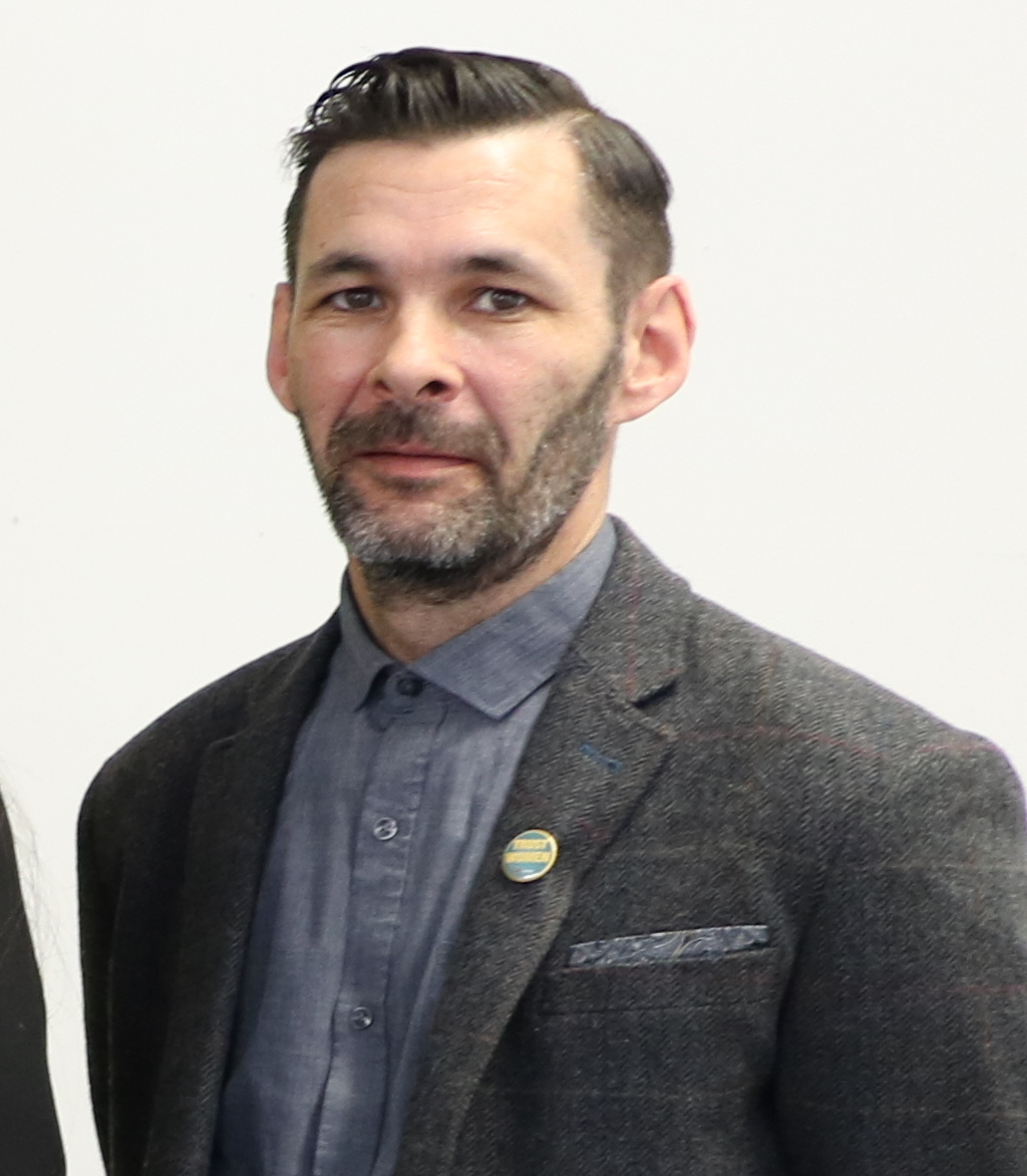
- O'Brien in 2017

Teachta Dála
- In office February 2011 – February 2020
- Constituency: Cork North-Central

Personal details
- Born: 28 December 1971 (age 54) Cork, Ireland
- Party: Sinn Féin
- Spouse: Gillian O'Brien (m. 2008)
- Children: 5
- Education: Cork Institute of Technology

Jonathan O'Brien (born 28 December 1971) is an Irish former Sinn Féin politician who served as a Teachta Dála (TD) for the Cork North-Central constituency from 2011 to 2020.

== Early life ==
O'Brien moved to Morecambe, Lancashire, in the early 1970s, where he lived for "six or seven years". He played for Rockmount A.F.C and made the Cork Schoolboys team. He was a teammate of Roy Keane.

== Political career and activities ==
He was a member of Cork City Council from 2000 to 2011. O'Brien also has a sporting background. He is a former board member and chairman of Cork City Football Club, having been a founding member of the supporters' trust, FORAS. He is also a member of St. Vincent's GAA Club.

O'Brien was criticised by the Minister of Education Ruairi Quinn over his position on the Household Charge. O'Brien responded by saying he had been elected to implement just and fair laws, and described the household tax as being neither.

He was the Sinn Féin Junior Spokesperson for Finance, and Public Expenditure and Reform.

On 6 January 2020, he announced that he would not contest the next general election.

Dáil	Election	Deputy (Party)	Deputy (Party)	Deputy (Party)	Deputy (Party)	Deputy (Party)
22nd	1981	Toddy O'Sullivan (Lab)	Liam Burke (FG)	Denis Lyons (FF)	Bernard Allen (FG)	Seán French (FF)
23rd	1982 (Feb)	Toddy O'Sullivan (Lab)	Liam Burke (FG)	Denis Lyons (FF)	Bernard Allen (FG)	Seán French (FF)
24th	1982 (Nov)	Toddy O'Sullivan (Lab)	Liam Burke (FG)	Denis Lyons (FF)	Bernard Allen (FG)	Dan Wallace (FF)
25th	1987	Máirín Quill (PDs)	Liam Burke (FG)	Denis Lyons (FF)	Bernard Allen (FG)	Dan Wallace (FF)
26th	1989	Máirín Quill (PDs)	Gerry O'Sullivan (Lab)	Denis Lyons (FF)	Bernard Allen (FG)	Dan Wallace (FF)
27th	1992	Máirín Quill (PDs)	Gerry O'Sullivan (Lab)	Liam Burke (FG)	Bernard Allen (FG)	Dan Wallace (FF)
27th	1994 by-election	Máirín Quill (PDs)	Kathleen Lynch (DL)	Liam Burke (FG)	Bernard Allen (FG)	Dan Wallace (FF)
28th	1997	Billy Kelleher (FF)	Noel O'Flynn (FF)	Liam Burke (FG)	Bernard Allen (FG)	Dan Wallace (FF)
29th	2002	Billy Kelleher (FF)	Noel O'Flynn (FF)	Kathleen Lynch (Lab)	Bernard Allen (FG)	Dan Wallace (FF)
30th	2007	Billy Kelleher (FF)	Noel O'Flynn (FF)	Kathleen Lynch (Lab)	Bernard Allen (FG)	4 seats from 2007
31st	2011	Billy Kelleher (FF)	Jonathan O'Brien (SF)	Kathleen Lynch (Lab)	Dara Murphy (FG)	4 seats from 2007
32nd	2016	Billy Kelleher (FF)	Jonathan O'Brien (SF)	Mick Barry (AAA–PBP)	Dara Murphy (FG)	4 seats from 2007
32nd	2019 by-election	Pádraig O'Sullivan (FF)	Jonathan O'Brien (SF)	Mick Barry (AAA–PBP)	Dara Murphy (FG)	4 seats from 2007
33rd	2020	Pádraig O'Sullivan (FF)	Thomas Gould (SF)	Mick Barry (S–PBP)	Colm Burke (FG)	4 seats from 2007
34th	2024	Pádraig O'Sullivan (FF)	Thomas Gould (SF)	Eoghan Kenny (Lab)	Colm Burke (FG)	Ken O'Flynn (II)
