= Colm Burke =

Irish politician (born 1957)

Colm Burke TD
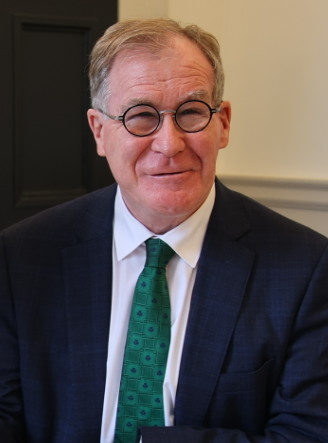
- Burke in 2024

Teachta Dála
- Incumbent
- Assumed office February 2020
- Constituency: Cork North-Central

Minister of State
- 2024–2025: Health

Senator
- In office 25 May 2011 – 8 February 2020
- Constituency: Industrial and Commercial Panel

Member of the European Parliament
- In office 19 June 2007 – 24 June 2009
- Constituency: South

Lord Mayor of Cork
- In office 6 June 2003 – 4 June 2004
- Preceded by: John Kelleher
- Succeeded by: Seán Martin

Personal details
- Born: 17 January 1957 (age 69) Cork, Ireland
- Party: Fine Gael
- Spouse: Mary McCaffrey (m. 1988)
- Education: University College Cork

Colm Burke (born 17 January 1957) is an Irish Fine Gael politician who has been a Teachta Dála (TD) for the Cork North-Central since the 2020 general election. He served as Minister of State at the Department of Health from 2024 to 2025, a Senator for the Industrial and Commercial Panel from 2011 to 2020, Member of the European Parliament (MEP) for the South constituency from 2007 to 2009 and Lord Mayor of Cork from 2003 to 2004.

He was a member of the European Parliament for the South constituency in Ireland between 2007 and 2009. He was appointed in June 2007, following the re-election of the outgoing MEP Simon Coveney to Dáil Éireann. Following the abolition of the dual mandate, Coveney opted to remain in national politics and resigned from the European Parliament. Burke subsequently sat as a Fine Gael and European People's Party MEP. He served on various European Parliament committees including Committee on Foreign Affairs, Internal Market & Consumer Protection (Substitute), Committee on Fisheries (Substitute Member) and Subcommittee on Human Rights (Substitute Member). Burke lost his seat at the 2009 European Parliament election, with Fine Gael party colleague Seán Kelly taking a seat instead.

Burke was a member of Cork City Council from 1999 to 2007 and served as Lord Mayor of Cork from 2003 to 2004. He was elected to Seanad Éireann in April 2011 and re-elected in 2016. He was the Fine Gael Seanad Spokesperson on Health.

He was an unsuccessful candidate at the 2019 Cork North-Central by-election. He was elected for the Cork North-Central constituency at the 2020 general election. During the campaign, the windows of his constituency office were smashed and posters were taken.

On 10 April 2024, Burke was appointed as Minister of State at the Department of Health following the appointment of Simon Harris as Taoiseach.

In July 2024, Burke, who had voted to repeal the Eighth Amendment in 2018, reported that he had been denied Holy Communion and informed that he was excommunicated during a funeral mass for a fellow Fine Gael member. The priest responsible for the incident would later confirm that his actions were in response to Burke's "support for abortion". The Association of Catholic Priests "unambiguously" condemned the incident and said that it was "not the role of the priest to judge the conscience of another person. The priest does not own the Eucharist".

At the 2024 general election, Burke was re-elected to the Dáil.

Civic offices
Preceded by John Kelleher	Lord Mayor of Cork; 2003	Succeeded by Seán Martin
Political offices
Preceded by Hildegarde Naughton	Minister of State at the Department of Health; 2024–2025	Succeeded by Jennifer Murnane O'Connor

Dáil	Election	Deputy (Party)	Deputy (Party)	Deputy (Party)	Deputy (Party)	Deputy (Party)
22nd	1981	Toddy O'Sullivan (Lab)	Liam Burke (FG)	Denis Lyons (FF)	Bernard Allen (FG)	Seán French (FF)
23rd	1982 (Feb)	Toddy O'Sullivan (Lab)	Liam Burke (FG)	Denis Lyons (FF)	Bernard Allen (FG)	Seán French (FF)
24th	1982 (Nov)	Toddy O'Sullivan (Lab)	Liam Burke (FG)	Denis Lyons (FF)	Bernard Allen (FG)	Dan Wallace (FF)
25th	1987	Máirín Quill (PDs)	Liam Burke (FG)	Denis Lyons (FF)	Bernard Allen (FG)	Dan Wallace (FF)
26th	1989	Máirín Quill (PDs)	Gerry O'Sullivan (Lab)	Denis Lyons (FF)	Bernard Allen (FG)	Dan Wallace (FF)
27th	1992	Máirín Quill (PDs)	Gerry O'Sullivan (Lab)	Liam Burke (FG)	Bernard Allen (FG)	Dan Wallace (FF)
27th	1994 by-election	Máirín Quill (PDs)	Kathleen Lynch (DL)	Liam Burke (FG)	Bernard Allen (FG)	Dan Wallace (FF)
28th	1997	Billy Kelleher (FF)	Noel O'Flynn (FF)	Liam Burke (FG)	Bernard Allen (FG)	Dan Wallace (FF)
29th	2002	Billy Kelleher (FF)	Noel O'Flynn (FF)	Kathleen Lynch (Lab)	Bernard Allen (FG)	Dan Wallace (FF)
30th	2007	Billy Kelleher (FF)	Noel O'Flynn (FF)	Kathleen Lynch (Lab)	Bernard Allen (FG)	4 seats from 2007
31st	2011	Billy Kelleher (FF)	Jonathan O'Brien (SF)	Kathleen Lynch (Lab)	Dara Murphy (FG)	4 seats from 2007
32nd	2016	Billy Kelleher (FF)	Jonathan O'Brien (SF)	Mick Barry (AAA–PBP)	Dara Murphy (FG)	4 seats from 2007
32nd	2019 by-election	Pádraig O'Sullivan (FF)	Jonathan O'Brien (SF)	Mick Barry (AAA–PBP)	Dara Murphy (FG)	4 seats from 2007
33rd	2020	Pádraig O'Sullivan (FF)	Thomas Gould (SF)	Mick Barry (S–PBP)	Colm Burke (FG)	4 seats from 2007
34th	2024	Pádraig O'Sullivan (FF)	Thomas Gould (SF)	Eoghan Kenny (Lab)	Colm Burke (FG)	Ken O'Flynn (II)
