= Billy Kelleher =

Irish politician (born 1968)

Billy Kelleher MEP
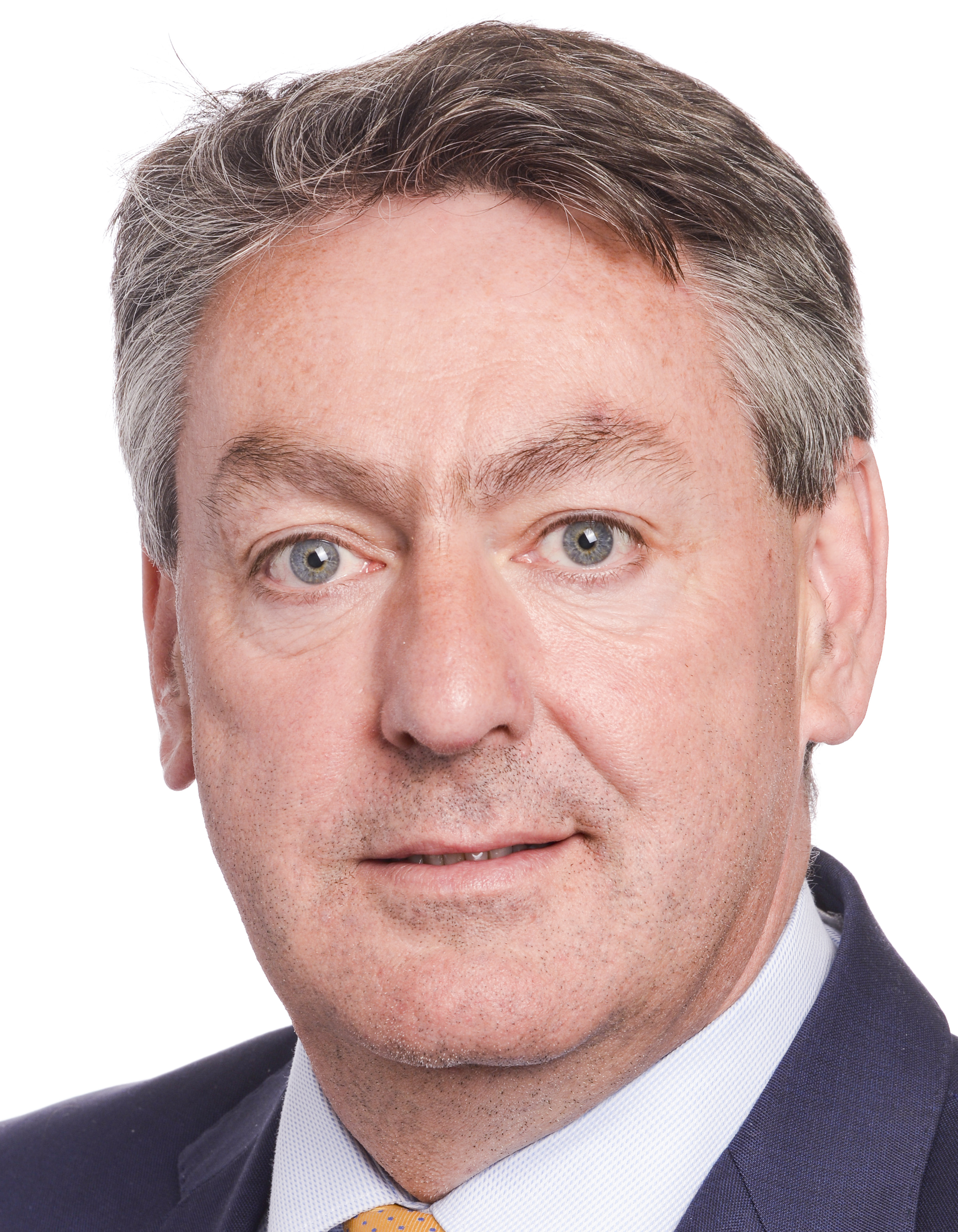
- Kelleher in 2019

Member of the European Parliament
- Incumbent
- Assumed office 2 July 2019
- Constituency: South

Minister of State
- 2007–2011: Enterprise, Trade and Employment

Teachta Dála
- In office June 1997 – July 2019
- Constituency: Cork North-Central

Senator
- In office 17 February 1993 – 6 June 1997
- Constituency: Nominated by the Taoiseach

Cork City Councillor
- In office 1999–2004
- Constituency: Cork City North East

Personal details
- Born: William Kelleher; 20 January 1968 (age 58) County Cork, Ireland
- Party: Ireland: Fianna Fáil; EU: Renew Europe
- Spouse: Liza Davis (m. 2002)
- Children: 3
- Education: Pallaskenry Agricultural College

William Kelleher (born 20 January 1968) is an Irish politician who has been a Member of the European Parliament (MEP) from Ireland for the South constituency since July 2019. He is a member of Fianna Fáil, part of Renew Europe. He was a Teachta Dála (TD) for the Cork North-Central constituency from 1997 to 2019 and a Senator as a Taoiseach's nominee from 1993 to 1997. He was a Minister of State from 2007 to 2011.

== Early and personal life ==
Kelleher, who is from the White's Cross/Glanmire area of County Cork, was educated at Sacred Heart College, Carrignavar, County Cork and at third level in Pallaskenry Agricultural College, County Limerick. He is married to Liza Davis. They have two daughters and one son. He is a cousin of the late Fine Gael TD Liam Burke. Prior to entering politics, he worked as a farmer.

== Political career ==
=== 20th Seanad ===
He was an unsuccessful candidate for Fianna Fáil in Cork North-Central at the 1992 general election, missing out by 25 votes. In December 1992, lawyers for Kelleher claimed that the election count did not select, as required by regulations, votes from the top of each sub-parcel (each parcel having come in to a candidate from a different, earlier candidate). Instead, they argued, votes to be transferred were selected by taking all of the content of a relatively few sub-parcels. In 1993, he was nominated to the 20th Seanad by the Taoiseach, Albert Reynolds.

=== Dáil Éireann (1997–2019) ===
Kelleher was elected to the 28th Dáil at the 1997 general election and retained his seat at the 2002, 2007, 2011 and 2016 general elections. He served as the assistant Government Chief Whip. In January 2006, Kelleher became embroiled in a minor controversy when he was caught speeding outside Cashel, County Tipperary on his way to Leinster House in Dublin. He was fined and received two penalty points on his driving licence. This came in a week when the government was coming under fire over poor road safety statistics.

After the 2007 general election, he was appointed as Minister of State at the Department of Enterprise, Trade and Employment, with special responsibility for labour affairs from 2007 to 2009 and with special responsibility for trade and commerce from 2009 to 2011.

He retained his seat at the 2011 general election, though an opinion poll from The Irish Times had predicted that he was in danger of losing his seat. Kelleher was the Fianna Fáil spokesperson on Health. He had called for a rise in the legal age to purchase alcohol from off-licences. He acted as Fianna Fáil's director of elections in 2016.

=== European Parliament (2019–present) ===
At the 2019 European Parliament election, he was elected as an MEP for Ireland South. Kelleher was a full member of the ANIT committee.

In 2020, he asked party leader Micheál Martin to instigate an independent inquiry into the Fianna Fáil party's decline.

In 2022, he was one of a number of Fianna Fáil politicians who signed a petition calling the government to expel the Russian ambassador following the 2022 Russian invasion of Ukraine. Kelleher travelled with Fianna Fáil senator Timmy Dooley to Poland and Ukraine. In Lviv, they met Andriy Sadovyi, the Mayor of Lviv, and Maksym Kozytskyi, the Governor of Lviv Oblast. When asked by RTÉ how many Ukrainian refugees Ireland should take in, Kelleher said that "Ireland will have to play its part in providing accommodation and lots of it." In March 2022, Kelleher said that Sinn Féin's decision to remove thousands of media statements shows that its position on "major issues have always been wrong. Even they're embarrassed by them." In April 2022, he asked Kerry Group (a company in which he owned shares) to cease operations in Russia. Kerry Group decided to suspend their operations in Russia and Belarus, which was welcomed by Kelleher.

In 2024, following the 2024 European Elections, Kelleher was elected (unopposed) as 1st Vice President of the Renew Europe Group, succeeding Malik Azmani from the VVD (Netherlands). Kelleher retained his full memberships of the Economic and Monetary Affairs (ECON) and Taxation (FISC) Committees, as well as the European Parliament's Delegation with the United States of America.

Kelleher sought to be nominated as Fianna Fáil's candidate in the 2025 presidential election, but Jim Gavin was selected as the party's nominee on 9 September 2025.

Political offices
Preceded by Tony Killeen	Minister of State for Labour Affairs; 2007–2009	Succeeded by Dara Calleary
Preceded by John McGuinness	Minister of State for Trade and Commerce; 2009–2011	Succeeded by Jan O'Sullivan

Dáil	Election	Deputy (Party)	Deputy (Party)	Deputy (Party)	Deputy (Party)	Deputy (Party)
22nd	1981	Toddy O'Sullivan (Lab)	Liam Burke (FG)	Denis Lyons (FF)	Bernard Allen (FG)	Seán French (FF)
23rd	1982 (Feb)	Toddy O'Sullivan (Lab)	Liam Burke (FG)	Denis Lyons (FF)	Bernard Allen (FG)	Seán French (FF)
24th	1982 (Nov)	Toddy O'Sullivan (Lab)	Liam Burke (FG)	Denis Lyons (FF)	Bernard Allen (FG)	Dan Wallace (FF)
25th	1987	Máirín Quill (PDs)	Liam Burke (FG)	Denis Lyons (FF)	Bernard Allen (FG)	Dan Wallace (FF)
26th	1989	Máirín Quill (PDs)	Gerry O'Sullivan (Lab)	Denis Lyons (FF)	Bernard Allen (FG)	Dan Wallace (FF)
27th	1992	Máirín Quill (PDs)	Gerry O'Sullivan (Lab)	Liam Burke (FG)	Bernard Allen (FG)	Dan Wallace (FF)
27th	1994 by-election	Máirín Quill (PDs)	Kathleen Lynch (DL)	Liam Burke (FG)	Bernard Allen (FG)	Dan Wallace (FF)
28th	1997	Billy Kelleher (FF)	Noel O'Flynn (FF)	Liam Burke (FG)	Bernard Allen (FG)	Dan Wallace (FF)
29th	2002	Billy Kelleher (FF)	Noel O'Flynn (FF)	Kathleen Lynch (Lab)	Bernard Allen (FG)	Dan Wallace (FF)
30th	2007	Billy Kelleher (FF)	Noel O'Flynn (FF)	Kathleen Lynch (Lab)	Bernard Allen (FG)	4 seats from 2007
31st	2011	Billy Kelleher (FF)	Jonathan O'Brien (SF)	Kathleen Lynch (Lab)	Dara Murphy (FG)	4 seats from 2007
32nd	2016	Billy Kelleher (FF)	Jonathan O'Brien (SF)	Mick Barry (AAA–PBP)	Dara Murphy (FG)	4 seats from 2007
32nd	2019 by-election	Pádraig O'Sullivan (FF)	Jonathan O'Brien (SF)	Mick Barry (AAA–PBP)	Dara Murphy (FG)	4 seats from 2007
33rd	2020	Pádraig O'Sullivan (FF)	Thomas Gould (SF)	Mick Barry (S–PBP)	Colm Burke (FG)	4 seats from 2007
34th	2024	Pádraig O'Sullivan (FF)	Thomas Gould (SF)	Eoghan Kenny (Lab)	Colm Burke (FG)	Ken O'Flynn (II)
