= Bernard Allen (Irish politician) =

Irish politician (1944–2024)

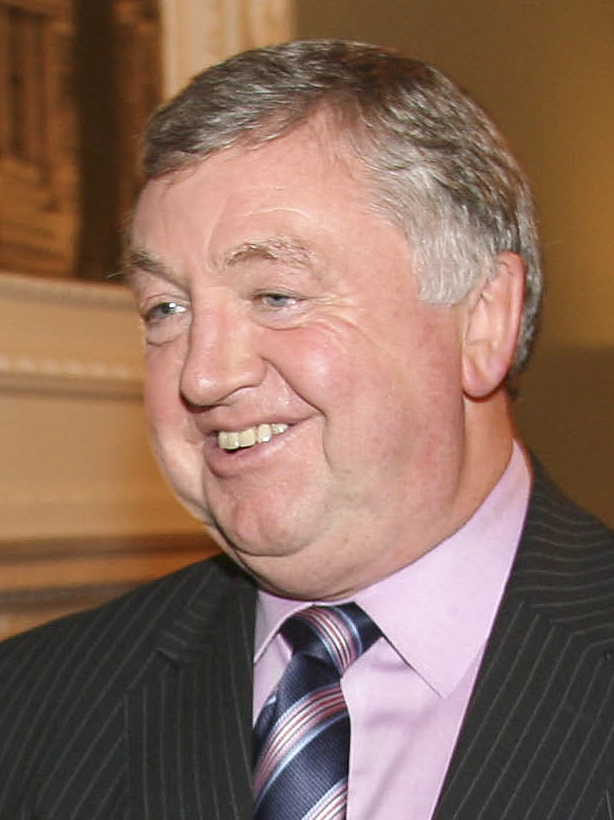
- Allen in 2006

Teachta Dála
- In office June 1981 – February 2011
- Constituency: Cork North-Central

Minister of State
- 1994–1997: Education
- 1994–1997: Environment

Personal details
- Born: 9 September 1944 Cork, Ireland
- Died: 22 June 2024 (aged 79) Cork, Ireland
- Party: Fine Gael
- Spouse: Marie Dorney
- Children: 3
- Education: University College Cork

Bernard Allen (9 September 1944 – 22 June 2024) was an Irish Fine Gael politician who served as Minister of State for Education and Minister of State for the Environment from 1994 to 1997. He served as a Teachta Dála (TD) for the Cork North-Central constituency from 1981 to 2011.

== Biography ==
Allen was born in Cork city in 1944. He was educated at the North Monastery school and University College Cork, where he qualified with a diploma in Chemical Technology. Allen first held political office in 1979 when he was elected to Cork Corporation, and was a member until 1995. He was elected to Dáil Éireann at the 1981 general election as a Fine Gael TD for the Cork North-Central constituency and retained his seat at each subsequent general election until his retirement in 2011. At the 1987 general election, Fine Gael lost power and Allen was appointed opposition spokesperson for Health. The following year he became Lord Mayor of Cork. In 1993, Allen became spokesperson for Social Welfare.

In 1994, Fine Gael returned to government and Taoiseach John Bruton appointed Allen as Minister of State at the Department of Education with special responsibility for Youth and Sport and at the Department of the Environment with special responsibility for local government reform. In February 2002 Michael Noonan became leader of Fine Gael and Allen was appointed spokesperson for Tourism, Sport and Recreation. Following the 2002 general election, Allen was one of the few high-profile Fine Gael TDs who were re-elected. Following this he was appointed opposition spokesperson for the Environment and Local Government under the new leader Enda Kenny. From 2004 to 2007, Allen was opposition spokesperson for Foreign Affairs and chairman of the Dáil sub-committee on European Affairs. From 2007 to 2011, he was chairman of the Dáil Public Accounts Committee.

Allen retired from politics at the 2011 general election. He was a member of the board of Sport Ireland.

Allen was married to Marie Dorney and they had three daughters. He died on 22 June 2024, at the age of 79.

Civic offices
| Preceded by Thomas Brosnan | Lord Mayor of Cork; 1988–1989 | Succeeded by Chrissie Aherne |
Political offices
| Preceded by Frank Fahey | Minister of State at the Department of Education; 1994–1997 | Office abolished |
| New office | Minister of State at the Department of the Environment; 1994–1997 | Office abolished |

| Dáil | Election | Deputy (Party) | Deputy (Party) | Deputy (Party) | Deputy (Party) | Deputy (Party) |
|---|---|---|---|---|---|---|
| 22nd | 1981 | Toddy O'Sullivan (Lab) | Liam Burke (FG) | Denis Lyons (FF) | Bernard Allen (FG) | Seán French (FF) |
| 23rd | 1982 (Feb) | Toddy O'Sullivan (Lab) | Liam Burke (FG) | Denis Lyons (FF) | Bernard Allen (FG) | Seán French (FF) |
| 24th | 1982 (Nov) | Toddy O'Sullivan (Lab) | Liam Burke (FG) | Denis Lyons (FF) | Bernard Allen (FG) | Dan Wallace (FF) |
| 25th | 1987 | Máirín Quill (PDs) | Liam Burke (FG) | Denis Lyons (FF) | Bernard Allen (FG) | Dan Wallace (FF) |
| 26th | 1989 | Máirín Quill (PDs) | Gerry O'Sullivan (Lab) | Denis Lyons (FF) | Bernard Allen (FG) | Dan Wallace (FF) |
| 27th | 1992 | Máirín Quill (PDs) | Gerry O'Sullivan (Lab) | Liam Burke (FG) | Bernard Allen (FG) | Dan Wallace (FF) |
| 27th | 1994 by-election | Máirín Quill (PDs) | Kathleen Lynch (DL) | Liam Burke (FG) | Bernard Allen (FG) | Dan Wallace (FF) |
| 28th | 1997 | Billy Kelleher (FF) | Noel O'Flynn (FF) | Liam Burke (FG) | Bernard Allen (FG) | Dan Wallace (FF) |
| 29th | 2002 | Billy Kelleher (FF) | Noel O'Flynn (FF) | Kathleen Lynch (Lab) | Bernard Allen (FG) | Dan Wallace (FF) |
| 30th | 2007 | Billy Kelleher (FF) | Noel O'Flynn (FF) | Kathleen Lynch (Lab) | Bernard Allen (FG) | 4 seats from 2007 |
| 31st | 2011 | Billy Kelleher (FF) | Jonathan O'Brien (SF) | Kathleen Lynch (Lab) | Dara Murphy (FG) | 4 seats from 2007 |
| 32nd | 2016 | Billy Kelleher (FF) | Jonathan O'Brien (SF) | Mick Barry (AAA–PBP) | Dara Murphy (FG) | 4 seats from 2007 |
| 32nd | 2019 by-election | Pádraig O'Sullivan (FF) | Jonathan O'Brien (SF) | Mick Barry (AAA–PBP) | Dara Murphy (FG) | 4 seats from 2007 |
| 33rd | 2020 | Pádraig O'Sullivan (FF) | Thomas Gould (SF) | Mick Barry (S–PBP) | Colm Burke (FG) | 4 seats from 2007 |
| 34th | 2024 | Pádraig O'Sullivan (FF) | Thomas Gould (SF) | Eoghan Kenny (Lab) | Colm Burke (FG) | Ken O'Flynn (II) |
