= Catholic Democrats (Ireland) =

Conservative Catholic minor political party in Ireland

- Logo of the Catholic Democrats c. 2010s
- Founder: Nora Bennis
- Founded: 1995
- Dissolved: c. 2019
- Ideology: Social conservatism Political Catholicism; Anti-abortion; Hard Euroscepticism
- Political position: Right-wing
- Address: 47 O'Connell St. Limerick

The Catholic Democrats was a minor conservative political party in Ireland that existed between 1995 and 2019. It was initially known as the National Party and later as the Christian Democrats before adopting its final name.

== History ==
It was founded in December 1995 by Nora Bennis, a Catholic values and anti-abortion activist. Bennis had attained approximately 5% of the vote in the 1994 European election in the Munster constituency, running under the Family First label. Bennis played a role in the campaign against the divorce referendum of that year, which passed with 50.3% of vote in favour. She had run a conservative pressure group called Family Solidarity. The creation of the party by the Limerick-based Bennis caused tension in conservative Catholic circles, because it followed the establishment of the Christian Solidarity Party by Gerard Casey and other Dublin-based activists, who named their party to show support for Bennis' group. The National Party aimed to attract the support of those who support traditional Catholic morality in legislation. The party's policies also included financial support for rural communities and a smaller role for the state in economic affairs.

The party had no electoral success at any level during its existence. The party was renamed the Christian Democrats in 1998, and then again during the course of 2012 as the Catholic Democrats. As of 2016, it was listed on the Register of Political Parties as "Catholic Democrats (The National Party)". They campaigned against the children referendum in 2012. Theresa Heaney from Cork ran, unsuccessfully, for the party in the 2014 European election in the South constituency.

The party ran three candidates in the 2016 general election; Bennis in Limerick City, Heaney in Cork South-West and Noel McKervey in Longford-Westmeath. None of them were elected.

By October 2016 they no longer appeared on the Register of Political Parties. In November 2017, the Standards in Public Office Commission stated that no statements of accounts had been received from the Catholic Democrats, in breach of the Electoral Act.

In February 2019 party founder and lynchpin Nora Bennis died, signalling the final demise of a party which had already begun to wind down.

== General election results ==
Election	Seats won	±	Position	First Pref votes	%	Leader
1997	0 / 166	Steady	▲8	19,077	1.1%	Nora Bennis
1998 Limerick East by-election	0 / 1	Steady	Steady	700	1.64%	Nora Bennis
2002	0 / 166	Steady	Steady	479	0.96%	Nora Bennis
2016	0 / 158	Steady	▼12	2,013	0.1%	Nora Bennis

== European election results ==
Election	Seats won	±	Position	First Pref votes	%	Leader
2014	0 / 11	Steady	Steady	13,569	0.8	Nora Bennis

== See also ==
- National Party (Ireland, 2016)
