= Candidates in the 2024 Irish general election =

This page lists the candidates in the 2024 Irish general election.

== Parties ==
There were 685 candidates in the 2024 general election. 248 of the candidates were women, making a record 36% of the total. There were 171 independent candidates. The five-seat Louth had the most candidates at 25, while the three-seat Wicklow–Wexford had the fewest at 10. Twenty registered political parties fielded candidates. Five parties contested in every constituency: Fianna Fáil, Fine Gael, Sinn Féin, Aontú and the Green Party.

Parties	Candidates	Constituencies
Fianna Fáil	82	43
Fine Gael	80	43
Sinn Féin	71	43
Aontú	43	43
Green	43	43
PBP–Solidarity	42 (Note: 33 candidates are from People Before Profit and 9 candidates are from Solidarity)	42
Labour	32	31
Independent Ireland	28	23
Social Democrats	26	25
The Irish People	21 (Note: Member party of National Alliance)	21
Irish Freedom Party	16	16
National Party	9	9
Liberty Republic	6	6
Centre Party	3	3
Independents 4 Change	3	3
Party for Animal Welfare	3	3
Rabharta	3	3
Ireland First	2	2
Right to Change	1	1
100% Redress	1	1
Independent	171 (Note: 2 candidates are members of National Alliance)	43

== Candidates ==
Elected candidates are shown in bold text.

*: Outgoing TD
#: Member of the 26th Seanad
‡: Previously a member of the Dáil or Seanad
§: Returned automatically without standing for election as outgoing Ceann Comhairle, in accordance with Article 16.6 of the Constitution of Ireland.

Constituency	Fianna Fáil	Sinn Féin	Fine Gael	Green	Labour	Social Democrats	PBP–Solidarity	Independent Ireland	Aontú	Independent	Others
Carlow–Kilkenny (5 seats)	**Peter "Chap" Cleere**; **John McGuinness**; **Jennifer Murnane O'Connor**	Áine Gladney Knox; **Natasha Newsome Drennan**	**Catherine Callaghan**; Michael Doyle; David Fitzgerald	Malcolm Noonan	Seán Ó hArgáin	Patricia Stephenson	Adrienne Wallace		Gary O'Neill	Tom Healy; Eugene McGuinness; Luke O'Connor (Note: Affiliated with the National Alliance.); John O'Leary; Noel G. Walsh	Orla Donohoe (IFP); David Egan (LR)
Cavan–Monaghan (5 seats)	Robbie Gallagher; **Brendan Smith**; **Niamh Smyth**	**Cathy Bennett**; **Matt Carthy**; Pauline Tully	Carmel Brady; **David Maxwell**; T.P. O'Reilly	Eddie O'Gara			Emma Hendrick	Shane P. O'Reilly	Sarah O'Reilly	Feargal Deery; Joseph Duffy; Lester Gordon; Jimmy Mee	Val Martin (IFP); Mark Moore (NP); Shane Mulligan (LR)
Clare (4 seats)	**Cathal Crowe**; **Timmy Dooley**; Rita McInerney	**Donna McGettigan**	Leonora Carey; **Joe Cooney**; Tom Nolan	Róisín Garvey		Hilary Tonge	Caitríona Ní Chatháin	Eddie Punch	June Dillon	Kevin Hassett; Amanda Major; Matthew Moroney; Paddy Murphy; Violet-Anne Wynne	Michael Leahy (IFP); Michael Loughrey (IP); Barry O'Donovan (Rabh)
Cork East (4 seats)	Deirdre O'Brien; **James O'Connor**	**Pat Buckley**; Mehdi Özçınar	**Noel McCarthy**; Mark Stanton	Clíona O'Halloran		**Liam Quaide**	Asch Ní Fhinn	Kathryn Bermingham; Catherine Lynch	Mona Stromsoe	Ross Cannon; Mary Linehan Foley; John O'Leary; William O'Leary; Frank Roche	James Peter O'Sullivan (IP)
Cork North-Central (5 seats)	Tony Fitzgerald; Sandra Murphy Kelleher; **Pádraig O'Sullivan**	**Thomas Gould**; Joe Lynch	**Colm Burke**; Imelda Daly; Garret Kelleher	Oliver Moran	**Eoghan Kenny**; John Maher	Susan Doyle; Ciarán McCarthy	Mick Barry	**Ken O'Flynn**	Finian Toomey	Martin Condon; John Donohoe; Rachel Hurley Roche (Note: Affiliated with the Workers' Party.); Joseph Gerard Peters	Derek Blighe (IF)
Cork North-West (3 seats)	**Aindrias Moynihan**; **Michael Moynihan**	Nicole Ryan	Michael Creed; **John Paul O'Shea**	Colette Finn			Joe Moore	Ellen Barry	Becky Kealy	John O'Leary; Walter Ryan-Purcell	
Cork South-Central (5 seats)	Margaret Kenneally; **Micheál Martin**; **Séamus McGrath**	Michelle Cowhey Shahid; **Donnchadh Ó Laoghaire**	**Jerry Buttimer**; Úna McCarthy; Shane O'Callaghan	Monica Oikeh	Laura Harmon	**Pádraig Rice**	Shane Laird	Veronica Houlihan; Valerie Ward	Anna Daly	Graham de Barra; Paudie Dineen; Tony Field; Mick Finn; John O'Leary	Lorna Bogue (Rabh); Ted Neville (NP)
Cork South-West (3 seats)	**Christopher O'Sullivan**	Claire O'Callaghan; Donnchadh Ó Seaghdha	Tim Lombard; Noel O'Donovan	Mary Ryder	Evie Nevin	**Holly Cairns**	Zoe Laplaud	**Michael Collins**	Mairead Ruane	Alan Coleman; John O'Leary	Deborah O'Driscoll (IP)
Donegal (5 seats)	**Pat "the Cope" Gallagher**; Claudia Kennedy; **Charlie McConalogue**	**Pearse Doherty**; Noel Jordan; **Pádraig Mac Lochlainn**	Nikki Bradley; John McNulty	Nuala Carr			Carol Gallagher		Mary T. Sweeney	Vincent J. Bradley; Niall McConnell; Arthur McGuinness Gerry McKeever; Frank O'Donnell; Thomas Pringle	Eamon McGee (IFP); Kim McMenamin (IP); **Charles Ward** (100%R)
Dublin Bay North (5 seats)	**Tom Brabazon**; Deirdre Heney	**Denise Mitchell**; Mícheál Mac Donncha	**Naoise Ó Muirí**; Aoibhinn Tormey	David Healy	Shane Folan	**Cian O'Callaghan**	Bernard Mulvany		James Morris	Michael Burke; Kevin Coyle; Stephen Doyle; Brian Garrigan; **Barry Heneghan**; John Lyons; Jamie McGlue; Diarmaid Ó Conoráin	Paul Fitzsimons (IFP)
Dublin Bay South (4 seats)	**Jim O'Callaghan**	Chris Andrews	Emma Blain; **James Geoghegan**	Hazel Chu	**Ivana Bacik**	**Eoin Hayes**	Brigid Purcell		Alan Healy	Nick Delehanty; Peter Dooley; Mannix Flynn; David Hennessy; John Keigher; Kate O'Connell; Daniel Pocock	Lauralee Doyle (IP)
Dublin Central (4 seats)	Mary Fitzpatrick	Janice Boylan; **Mary Lou McDonald**	**Paschal Donohoe**	Neasa Hourigan	**Marie Sherlock**	**Gary Gannon**	Eoghan Ó Ceannabháin		Ian Noel Smyth	Gerry Hutch; Malachy Steenson	Clare Daly (I4C); Andrew Kelly (CP)
Dublin Fingal East (3 seats)	Manju Devi; **Darragh O'Brien**	**Ann Graves**	Alan Farrell	Ian Carey	**Duncan Smith**	Joan Hopkins	Bryn Edwards		Margaret McGovern	Tony Donnelly; Darren Kelly; Fergal O Connell	Victoria Byrne (IFP); Ben Gilroy (LR); Dean Mulligan (I4C)
Dublin Fingal West (3 seats)	Lorraine Clifford-Lee	**Louise O'Reilly**	**Grace Boland**	Joe O'Brien	**Robert O'Donoghue**		Ollie Power		Robbie Loughlin	Tony Murphy; Oghenetano John Uwhumiakpor	Ben Gilroy (LR); John Oakes (IFP); Mark Parsons (IP)
Dublin Mid-West (5 seats)	**Shane Moynihan**; Lynda Prendergast	**Eoin Ó Broin** (Note: The sitting Sinn Féin TD and the Social Democrats councillor running in this constituency are both named Eoin Ó Broin.); **Mark Ward**	Vicki Casserly; **Emer Higgins**	Karla Doran	Francis Timmons	Eoin Ó Broin	Gino Kenny	Linda de Courcy	Colm Quinn	**Paul Gogarty**; Alan Hayes; Seanan Ó Coistín	Robert Coyle (IP); Glen Moore (IFP)
Dublin North-West (3 seats)	**Paul McAuliffe**	Cathleen Carney Boud; **Dessie Ellis**	Noel Rock	Caroline Conroy	John Nisbet	**Rory Hearne**	Conor Reddy		Edward McManus	Diarmuid Mac Dubhghlais; Gavin Pepper	Ian Croft (CP); Stephen Redmond (NP)
Dublin Rathdown (4 seats)	**Shay Brennan**; Elaine Dunne	Shaun Tracey	**Maeve O'Connell**; **Neale Richmond**	Catherine Martin	Lettie McCarthy	**Sinéad Gibney**	Síomha Ní Aonghusa		Liam Coughlan	Kevin Daly; Michael Fleming; Conor Murphy; Alan Shatter	Garrett McCafferty (NP)
Dublin South-Central (4 seats)	**Catherine Ardagh**	**Máire Devine**; Daithí Doolan; **Aengus Ó Snodaigh**	Mary Seery Kearney	Patrick Costello	Darragh Moriarty	**Jen Cummins**	Hazel De Nortúin	Rebecca Hendrick; Philip Sutcliffe Snr (Note: Sutcliffe resigned from Independent Ireland shortly.)	Aisling Considine	Richard Murray; Dolores Webster	Jina Ahearne (IP); Joan Collins (RTC); John Paul Murphy (Rabh); Barry Ward (IFP)
Dublin South-West (5 seats)	Teresa Costello; **John Lahart**	**Seán Crowe**; Niamh Whelan	Sarah Barnes; **Colm Brophy**	Francis Noel Duffy	**Ciarán Ahern**	Ross O'Mullane	**Paul Murphy**		Saoirse Ní Chónaráin	Alan Edge; Niall Hade; Paddy Holohan; Colm O'Keeffe	Yan Mac Oireachtaigh (NP)
Dublin West (5 seats)	**Jack Chambers**; Lorna Nolan	**Paul Donnelly**; Breda Hanaphy	**Emer Currie**	**Roderic O'Gorman**	John Walsh	Ellen Murphy	**Ruth Coppinger**		Ellen Troy	Umar Al-Qadri; Susanne Delaney; Tania Doyle; Natalie Treacy	Patrick Quinlan (NP)
Dún Laoghaire (4 seats)	**Cormac Devlin**	Shane O'Brien	**Jennifer Carroll MacNeill**; **Barry Ward**	Ossian Smyth	Martha Fanning	Hugo Mills	**Richard Boyd Barrett**		Mairéad Tóibín	Michael O'Doherty	Cathy Lynch (IP)
Galway East (4 seats)	**Albert Dolan**; Anne Rabbitte	**Louis O'Hara**	Clodagh Higgins; Niamh Madden; **Peter Roche**	Eoin Madden			Conor Burke	Declan Geraghty	Luke Silke	**Seán Canney**; Fergal Landy; Paul Madden	David O'Reilly (IP)
Galway West (5 seats)	**John Connolly**; Gráinne Seoige	**Mairéad Farrell**	Seán Kyne; **Hildegarde Naughton**	Pauline O'Reilly	Helen Ogbu	Eibhlín Seoighthe	Maisie McMaster	Noel Thomas	Pádraig Lenihan	**Catherine Connolly**; Mike Cubbard; Patrick Feeney; **Noel Grealish**	AJ Cahill (IP); Doran McMahon (IFP)
Kerry (5 seats)	**Michael Cahill**; **Norma Foley**; Linda Gordon-Kelleher	**Pa Daly**; Stephanie O'Shea	Billy O'Shea	Cleo Murphy	Mike Kennedy		Cian Prendiville	Tom McEllistrim	Catherina O'Sullivan	Mary Fitzgibbon; **Danny Healy-Rae**; **Michael Healy-Rae**; Michelle Keane; John O'Leary	Brandon Begley (IFP)
Kildare North (5 seats)	**James Lawless**; **Naoise Ó Cearúil**	**Réada Cronin**; Caroline Hogan	Bernard Durkan; **Joe Neville**; Evie Sammon	Vincent P. Martin	Angela Feeney	**Aidan Farrelly**	Leah Whelan		Una O'Connor	Bill Clear	Avril Corcoran (IP); Sean Gill (CP); Gerry Waters (IFP)
Kildare South (4 seats)	**Seán Ó Fearghaíl**; Fiona O'Loughlin	**Shónagh Ní Raghallaigh**	**Martin Heydon**	Monaa K. Sood	**Mark Wall**	Chris Pender	Rob Cosgrave	William Carton; Edel Doran	Melissa Byrne	Cathal Berry; Tom McDonnell; Leanne O'Neill; Patricia Ryan	Anthony Casey (IFP)
Laois (3 seats)	**Seán Fleming**; Austin Stack	Maria McCormack	**William Aird**	Rosie Palmer			Ken Mooney		Mary Hand	Pauline Flanagan; Jason Lynch; Aisling Moran; Elaine Mullally; **Brian Stanley**	
Limerick City (4 seats)	**Willie O'Dea**; Dee Ryan	Paul Gavan; **Maurice Quinlivan**	Maria Byrne; **Kieran O'Donnell**	Brian Leddin	**Conor Sheehan**	Elisa O'Donovan	Ruairí Fahy	Esther Ahern	Sarah Beasley	Melanie Cleary; Frankie Daly; Michelle Hayes; Dean Lillis	Dean Quinn (IP)
Limerick County (3 seats)	Bridie Collins; **Niall Collins**	Joanne Collins	**Patrick O'Donovan**; Noreen Stokes	Rob O'Donnell			Laura Fahey	**Richard O'Donoghue**	Michael Ryan	Jim Barrett; Richie Crehan; April Sheehan Corkery	Donna O'Loughlin (IFP); Lorraine O'Sullivan (IP); Gerben Uunk (PAW)
Longford–Westmeath (5 seats)	Dympna Cunniffe; Joe Flaherty; **Robert Troy**	Barry Campion; **Sorca Clarke**	**Peter Burke**; Tanya Cannon; **Micheál Carrigy**	Carol Okeke	Fidelma Bennett		Dave Smyth	Paul Hogan	Laura O'Neill	Paul Bradley; Louise Heavin; Donal Jackson; Charlotte Keenan; **Kevin "Boxer" Moran**; Gerry Warnock	Margaret Alacoque Maguire (IF)
Louth (5 seats)	Alison Comyn; **Erin McGreehan**	**Joanna Byrne**; **Ruairí Ó Murchú**; Antóin Watters	**Paula Butterly**; John McGahon	Marianne Butler	**Ged Nash**	Niall McCreanor	James Renaghan	Ryan McKeown	Michael O'Dowd	David Bradley; David Brennan; Kevin Callan; Thomas Clare; David Carroll; Albert David Byrne; Alan Fagan; Peter-James Nugent; Tracy O'Hanlon	Hermann Kelly (IFP); Derek McElearney (IP)
Mayo (5 seats)	**Dara Calleary**; Lisa Chambers	**Rose Conway-Walsh**; Gerry Murray	**Alan Dillon**; Mark Duffy; Martina Jennings; **Keira Keogh**	Mícheál Boxty Ó Conaill			Joe Daly	Chris Maxwell	**Paul Lawless**	Sean Forkin; Stephen Kerr; Gerry Loftus; Patsy O'Brien	
Meath East (4 seats)	**Thomas Byrne**; Caroline O'Reilly	**Darren O'Rourke**; Maria White	**Helen McEntee**; Sharon Tolan	Ruadháin Bonham	Eilish Balfe		Clara McCormack		Emer Tóibín	Charles Bobbett; Joseph Bonner; Sivakumar Murugadoss; **Gillian Toole**; Raymond Westlake	Carolyn Fahy (PAW); Jean Murray (NP); Barbara Reid (LR)
Meath West (3 seats)	**Aisling Dempsey**	**Johnny Guirke**	Linda Nelson Murray	Séamus McMenamin	Sandy Gallagher	Ronan Moore	Finbar Lynch		**Peadar Tóibín**	Noel French; Damien Reilly	Ben Gilroy (LR); Ian McGauley (IP)
Offaly (3 seats)	**Tony McCormack**; Claire Murray	Aoife Masterson	**John Clendennen**	Pippa Hackett			Keishia Taylor	Fergus McDonnell	Maureen Ward	Mike Boylan; Eddie Fitzpatrick; **Carol Nolan**	
Roscommon–Galway (3 seats)	**Martin Daly**	**Claire Kerrane**	Dympna Daly Finn; Aisling Dolan	Martina O'Connor			Andrew Mannion	**Michael Fitzmaurice**	Cormac Ó Corcoráin	Vincent Beirne; Eugene Murphy	Alan Sweeney (IP)
Sligo–Leitrim (4 seats)	Edel McSharry; Paddy O'Rourke; **Eamon Scanlon**	**Martin Kenny**; Chris MacManus	**Frank Feighan**	Bláithín Gallagher	Nessa Cosgrove		Gino O'Boyle	Michael Clarke; Caroline Corcoran	Graham Monaghan	Marie Casserly; Des Guckian; **Marian Harkin**	Molly Candon (PAW); Michael Kelly (IFP)
Tipperary North (3 seats)	**Ryan O'Meara**; Michael Smith	Evan Barry; Dan Harty	Phyll Bugler	Iva Pocock	**Alan Kelly**		Diana O'Dwyer		Francis O'Toole	**Michael Lowry**; Liam Minehan; Justin Phelan; Jim Ryan	Peter Madden (IP)
Tipperary South (3 seats)	Imelda Goldsboro	Martin Browne	**Michael Murphy**	Myriam Madigan	Michael Brennan			Nadaline Webster	Rosemary McGlone	Bill Fitzgerald; **Séamus Healy** (Note: Affiliated with Workers and Unemployed Action.); **Mattie McGrath**; John O'Heney	John McGrath (NP)
Waterford (4 seats)	**Mary Butler**	**David Cullinane**; **Conor D. McGuinness**	**John Cummins**	Marc Ó Cathasaigh	Sadhbh O'Neill	Mary Roche	Patrick Curtin		Ronan Cleary	Frank Conway; Aaron Joyce; Killian Mangan; Mark O'Neill; Melissa O'Neill; Matt Shanahan	John D. Walsh (IP)
Wexford (4 seats)	**James Browne**; Michelle O'Neill	**Johnny Mythen**	Cathal Byrne; Bridín Murphy	Peadar McDonald	**George Lawlor**		Martina Stafford		Jim Codd	**Verona Murphy**; Jackser Owens; Michael Sheehan	Jason Murphy (NP); Stephen Power (IP); Mick Wallace (I4C)
Wicklow (4 seats)	Stephen Donnelly	**John Brady**	**Simon Harris**; **Edward Timmins**	Steven Matthews	Paul O'Brien	**Jennifer Whitmore**	Kellie McConnell		Ciarán Hogan	Joe Behan; Rob Carry; Shay Cullen; Philip Dwyer; Charlie Keddy; Sean O'Leary; Gerry O'Neill; Dominic Plant	Michaela Keddy (IP)
Wicklow–Wexford (3 seats)	**Malcolm Byrne**; Pat Kennedy	**Fionntán O Súillebháin**	**Brian Brennan**	Ann Walsh			Aislinn O'Keeffe	Frances Lawlor	Sinéad Boland	Peir Leonard; Ilsa-Maria Nolan	
