= 2024 Cork City Council election =

Part of the 2024 Irish local elections

- 7 June 2024

All 31 seats on Cork City Council 16 seats needed for a majority
	First party	Second party	Third party
Party	Fianna Fáil	Fine Gael	Sinn Féin
Last election	8	7	4
Seats before	7	7	4
Seats won	9	5	4
Seat change	▲2	▼2	Steady
	Fourth party	Fifth party	Sixth party
Party	Green	Labour	Social Democrats
Last election	4	1	0
Seats before	3	1	0
Seats won	3	3	1
Seat change	Steady	▲2	▲1
	Seventh party	Eighth party	Ninth party
Party	Independent Ireland	PBP–Solidarity	Rabharta
Last election	0	1	0
Seats before	1	1	1
Seats won	1	1	0
Seat change	Steady	Steady	▼1
- Results by Local Electoral Area

An election to all 31 seats on Cork City Council was held on 7 June 2024 as part of the 2024 Irish local elections. Cork is divided into 5 local electoral areas (LEAs) to elect councillors for a five-year term of office on the electoral system of proportional representation by means of the single transferable vote (PR-STV).

== Results by party ==
Party	First-preference votes			Seats				
Party	Votes	% FPv	Swing (pp)	Cand.	2019	Out.	Elected 2024	Change
Fianna Fáil	16,648	24.28	▼0.24	12	8	7	9	▲1
Fine Gael	12,780	18.64	▼1.95	10	7	7	5	▼2
Sinn Féin	9,680	14.12	▲2.09	12	4	4	4	Steady
Labour	5,125	7.48	▲1.86	5	1	1	3	▲2
Green	4,117	6.01	▼4.24	5	4	3	3	▼1
Social Democrats	3,695	5.39	▲2.55	5	0	0	1	▲1
Independent Ireland	3,334	4.86	New	2	0	New	1	New
Solidarity	1,356	1.98	▼0.36	2	1	1	1	Steady
Aontú	1,815	2.65	▲0.28	3	0	0	0	Steady
The Irish People	1,419	2.07	New	3	New	0	0	New
Rabharta	523	0.76	New	1	0	1	0	▼1
Ireland First	330	0.48	New	1	New	0	0	New
People Before Profit	226	0.33	▼0.50	1	0	0	0	Steady
Independent	6,400	9.34	▼5.34	14	5	5	4	▼1
Total Valid	68,554	98.65						
Spoilt votes	938	1.35						
Total	69,492	100.00	—	76	30	29	31	Steady
Registered voters/Turnout	158,902	43.73						

== Results by local electoral area ==
*: Outgoing councillor elected in 2019.
†: Outgoing councillor coopted subsequent to the 2019 election.

=== Cork City North East ===
Cork City North East: 6 Seats
Party	Candidate	FPv%	Count										
Party	Candidate	FPv%	1	2	3	4	5	6	7	8	9	10	11
Independent Ireland	Ken O'Flynn	22.58	3,134										
Labour	John Maher	14.44	2,005										
Fianna Fáil	Margaret McDonnell	9.93	1,379	1,489	1,500	1,516	1,543	1,548	1,804	1,823	2,134		
Fine Gael	Joe Kavanagh	9.75	1,353	1,573	1,585	1,610	1,626	1,633	1,705	1,733	2,180		
Independent	Ted Tynan	6.55	909	1,118	1,207	1,248	1,284	1,432	1,476	1,699	1,734	1,768	1,803
Green	Oliver Moran	6.53	906	947	959	1,068	1,083	1,094	1,132	1,336	1,436	1,585	1,668
Fine Gael	Imelda Daly	6.31	876	925	928	955	969	975	1,017	1,048			
Sinn Féin	Christa Daley	6.07	843	934	947	991	1,290	1,326	1,344	1,546	1,574	1,587	1,607
Solidarity	Edith Busteed	4.49	623	666	685	809	824	849	862				
Fianna Fáil	Shane Ryan	3.23	448	543	550	559	574	579					
Social Democrats	Sinéad Halpin	3.00	416	442	454								
Sinn Féin	Mandy O'Leary-Hegarty	2.93	407	474	485	495							
The Irish People	Anita Ward	2.50	347	461	515	521	531						
Independent	Martin Condon	1.42	197	265									
Independent	Tamasin MacCarthy Morrogh	0.27	38	55									
Electorate: 32,628 Valid: 13,881 Spoilt: 190 Quota: 1,984 Turnout: 14,071 (43.13%)

=== Cork City North West ===
Cork City North West: 6 Seats
Party	Candidate	FPv%	Count									
Party	Candidate	FPv%	1	2	3	4	5	6	7	8	9	10
Fianna Fáil	Tony Fitzgerald	15.73	1,930									
Fine Gael	Damian Boylan	15.26	1,872									
Fianna Fáil	John Sheehan	12.82	1,573	1,655	1,727	1,780						
Sinn Féin	Kenneth Collins	10.42	1,279	1,298	1,303	1,313	1,332	1,373	1,374	1,424	1,463	1,769
Sinn Féin	Michelle Gould	9.18	1,126	1,147	1,153	1,172	1,223	1,278	1,279	1,321	1,411	1,773
Sinn Féin	Mick Nugent	6.02	739	757	759	772	788	826	827	871	908	
Solidarity	Brian McCarthy	5.97	733	740	743	772	917	978	981	1,055	1,291	1,366
The Irish People	Ross Lahive	5.90	724	728	730	742	748	883	885	1,104	1,130	1,173
Aontú	Finian Twomey	4.65	570	575	580	590	609	700	702			
Independent	Stephen Morrissey	4.36	535	541	542	560	574					
Green	Louise Jordan	3.75	460	465	476	546	692	704	721	760		
Social Democrats	Saoirse Mackin	3.19	391	394	398	468						
Labour	James Joy	2.75	337	344	352							
Electorate: 30,018 Valid: 12,269 Spoilt: 257 Quota: 1,753 Turnout: 12,526 (41.73%)

=== Cork City South Central ===
Cork City South Central: 6 Seats
Party	Candidate	FPv%	Count									
Party	Candidate	FPv%	1	2	3	4	5	6	7	8	9	10
Fine Gael	Shane O'Callaghan	17.49	1,870									
Fianna Fáil	Seán Martin	13.11	1,402	1,489	1,490	1,502	1,503	1,508	1,537			
Social Democrats	Pádraig Rice	10.11	1,081	1,103	1,105	1,114	1,216	1,228	1,355	1,397	1,447	1,555
Green	Dan Boyle	8.26	883	918	921	929	942	945	1,025	1,073	1,097	1,281
Independent	Paudie Dineen	8.22	879	895	897	931	935	1,003	1,015	1,152	1,197	1,311
Sinn Féin	Fiona Kerins	7.91	846	853	854	865	887	896	927	979	1,447	1,491
Independent	William O'Brien	7.90	845	854	854	875	892	981	997	1,088	1,134	1,176
Fianna Fáil	David Boyle	5.84	624	732	735	745	746	749	765	827	858	
Sinn Féin	Luke McGrath	5.76	616	628	629	643	666	689	701	734		
Aontú	Anna Daly	4.93	527	539	540	557	558	637	653			
Labour	Lekha Margassery	3.16	338	352	358	362	396	398				
Ireland First	Tommy Murphy	3.09	330	334	335	373	376					
People Before Profit	Shane Laird	2.11	226	227	228	231						
Independent Ireland	Joe Harris	1.87	200	212	214							
Independent	Joel Rajesh	0.23	25	28								
Electorate: 26,020 Valid: 10,692 Spoilt: 108 Quota: 1,528 Turnout: 10,800 (41.51%)

=== Cork City South East ===
Cork City South East: 6 Seats
Party	Candidate	FPv%	Count											
Party	Candidate	FPv%	1	2	3	4	5	6	7	8	9	10	11	12
Fianna Fáil	Terry Shannon	13.77%	2,157	2,160	2,163	2,169	2,188	2,201	2,214	2,302				
Fianna Fáil	Mary Rose Desmond	12.11%	1,897	1,898	1,900	1,904	1,909	1,932	1,967	2,100	2,176	2,191	2,196	2,269
Independent	Kieran McCarthy	11.18%	1,752	1,771	1,791	1,818	1,906	1,939	2,046	2,155	2,302			
Fine Gael	Des Cahill	11.16%	1,748	1,750	1,754	1,757	1,764	1,775	1,814	1,975	2,015	2,033	2,040	2,119
Labour	Peter Horgan	7.69%	1,205	1,209	1,215	1,221	1,228	1,248	1,275	1,321	1,547	1,556	1,575	1,814
Fine Gael	Deirdre Forde	7.58%	1,187	1,189	1,191	1,195	1,198	1,213	1,230	1,478	1,528	1,539	1,543	1,592
Green	Honore Kamegni	7.57%	1,186	1,189	1,200	1,207	1,213	1,238	1,331	1,400	1,706	1,715	1,731	1,934
Fine Gael	Barry O'Brien	5.90%	924	925	925	928	937	951	968					
Sinn Féin	Chris O'Leary	5.36%	840	840	852	869	894	1,274	1,320	1,339	1,434	1,446	1,449	
Social Democrats	Susan Doyle	5.10%	799	799	816	820	830	863	1,061	1,084				
Sinn Féin	Michelle Cowhey Shahid	3.95%	619	620	628	634	643							
Rabharta	Lorna Bogue	3.34%	523	532	594	629	688	730						
The Irish People	Michael O'Riordan	2.22%	348	363	367	456								
Independent	Shannon Wright	1.49%	234	243	252									
Independent	Rachel Hurley Roche	1.02%	160	168										
Independent	Tony Field	0.55%	86											
Electorate: 34,109 Valid: 15,665 Spoilt: 183 Quota: 2,238 Turnout: 15,848 (46.46%)

=== Cork City South West ===
Cork City South West: 7 Seats
Party	Candidate	FPv%	Count													
Party	Candidate	FPv%	1	2	3	4	5	6	7	8	9	10	11	12	13	14
Fianna Fáil	Colm Kelleher	10.88%	1,746	1,748	1,759	1,770	1,775	1,902	1,919	1,967	1,970	2,174				
Fianna Fáil	Fergal Dennehy	10.67%	1,713	1,724	1,758	1,826	1,870	1,943	1,994	2,051						
Fine Gael	Garret Kelleher	9.72%	1,559	1,566	1,575	1,766	1,766	1,823	1,896	1,942	1,946	2,373				
Labour	Laura Harmon	7.73%	1,240	1,260	1,290	1,346	1,377	1,435	1,648	1,689	1,692	1,735	1,789	1,816	1,951	1,986
Fianna Fáil	Terry Coleman	7.33%	1,176	1,184	1,196	1,267	1,274	1,334	1,373	1,404	1,415	1,456	1,573	1,595	1,654	1,663
Independent	Albert Deasy	7.10%	1,137	1,166	1,356	1,380	1,395	1,410	1,431	1,688	1,704	1,728	1,756	1,769	1,830	1,860
Sinn Féin	Joe Lynch	6.40%	1,027	1,034	1,046	1,049	1,154	1,169	1,192	1,223	1,224	1,293	1,309	1,337	2,120	
Social Democrats	Ciarán McCarthy	6.28%	1,008	1,030	1,048	1,058	1,075	1,110	1,274	1,309	1,311	1,385	1,431	1,459	1,548	1,588
Fine Gael	Gary O'Brien	5.35%	858	863	870	917	922	970	1,003	1,035	1,035					
Sinn Féin	Orla O'Leary	4.90%	787	800	823	833	1,177	1,188	1,224	1,261	1,262	1,290	1,297	1,306		
Aontú	Joanne Murphy	4.47%	718	729	762	765	770	787	811							
Green	Colette Finn	4.25%	682	692	698	723	731	759								
Fianna Fáil	Olga Shevchenko	3.76%	603	609	613	623	625									
Sinn Féin	Trevor McCarthy	3.43%	551	569	615	620										
Fine Gael	Andrea Christopher-Rea	3.32%	533	537	544											
Independent	Thomas Kiely	2.92%	469	519												
Independent	Aran MacDonnchadha	1.50%	240													
Electorate: 36,127 Valid: 16,047 Spoilt: 200 Quota: 2,006 Turnout: 16,247 (44.97%)

== Changes ==
=== Co-options ===
Party	Outgoing	LEA	Reason	Date	Co-optee
Independent Ireland	Ken O'Flynn	Cork City North East	Elected to 34th Dáil at the 2024 general election	17 December 2024	Noel O'Flynn
Social Democrats	Pádraig Rice	Cork City South Central	Elected to 34th Dáil at the 2024 general election	17 December 2024	Niamh O'Connor
Labour	Laura Harmon	Cork City South West	Elected to 27th Seanad at the 2025 Seanad election	10 March 2025	Ciara O'Connor
Fine Gael	Garret Kelleher	Cork City South West	Elected to 27th Seanad at the 2025 Seanad election	10 March 2025	Gary O'Brien
