= Politics of the Republic of Ireland =

- Coat of arms
- Polity type: Unitary parliamentary democratic Republic
- Constitution: Constitution of Ireland

Legislative branch
- Name: Oireachtas
- Type: Bicameral
- Meeting place: Leinster House
- Upper house
- Name: Seanad Éireann
- Presiding officer: Mark Daly, Cathaoirleach
- Appointer: Indirect Election
- Lower house
- Name: Dáil Éireann
- Presiding officer: Verona Murphy, Ceann Comhairle
- Appointer: Election

Executive branch
- Head of state
- Title: President of Ireland
- Currently: Catherine Connolly
- Appointer: Election
- Head of government
- Title: Taoiseach
- Currently: Micheál Martin
- Appointer: President
- Cabinet
- Name: Government of Ireland
- Current cabinet: 35th government
- Leader: Taoiseach
- Deputy leader: Tánaiste
- Appointer: Election by Oireachtas
- Headquarters: Government Buildings
- Ministries: 18

Judicial branch
- Name: Judiciary
- Supreme Court
- Chief judge: Donal O'Donnell
- Seat: Four Courts, Dublin
- Court of Appeal
- Chief judge: Caroline Costello

Ireland is a parliamentary, representative democratic republic and a member state of the European Union. While the head of state is the popularly elected President of Ireland, it is a largely ceremonial position, with real political power being vested in the Taoiseach, who is nominated by the Dáil and is the head of the government.

Executive power is exercised by the government, which consists of no more than 15 cabinet ministers, inclusive of the Taoiseach and Tánaiste (the deputy head of government). Legislative power is vested in the Oireachtas, the bicameral national parliament, which consists of Dáil Éireann, Seanad Éireann and the President of Ireland. The judiciary is independent of the executive and the legislature. The head of the judiciary is the Chief Justice, who presides over the Supreme Court.

Ireland has a multi-party system. Fianna Fáil and Fine Gael, historically opposed and competing entities, which both occupy the traditional centre ground, trace their roots to the opposing sides of the Irish Civil War. All governments since 1932 have been led by one or the other party, with Fianna Fáil having had sufficient support at many elections to govern alone. Fluctuations in seat levels allowed changes in governments through different coalitions. From 1932 to 2011, the parties were stable in their support, with Fianna Fáil the largest at each election, Fine Gael the second largest, and on all but two occasions, the Labour Party the third party. The last three elections, however, have each had more volatile results. At the 2011 election, the largest parties in order were Fine Gael, Labour and Fianna Fáil; at the 2016 election, the largest parties in order were Fine Gael, Fianna Fáil and Sinn Féin; and at the 2020 election, the largest parties were Fianna Fáil first in seats (second in votes), Sinn Féin second in seats (first in votes), and then Fine Gael. The result was historically good for Sinn Féin.

In June 2020, leader of Fianna Fáil, Micheál Martin, became the new Taoiseach (head of government). He formed a historic three-party coalition consisting of Fianna Fáil, Fine Gael and the Green Party. It was the first time in history that Fianna Fáil and Fine Gael were in the same government. The previous Taoiseach and leader of Fine Gael, Leo Varadkar, became the Tánaiste (deputy head of government). Martin led the country as Taoiseach until 17 December 2022, when he changed posts with Varadkar.

The Economist Intelligence Unit rated Ireland a "full democracy" in 2022. According to the V-Dem Democracy indices, Ireland was the 3rd most electoral democratic country in the world in 2024.

== Constitution ==
The state operates under the Constitution of Ireland (Irish: Bunreacht na hÉireann) which was adopted in 1937 by means of a plebiscite. The constitution falls within the liberal democratic tradition. It defines the organs of government and guarantees certain fundamental rights. The Constitution can only be amended by means of a referendum. Important constitutional referendums have concerned issues such as abortion, the status of the Catholic Church, divorce, the European Union and same-sex marriage.

== President ==
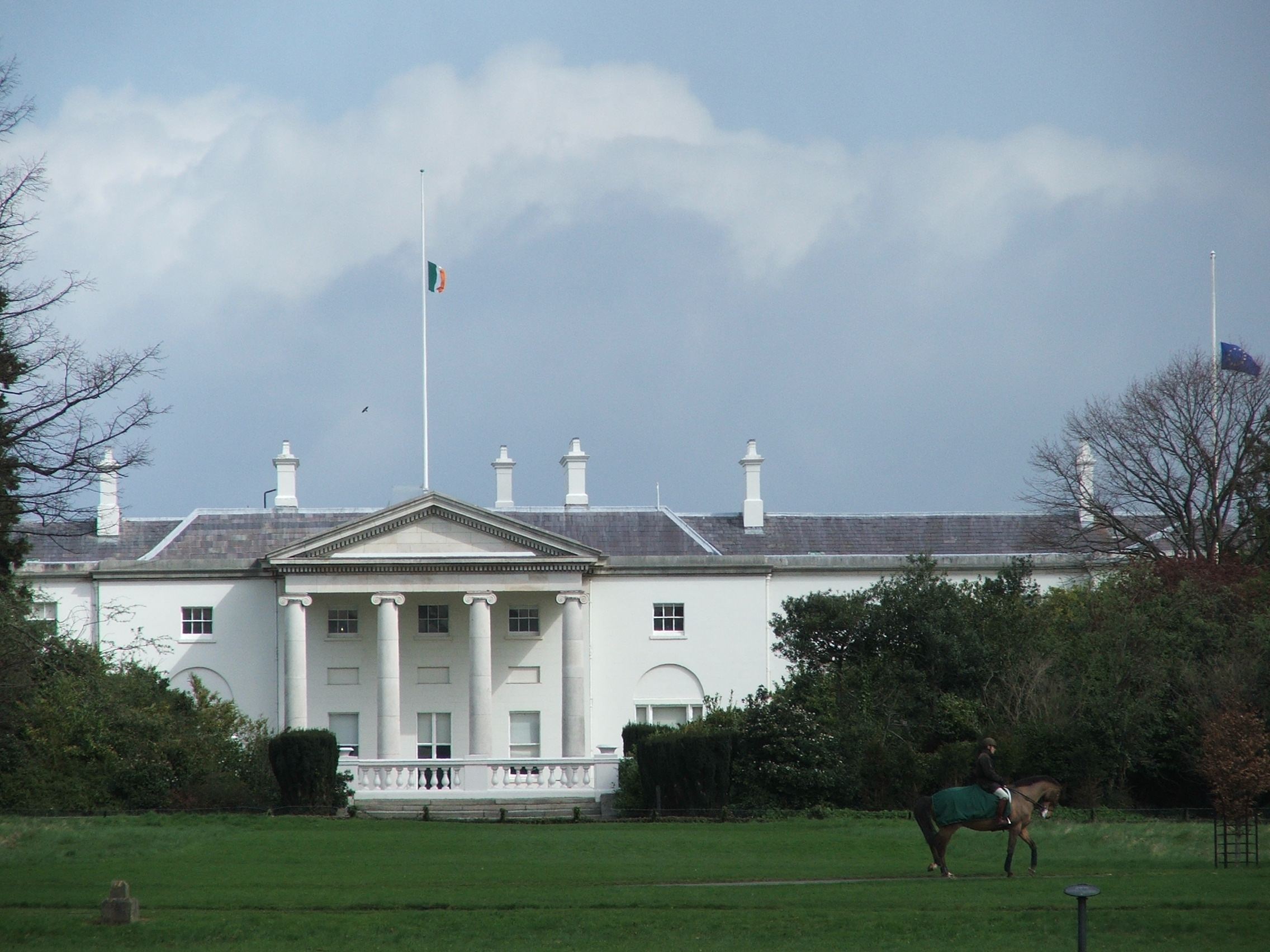
Áras an Uachtaráin in Dublin, official residence of the President of Ireland

The head of state is the President of Ireland. In keeping with the state's parliamentary system of government, the President exercises a mainly ceremonial role but does possess certain specific powers. The presidency is open to all Irish citizens who are at least 35. They are directly elected by secret ballot under the alternative vote. A candidate may be nominated for election as president by no fewer than 20 members of the Oireachtas or by four or more of Ireland's 31 County and City Councils. A retiring President may nominate themselves as a candidate for re-election. If only one valid candidate is nominated for election, for example if there is consensus among the political parties to nominate a single candidate, it is unnecessary to proceed to a ballot and that candidate is deemed elected. The President is elected to a seven-year term of office and no person may serve more than two terms.

In carrying out certain of their constitutional functions, the President is aided by the Council of State. There is no vice-president in Ireland. If for any reason the President is unable to carry out their functions, or if the Office of President is vacant, the duties of the President are carried out by the Presidential Commission.

The President may not veto bills passed by the Oireachtas but may, after consultation with the Council of State, refer them to the Supreme Court of Ireland for a ruling on whether they comply with the constitution. The President may refuse a request of the Taoiseach for a dissolution of Dáil Éireann, although no request for a dissolution has ever been refused.

== Legislative branch ==
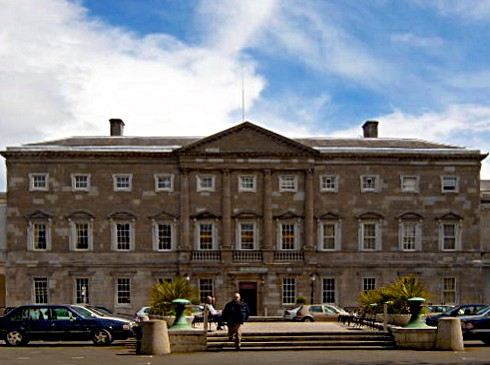
Leinster House in Dublin, seat of the houses of the Oireachtas

Article 15 of the Constitution of Ireland established the Oireachtas as the national parliament of Ireland. The Oireachtas consists of the President of Ireland and two elected houses: Dáil Éireann (the House of Representatives) and Seanad Éireann (the Senate). As the Oireachtas also consists of the President, the title of the two law-making houses is the Houses of the Oireachtas. The Dáil is by far the dominant house of the legislature.

=== Dáil Éireann ===
Members of the Dáil are directly elected at least once in every five years under the single transferable vote form of proportional representation from multi-seat constituencies. Membership of the house is open to all Irish citizens who are at least 21 and permanently resident in the State. The electorate consists of all Irish and British citizens resident in Ireland over the age of 18. Members of the Dáil are known as Teachta Dála or TDs. As of 2025, there are 174 TDs, of which one, the Ceann Comhairle (presiding officer), is automatically returned at an election. The Taoiseach, Tánaiste and the Minister for Finance must be members of the Dáil. The Dáil is the only House which can introduce and amend money bills (i.e. financial and tax legislation). Since the early 1980s, no single party has had a majority in Dáil Éireann, so that coalition governments have been the norm.

=== Seanad Éireann ===
The Seanad is a largely advisory body. It consists of sixty members called Senators. An election for the Seanad must take place no later than 90 days after a general election for the members of the Dáil. Eleven Senators are nominated by the Taoiseach while a further six are elected by certain national universities. The remaining 43 are elected from special vocational panels of candidates, the electorate for which consists of the 60 members of the outgoing Senate, the 174 TDs of the incoming Dáil and the 949 elected members of 31 local authorities. The Seanad has the power to delay legislative proposals and is allowed 90 days to consider and amend bills sent to it by the Dáil (excluding money bills). The Seanad is only allowed 21 days to consider money bills sent to it by the Dáil. The Seanad cannot amend money bills but can make recommendations to the Dáil on such bills. No more than two members of a government may be members of the Seanad, and only twice since 1937 have members of the Seanad been appointed to government.

== Executive branch ==
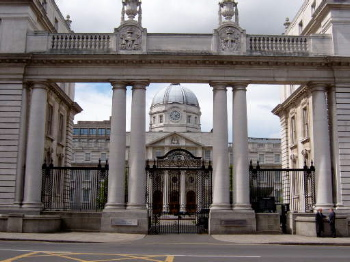
Government Buildings in Dublin

Executive authority is exercised by a cabinet known simply as the Government. Article 28 of the Constitution states that the Government may consist of no less than seven and no more than fifteen members, namely the Taoiseach (prime minister), the Tánaiste (deputy prime minister) and up to thirteen other ministers. The Minister for Finance is the only other position named in the Constitution. The Taoiseach is appointed by the President, after being nominated by Dáil Éireann. The remaining ministers are nominated by the Taoiseach and appointed by the President following their approval by the Dáil. The Government must enjoy the confidence of Dáil Éireann and, in the event that they cease to enjoy the support of the lower house, the Taoiseach must either resign or request the President to dissolve the Dáil, in which case a general election follows.

== Judicial branch ==
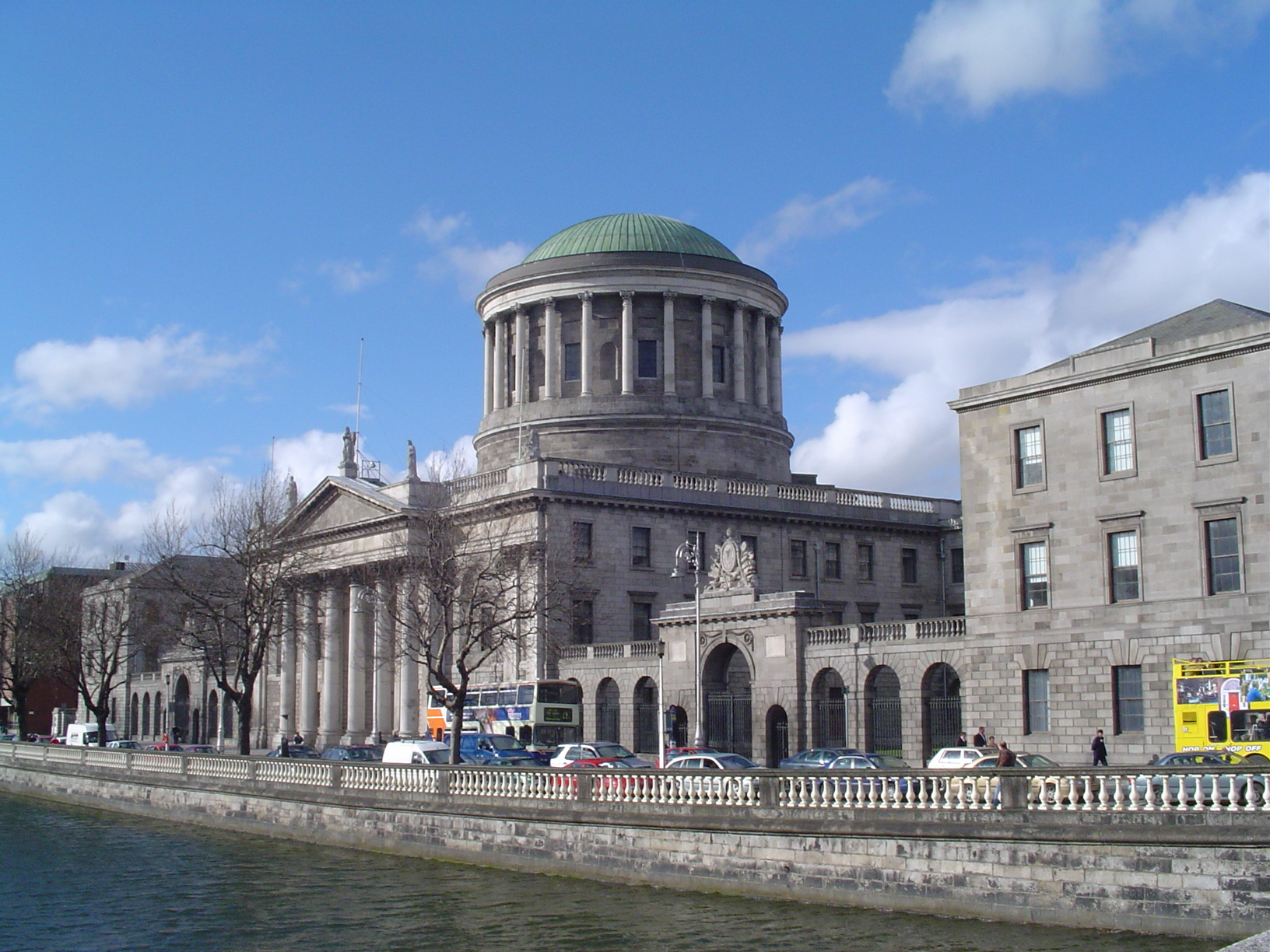
The Four Courts in Dublin

Ireland is a common law jurisdiction. The judiciary consists of the Supreme Court, the Court of Appeal and the High Court established by the Constitution and other lower courts established by statute law. Judges are appointed by the President after being nominated by the Government and can be removed from office only for misbehaviour or incapacity, and then only by resolution of both houses of the Oireachtas. The final court of appeal is the Supreme Court, which consists of the Chief Justice, nine ordinary judges and, ex officio the Presidents of the Court of Appeal and the High Court. The Supreme Court rarely sits as a full bench and normally hears cases in chambers of three, five or seven judges.

The courts established by the constitution have the power of judicial review and may declare to be invalid both laws and acts of the state which are repugnant to the constitution.

== Public sector ==
The Government, through the civil and public services and state-sponsored bodies, is a significant employer in the state; these three sectors are often called the public sector. Management of these various bodies vary, for instance in the civil service there will be clearly defined routes and patterns whilst among public services a sponsoring minister or the Minister for Finance may appoint a board or commission. Commercial activities, where the state involves itself, are typically through the state-sponsored bodies which are usually organised in a similar fashion to private companies.

A 2005 report on public sector employment, showed that in June 2005 the numbers employed in the public sector stood at 350,100; of these by sector they were 38,700 (civil service), 254,100 (public service) and 57,300 (state-sponsored). The total workforce of the state was 1,857,400 that year, thus the public sector represents approximately 20% of the total workforce.

=== Civil service ===
The Civil Service of Ireland consists of two broad components, the Civil Service of the Government and the Civil Service of the State. Whilst these two components are largely theoretical, they do have some fundamental operational differences. The Civil Service is expected to maintain the political impartiality in its work, and some sections of it are entirely independent of government decision making.

=== Public service ===
The public service is a relatively broad term and is not clearly defined and sometimes is taken to include the civil service. The public service proper consists of government agencies and bodies which provide services on behalf of the government but are not the core civil service. For instance local authorities, Education and Training Boards and Garda Síochána are considered to be public services.

== Local government ==
Article 28A of the constitution of Ireland provides a constitutional basis for local government. The Oireachtas is empowered to establish the number, size and powers of local authorities by law. Under Article 28A, members of local authorities must be directly elected by voters at least once every five years.

Local government in Ireland is governed by a series of Local Government Acts, beginning with the Local Government (Ireland) Act 1898. The most significant of these is the Local Government Act 2001, which established a two-tier structure of local government. The Local Government Reform Act 2014 abolished the bottom tier, the town councils, leaving 31 local authorities. There are 26 County Councils (County Dublin having been divided into three council areas), 3 City Councils (Dublin, Cork and Galway), and 2 City and County Councils (Limerick and Waterford).

== Political parties ==
A number of political parties are represented in the Dáil and coalition governments are common. The Irish electoral system has been historically characterised as a two-and-a-half party system, with two large catch-all parties, this being the centre-right Fine Gael and the centrist Fianna Fáil, dominating, and the "half-party", being Labour. This changed after the 2011 general election, following the large drop in support for Fianna Fáil and the rise in support for other parties. Ireland's political landscape changed dramatically after the 2020 general election, when Sinn Féin made gains to become the joint-largest party in the Dáil, making Ireland a three party system.

Fianna Fáil, a traditionally Irish republican party founded in 1927 by Éamon de Valera, is the largest party in the Dáil and considered centrist in Irish politics. It first formed a government on the basis of a populist programme of land redistribution and national preference in trade and republican populism remains a key part of its appeal. It has formed government seven times since Ireland gained independence: 1932–1948, 1951–1954, 1957–1973, 1977–1981, 1982, 1987–1994, 1997–2011, and 2020-Present. Fianna Fáil was the largest party in the Dáil from 1932 to 2011. It lost a huge amount of support in the 2011 general election, going from 71 to 20 seats, its lowest ever. Its loss in support was mainly due to its handling of the 2008 economic recession. It has since regained some support, but is yet to recover to its pre-2011 levels.

The second largest party is Sinn Féin, established in its current form in 1970 as a breakaway faction from the original political party of the same name (the remaining part has had several changes of name since, and is now known as the Workers' Party). The original Sinn Féin party played a major role in the Irish War of Independence and the First Dáil, and both Fine Gael and Fianna Fáil trace their origins to this party, having split from it in 1922 and 1926, respectively. The current-day party split from this older Sinn Féin in a dispute over political ideology and a perceived lack of support for the so-called “armed struggle” against British rule in Northern Ireland, and as a result the newer party has been historically linked to the Provisional IRA. The party is a Republican party which takes a strongly left wing stance on economics and social policy, placing it to the left of the Labour party. Sinn Féin received the highest share of first-preference votes in the 2020 general election, but finished level with Fianna Fáil in overall seats once vote transfers had been counted.

The third-largest party in the Dáil is Fine Gael, which has its origins in the pro-Treaty faction of Michael Collins in the Irish Civil War. Traditionally regarded as the party of law and order, it is associated with strong belief in pro-enterprise and reward. Despite expressions of Social Democracy by previous leader Garret FitzGerald, today, it remains a Christian democratic, economically liberal party along European lines, with a strongly pro-European outlook. Fine Gael was formed in 1933 out of a merger of Cumann na nGaedheal (which had split from the original Sinn Féin in 1922), the National Centre Party and the paramilitary Blueshirts organisation. In more recent years it has generally been associated with a liberal, progressive, outlook. Fine Gael has formed governments in the periods 1922–1932 (as Cumann na nGaedheal), 1948–1951, 1954–1957, 1973–1977, 1981–1982, 1982–1987, 1994–1997, and from 2011 to present. In the 2011 general election, Fine Gael won 78 seats, its highest ever total, and a massive increase from the previous election.

The fourth-largest party in the Dáil is the centre-left Labour Party which was founded by James Connolly and Jim Larkin in 1912. Labour has formal links with the trade union movement and has governed in seven coalition governments – six led by Fine Gael and one by Fianna Fáil. This recurring role as a junior coalition partner has led to Labour being classed as the "half" party in Ireland's "two-and-a-half party system". Labour won a record number of seats, 37, at the 2011 general election, becoming the second-largest party for the first time in its history, following the collapse in support for Fianna Fáil. In 2011, Labour went into coalition with Fine Gael, who had also won a record number of seats. Labour retained its place as one of Ireland's three largest parties up until the 2016 general election, when it suffered the worst general election defeat in its history, gaining just 7 seats. Much of this was due to being part of a government that had introduced unpopular austerity measures to deal with the economic crisis.

The fifth-largest Dáil party is the centre-left Social Democrats. The Social Democrats were founded in 2015 and made gains at the 2020 and 2024 general elections.

The People Before Profit–Solidarity electoral alliance, consisting of People Before Profit and Solidarity, is the 7th-largest party grouping within Dáil Éireann. Formed in 2015, the group represents a left-wing, socialist viewpoint.

Aontú, a party formed in 2019 by Sinn Féin members who were opposed to repealing the eighth amendment, has two TDs.

A party which gained at the 2024 election, was Independent Ireland, a party formed in November 2023. The leader, Michael Collins has said that the party seeks to provide "a comfortable alternative" to voters unhappy with the Fianna Fáil–Fine Gael–Green Party coalition but unwilling to vote for Sinn Féin. It has 4 TDs and one MEP.

Sixteen of the 174 TDs in the 34th Dáil are Independent.

=== Party details ===
Party	Current leader(s)	Founded	Inaugural leader(s)	Position	International affiliation	EP group
Fianna Fáil	Micheál Martin	1926	Éamon de Valera	Centre to centre-right	LI	Renew
Sinn Féin	Mary Lou McDonald	1905 (Note: The original Sinn Féin party split in 1970, with the majority faction becoming Official Sinn Féin (later renamed to the Workers' Party). One of the smaller factions formed a party named Provisional Sinn Féin, and after Official Sinn Féin changed its name, Provisional Sinn Féin changed its name to Sinn Féin. Although the present Sinn Féin was founded in 1970, it claims to be a continuation of the original Sinn Féin.)	Arthur Griffith	Centre-left to left-wing	—N/a	The Left
Fine Gael	Simon Harris	1933	Eoin O'Duffy	Centre to centre-right	CDI	EPP
Green Party; Comhaontas Glas	Roderic O'Gorman	1981	—N/a (Note: For the first twenty years of its existence, the Green Party did not have a national leader. Trevor Sargent was elected as the first national leader in 2001.)	Centre-left to left-wing	GG	Greens/EFA
Labour Party	Ivana Bacik	1912	James Connolly; James Larkin; William O'Brien	Centre-left	PA; SI	S&D
Social Democrats	Holly Cairns	2015	Catherine Murphy; Róisín Shortall; Stephen Donnelly	Centre-left	—N/a	—N/a
PBP–Solidarity	Collective leadership	2015	—N/a	Left-wing to far-left	—N/a	—N/a
Independent Ireland	Michael Collins	2023	Michael Collins	Centre-right to right-wing	—N/a	Renew
Aontú	Peadar Tóibín	2019	Peadar Tóibín	Fiscal: left-wing Social: right wing	—N/a	—N/a
100% Redress	Tomás Seán Devine	2023	Tomás Seán Devine	Single-issue	—N/a	—N/a
Human Dignity Alliance	Rónán Mullen	2018	Rónán Mullen	Right-wing	—N/a	—N/a
Right to Change	Joan Collins	2020	Joan Collins	Left-wing	—N/a	—N/a
Workers and Unemployed Action	Séamus Healy	1985	Séamus Healy	Left-wing	—N/a	—N/a
Workers' Party	Michael McCorry	1970 (Note: The Workers' Party emerged as the majority faction from a split in Sinn Féin in 1970, becoming known as Official Sinn Féin. In the Republic of Ireland, it renamed itself as Sinn Féin The Workers' Party in 1977. In Northern Ireland, it continued with the Republican Clubs name used by Sinn Féin to escape a 1964 ban, and later as Workers Party Republican Clubs. Both sections adopted the current name in 1982.)	Arthur Griffith	Far-left	IMCWP	—N/a
Republican Sinn Féin	Seosamh Ó Maoileoin	1986 (Note: Republican Sinn Féin split from Sinn Féin in 1986 over the policy of abstentionism.)	Ruairí Ó Brádaigh	Left-wing	—N/a	—N/a
Independent Left	—N/a	2019	—N/a	Left-wing	—N/a	—N/a

=== Party representation ===
Party	Representation (as of Oct. 2026)			
Party	Oireachtas		European Parliament	Local councils
Party	Dáil Éireann	Seanad Éireann	European Parliament	Local councils
Fianna Fáil	48 / 174	19 / 60	4 / 14	246 / 949
Sinn Féin (Note: Sinn Féin also has 7 members of the UK House of Commons, 27 members of the Northern Ireland Assembly, 144 local councillors in Northern Ireland.)	39 / 174	6 / 60	2 / 14	99 / 949
Fine Gael	38 / 174	16 / 60	4 / 14	246 / 949
Social Democrats	12 / 174	1 / 60	0 / 14	31 / 949
Labour	11 / 174	2 / 60	1 / 14	57 / 949
Independent Ireland	4 / 174	0 / 60	1 / 14	27 / 949
PBP–Solidarity (Note: People Before Profit also has 1 member of the Northern Ireland Assembly and 2 local councillors in Northern Ireland)	3 / 174	0 / 60	0 / 14	12 / 949
Aontú	2 / 174	1 / 60	0 / 14	10 / 949
Green (Note: The Green Party also has 5 local councillors in Northern Ireland)	1 / 174	1 / 60	0 / 14	23 / 949
100% Redress	1 / 174	0 / 60	0 / 14	4 / 949
Right to Change	0 / 174	0 / 60	0 / 14	1 / 949
Kerry Ind. Alliance	0 / 174	0 / 60	0 / 14	1 / 949
Workers and Unemployed	0 / 174	0 / 60	0 / 14	1 / 949
Republican Sinn Féin (Note: Unregistered party)	0 / 174	0 / 60	0 / 14	1 / 949
Independent Left	0 / 174	0 / 60	0 / 14	1 / 949

Election to the 34th Dáil – 29 November 2024
Party	Leader	First-preference votes			Seats				
Party	Leader	Votes	FPv% (Note: Parties are entitled to public funding proportionate to their first-preference vote (subject to a minimum 2% FPv).)	Swing (pp)	Cand.	2020	Out.	Elected 2024	Change
Fianna Fáil	Micheál Martin	481,414	21.86	▼0.32	82	38 (Note: Including Seán Ó Fearghaíl (FF), returned automatically for Kildare South as outgoing Ceann Comhairle, under Art. 16.6 of the Constitution and the Electoral Act 1992.)	36	48	▲10
Sinn Féin	Mary Lou McDonald	418,627	19.01	▼5.52	71	37	33	39	▲2
Fine Gael	Simon Harris	458,134	20.80	▼0.06	80	35	32	38	▲3
Social Democrats	Holly Cairns	106,028	4.81	▲1.91	26	6	6	11	▲5
Labour	Ivana Bacik	102,457	4.65	▲0.27	32	6	6	11	▲5
Independent Ireland	Michael Collins	78,276	3.55	New	28	New	3	4	New
PBP–Solidarity (Note: People Before Profit and Solidarity contested this election as People Before Profit–Solidarity. People Before Profit had 33 candidates, and Solidarity had 9 candidates. They issued separate manifestos.) •People Before Profit •Solidarity	Collective leadership •Richard Boyd Barrett •Collective leadership	62,481; 49,344; 13,137	2.84; 2.24; 0.60	▲0.21 ▲0.40 ▲0.01	42; 33; 9	5; 4; 1	5; 4; 1	3; 2; 1	▼2 ▼2
Aontú	Peadar Tóibín	86,134	3.91	▲2.01	43	1	1	2	▲1
Green	Roderic O'Gorman	66,911	3.04	▼4.09	43	12	12	1	▼11
100% Redress	Tomás Devine	6,862	0.31	New	1	New	0	1	New
Irish Freedom	Hermann Kelly	14,838	0.67	▲0.42	16	0	0	0	Steady
The Irish People (Note: Member party of the National Alliance)	Anthony Cahill	7,626	0.35	New	21	New	0	0	New
National Party	Disputed	6,511	0.30	▲0.08	9	0	0	0	Steady
Inds. 4 Change	None	5,166	0.23	▼0.15	3	1	0	0	▼1
Ireland First	Derek Blighe	3,339	0.15	New	2	New	0	0	New
Right to Change	Joan Collins	2,907	0.13	New	1	New	1	0	New
Liberty Republic	Ben Gilroy	1,936	0.09	New	6	New	0	0	New
Party for Animal Welfare	Darren Furlong	884	0.04	New	3	New	0	0	New
Rabharta	Lorna Bogue	626	0.03	New	3	New	0	0	New
Centre Party (Note: Formerly Renua.)	Andrew Kelly	548	0.02	▼0.23	3	0	0	0	Steady
Independent (Note: Includes Séamus Healy who was a member of the Workers and Unemployed Action party but stood as an independent candidate in this election.)	—	290,748	13.20	▲1.00	171	19	20	16	▼3
Vacant	—N/a	—N/a	—N/a	—N/a	—N/a	—N/a	5	—N/a	—N/a
Total valid		2,202,453	99.3						
Spoilt votes		15,849	0.7						
Total		2,218,302	100	—	686	160	160	174	▲14
Registered voters/Turnout		3,715,285	59.71	▼3.00					
Source : Houses Of the Oireachtas

== Foreign relations ==
Ireland's foreign relations are substantially influenced by its membership of the European Union, although bilateral relations with the United States and United Kingdom are also important to the country. It is one of the group of smaller nations in the EU, and has traditionally followed a non-aligned foreign policy.

=== Military neutrality ===
Ireland tends towards independence in foreign policy, thus it is not a member of NATO and has a longstanding policy of military neutrality.

This policy has helped the Irish Defence Forces to be successful in their contributions to UN peace-keeping missions since 1960 (in the Congo Crisis ONUC) and subsequently in Cyprus (UNFICYP), Lebanon (UNIFIL), Iran/Iraq Border (UNIIMOG), Bosnia and Herzegovina (SFOR & EUFOR Althea), Ethiopia and Eritrea (UNMEE), Liberia (UNMIL), East Timor (INTERFET), Darfur and Chad (EUFOR Tchad/RCA).

== Northern Ireland ==
Northern Ireland has been a major factor in Irish politics since the island of Ireland was divided between Northern Ireland and what is now the Republic in 1920. The creation of Northern Ireland led to conflict between northern nationalists (mostly Roman Catholic) who seek unification with the Republic and Unionists (mostly Protestant) who opposed British plans for Irish Home Rule and wished for Northern Ireland to remain within the United Kingdom. After the formation of Northern Ireland in 1921 following its opt out from the newly formed Irish Free State, many Roman Catholics and Republicans were discriminated against. The abolition of Proportional Representation and the gerrymandering of constituency boundaries led to Unionists being over-represented at Stormont and at Westminster. Even James Craig who was prime minister of Northern Ireland boasted of his Protestant Parliament for a Protestant People. In the 1960s NICRA was set up to end discrimination between Catholics and Protestants. There was a massive backlash to this from sections of the Unionist community. This conflict exploded into violence in the late sixties with the beginning of the Troubles, involving groups such as the Provisional IRA, loyalist paramilitaries, the police and the British army, the latter originally drafted in to protect Catholic communities from loyalist violence. These clashes were to result in the suspension of the Stormont Parliament and unsuccessful efforts by the British Government to encourage a power-sharing Executive in Northern Ireland which were only realised following the Good Friday Agreement in 1998. The Troubles caused thousands of deaths in Northern Ireland but also spilled over into bombings and acts of violence in England and the Republic.

Since its foundation it has been the stated long-term policy of governments of what is now the Republic to bring an end to the conflict in Northern Ireland and to bring about a united Ireland. Northern Ireland has also, in the past, often been a source of tension between the Irish Government and the government of the United Kingdom. To find a solution to the Troubles the Irish Government became a partner in the Good Friday Agreement in 1998.

While Sinn Féin have long organised in both Northern Ireland and the Republic, Fianna Fáil did not register as a party in Derry until December 2007, when it also began recruiting members at Queen's University, Belfast although both are extremely small.

=== North/South Ministerial Council ===
Under the Good Friday Agreement and Article 3 of the Constitution a North-South Ministerial Council and six North-South Implementation Bodies co-ordinate activities and exercise a limited governmental role within certain policy areas across the whole island of Ireland. The Implementation Bodies have limited executive authority in six policy areas. Meetings of the Council take the form of meetings between ministers from both the Republic's Government and the Northern Ireland Executive. The council was suspended from 2002 to 2007. However, with the resumption of devolved government in Northern Ireland in May 2007, the council has now re-assumed its duties.

== See also ==
- Censorship in the Republic of Ireland
- Corruption in the Republic of Ireland
- Dáil constituencies
- Elections in the Republic of Ireland
- History of the Republic of Ireland
- History of Ireland
- List of Dáil by-elections
- Politics of Northern Ireland
