= 2019 Cork City Council election =

Part of the 2019 Irish local elections

- 24 May 2019

All 31 seats on Cork City Council 16 seats needed for a majority
	First party	Second party	Third party
Party	Fianna Fáil	Fine Gael	Green
Seats won	8	7	4
Seat change	▼2	▲2	▲4
	Fourth party	Fifth party	Sixth party
Party	Sinn Féin	Labour	Solidarity
Seats won	4	1	1
Seat change	▼4	▲1	▼2
	Seventh party	Eighth party
Party	Workers' Party	Independent
Seats won	1	5
Seat change	Steady	▲1
- Results by Local Electoral Area

An election to all 31 seats on Cork City Council was held in Cork city in Ireland on 24 May 2019 as part of that year's local elections. Councillors were elected from five local electoral areas (LEAs) on the electoral system of proportional representation by means of the single transferable vote (PR-STV). This election coincided with an increase in the city area. Several outgoing members of Cork County Council, based in areas transferred to the city, stood for election to the city council. As well as the extension of all LEAs into the former county area, the former LEA of North Central was abolished and its area divided between North West and North East.

On the same day, a plebiscite was held under the Local Government Act 2019 on whether Cork City should have a directly elected executive mayor. Voters rejected the proposal in favour of retaining the existing ceremonial Lord Mayor of Cork, chosen annually by the councillors from among their number.

== Results by party ==
Party	Seats	±	1st pref	FPv%	±%
Fianna Fáil	8	▼2	16,474	24.52	▲0.53
Fine Gael	7	▲2	13,834	20.59	▲1.63
Sinn Féin	4	▼4	8,082	12.03	▼11.96
Green	4	▲4	6,890	10.25	▲7.27
Labour	1	▲1	3,773	5.62	▼0.33
Solidarity	1	▼2	1,574	2.34	▼3.52
Workers' Party	1	Steady	1,182	1.76	▼1.28
Social Democrats	0	Steady	1,906	2.84	New
Aontú	0	Steady	1,593	2.37	New
HRRA	0	Steady	1,462	2.18	New
People Before Profit	0	Steady	559	0.83	New
Independent	5	▲1	9,863	14.68	▼0.37
Totals	31	Steady	67,192	100.00	

== Results by local electoral area ==
*: Outgoing councillor elected in 2014 for the same LEA.
†: Outgoing councillor elected in 2014 for Cork City North Central LEA.
‡: Outgoing councillor elected in 2014 for Cork City North East LEA.
§: Outgoing councillor elected in 2014 to Cork County Council.
※: Outgoing councillor coopted for the same LEA subsequent to the 2014 election.
◊: Outgoing councillor for Cork County Council, coopted subsequent to the 2014 election.

=== Cork City North East ===
Cork City North East: 6 seats
Party	Candidate	FPv%	Count									
Party	Candidate	FPv%	1	2	3	4	5	6	7	8	9	10
Fianna Fáil	Ken O'Flynn (Note: Change since the 2019 election, see below.)	12.75%	1,710	1,718	1,725	1,733	1,741	1,807	1,841	1,931		
Labour	John Daniel Maher	10.03%	1,345	1,345	1,363	1,378	1,410	1,459	1,559	1,667	1,834	1,985
Independent	Ger Keohane	9.54%	1,279	1,287	1,298	1,308	1,320	1,342	1,382	1,425	1,513	1,709
Fine Gael	Joe Kavanagh	9.35%	1,254	1,258	1,262	1,264	1,275	1,309	1,323	1,341	1,383	1,756
Green	Oliver Moran	8.80%	1,180	1,184	1,210	1,216	1,307	1,324	1,482	1,540	1,628	1,739
Fianna Fáil	Tim Brosnan	7.81%	1,048	1,050	1,057	1,064	1,069	1,232	1,267	1,290	1,356	1,441
Fine Gael	Lorraine O'Neill	7.81%	1,047	1,055	1,059	1,072	1,089	1,110	1,125	1,144	1,178	
Workers' Party	Ted Tynan	7.69%	1,031	1,038	1,070	1,088	1,110	1,141	1,314	1,532	1,764	1,817
Independent	Noreen Murphy	6.08%	815	819	844	862	879	895	996	1,079		
Solidarity	Carol Brogan	5.14%	689	690	722	726	810	822				
Sinn Féin	Mick Nugent	4.98%	668	668	674	818	826	844	910			
Fianna Fáil	Martin Dorgan	3.60%	483	485	485	487	487					
Social Democrats	Sinéad Halpin	2.30%	309	309	320	327						
Sinn Féin	Mandy O'Leary Hegarty	1.99%	267	268	272							
Independent	Mobolaji Taiwo Ajisafe	0.92%	123	123								
HRRA	Risteárd Ó Glaimhín	0.77%	103	104								
Independent	Sean Patrick O'Sullivan	0.45%	60									
Electorate: 30,910 Valid: 13,411 Spoilt: 287 Quota: 1,916 Turnout: 44.32%

=== Cork City North West ===
Cork City North West: 6 seats
Party	Candidate	FPv%	Count											
Party	Candidate	FPv%	1	2	3	4	5	6	7	8	9	10	11	12
Fianna Fáil	Tony Fitzgerald	14.11%	1,662	1,664	1,671	1,676	1,684							
Sinn Féin	Thomas Gould	11.91%	1,402	1,409	1,426	1,499	1,518	1,563	1,596	1,654	1,700			
Sinn Féin	Kenneth Collins	9.74%	1,147	1,154	1,178	1,209	1,217	1,253	1,276	1,319	1,361	1,425	1,456	1,512
Fine Gael	Damian Boylan	8.99%	1,059	1,059	1,059	1,063	1,069	1,071	1,089	1,119	1,175	1,227	1,285	1,452
Fianna Fáil	John Sheehan	8.69%	1,023	1,023	1,025	1,035	1,035	1,047	1,087	1,271	1,310	1,370	1,432	1,570
Solidarity	Fiona Ryan	7.52%	885	887	915	930	985	1,017	1,050	1,073	1,134	1,182	1,400	1,482
Fine Gael	Julie O'Leary	5.95%	701	701	702	703	709	713	732	764	836	876	1,019	1,136
Green	Mark Cronin	4.78%	563	567	579	580	592	595	612	637	755	782		
Independent	Kevin Conway	4.55%	536	569	578	583	594	602	669	712	747	877	925	
Labour	Luke Carroll	4.48%	528	532	538	542	548	558	576	594				
Fianna Fáil	Seán Coleman	4.47%	526	529	536	539	541	546	565					
Independent	Joe O'Callaghan	4.04%	476	482	485	491	502	527	586	606	637			
Aontú	Finian Toomey	3.75%	442	444	445	454	467	488						
Independent	Timothy J. Hogan	1.77%	208	219	234	237	246							
Sinn Féin	John Paul Stanton	1.56%	184	184	185									
HRRA	Martina Murphy	1.49%	175	178	190	192								
Workers' Party	Catherine Coffey	1.28%	151	159										
Independent	Sandra Condon	0.92%	108											
Electorate: 28,571 Valid: 11,776 Spoilt: 324 Quota: 1,683 Turnout: 42.35%

=== Cork City South Central ===
Cork City South Central: 6 seats
Party	Candidate	FPv%	Count													
Party	Candidate	FPv%	1	2	3	4	5	6	7	8	9	10	11	12	13	14
Independent	Mick Finn	16.56%	1,753													
Green	Dan Boyle	13.75%	1,456	1,485	1,495	1,509	1,523									
Fianna Fáil	Seán Martin	13.06%	1,383	1,421	1,430	1,437	1,443	1,448	1,457	1,481	1,547					
Fine Gael	Shane O'Callaghan	11.66%	1,234	1,250	1,250	1,253	1,256	1,276	1,282	1,313	1,346	1,450	1,775			
Sinn Féin	Eoghan Jeffers	7.34%	777	789	792	794	797	801	816	834	862	923	1,009	1,053	1,056	1,057
Fianna Fáil	David Boyle	7.26%	769	779	779	779	780	790	794	808	828	872				
Sinn Féin	Fiona Kerins	6.64%	703	732	737	745	761	777	793	868	929	1,014	1,049	1,062	1,066	1,070
Independent	Paudie Dineen	5.21%	552	597	603	615	626	640	699	731	846	935	1,016	1,058	1,069	1,071
Labour	Luke Field	4.34%	459	472	475	479	483	513	535	634	672					
Independent	Ciaran Kenneally	4.03%	427	443	449	457	474	491	551	586						
Social Democrats	Patricia O'Dwyer	3.40%	360	367	371	384	401	430	443							
Independent	Seán Cronin	1.97%	209	220	226	232	249	271								
Independent	Lekha Menon Margassery	1.88%	199	202	207	214	222									
HRRA	Michael Mohally	1.19%	126	129	134	142										
Independent	Graham O'Shea	0.88%	93	97	112											
Independent	Suzanne Hegarty	0.43%	45	48												
Independent	Maurice Joseph Sexton	0.40%	42	43												
Exhausted ballots		—	—	0	14	34	59	114	181	296	521	810	1,155	1,318	1,334	1,337
Electorate: 24,408 Valid: 10,587 Spoilt: 306 Quota: 1,513 Turnout: 44.6%

=== Cork City South East ===
Cork City South East: 6 seats
Party	Candidate	FPv%	Count							
Party	Candidate	FPv%	1	2	3	4	5	6	7	8
Fine Gael	Des Cahill	14.42%	2,275							
Green	Lorna Bogue	13.99%	2,207	2,265						
Fianna Fáil	Mary Rose Desmond	13.32%	2,102	2,108	2,111	2,139	2,167	2.294		
Fianna Fáil	Terry Shannon	12.52%	1,976	1,980	1,983	2,051	2,094	2,155	2,167	2,328
Independent	Kieran McCarthy	10.82%	1,708	1,731	1,734	1,889	2,038	2,208	2,216	2,552
Fine Gael	Deirdre Forde	10.06%	1,588	1,597	1,605	1,634	1,662	1,777	1,787	1,926
Sinn Féin	Chris O'Leary	6.99%	1,103	1,129	1,129	1,158	1,273	1,387	1,391	1,518
Labour	Peter Horgan	5.63%	888	899	901	921	956	1,029	1,034	
Social Democrats	Joe Harris	4.34%	685	718	718	748	816			
Aontú	Anna Daly	3.16%	498	509	510					
HRRA	Diarmaid Ó Cadhla	3.14%	496	534	534	581				
People Before Profit	Ed Fitzgerald	1.62%	255							
Electorate: 32,358 Valid: 15,781 Spoilt: 326 Quota: 2,255 Turnout: 49.78%

=== Cork City South West ===
Cork City South West: 7 seats
Party	Candidate	FPv%	Count												
Party	Candidate	FPv%	1	2	3	4	5	6	7	8	9	10	11	12	13
Fine Gael	Derry Canty	12.03%	1,881	1,894	1,898	1,915	1,946	2,033							
Fianna Fáil	Fergal Dennehy	11.66%	1,823	1,835	1,840	1,870	1,921	2,055							
Green	Colette Finn	9.49%	1,484	1,501	1,582	1,630	1,765	1,796	1,805	1,815	2,042				
Fianna Fáil	Colm Kelleher	8.56%	1,339	1,352	1,360	1,370	1,397	1,637	1,702	1,731	1,793	1,806	1,896	1,989	
Fine Gael	Garret Kelleher	8.35%	1,306	1,319	1,323	1,335	1,354	1,401	1,413	1,420	1,480	1,493	1,540	1,713	1,786
Independent	Thomas Moloney	7.51%	1,174	1,192	1,211	1,302	1,350	1,361	1,362	1,362	1,418	1,430	1,599	1,689	1,774
Sinn Féin	Henry Cremin	6.68%	1,045	1,049	1,064	1,106	1,129	1,139	1,142	1,144	1,167	1,178	1,202	1,236	1,755
Sinn Féin	Eolan Ryng	5.03%	786	795	814	852	869	892	894	901	958	969	1,011	1,042	
Fine Gael	Sinéad Ronan	4.85%	758	764	768	792	873	879	879	880	920	930	964	1,208	1,275
Fine Gael	P.J. Hourican	4.67%	731	732	735	747	766	776	779	782	806	813	836		
Aontú	Joanne Murphy	4.18%	653	665	673	697	711	719	721	723	768	778			
Fianna Fáil	Shane Fallon	4.03%	630	636	641	644	654								
Labour	Ciara Kennedy	3.54%	553	567	583	610									
Social Democrats	Ciarán McCarthy	3.53%	552	557	589	632	695	708	711	716					
HRRA	Thomas Kiely	2.48%	388	439	499										
People Before Profit	Tjitske De Vries	1.94%	304	324											
HRRA	Shirley Griffin	1.11%	174												
Independent	Artur Górnik	0.36%	56												
Electorate: 34,436 Valid: 15,637 Spoilt: 373 Quota: 1,955 Turnout: 46.49%

== Results by gender ==
2019 Cork City Council election Candidates by gender
Gender	Number of candidates	% of candidates	Elected councillors	% of councillors
Men	58	70.7%	25	80.6%
Women	24	29.3%	6	19.4%
TOTAL	82		31	

== Plebiscite ==
2019 Cork City Council mayoral plebiscite
Choice	Votes	%
For	33,364	49.27
Against	34,347	50.73
Total	67,711	100.00
Valid votes	67,711	98.59
Invalid/blank votes	971	1.41
Total votes	68,682	100.00

== Changes ==
=== Co-options ===
Party	Outgoing	LEA	Reason	Date	Co-optee
Sinn Féin	Thomas Gould	Cork City North West	Elected to the 33rd Dáil	February 2020	Mick Nugent
Sinn Féin	Henry Cremin	Cork City South West	Retirement	June 2021	Eolan Ryng
PBP–Solidarity	Fiona Ryan	Cork City North West	Resigned for health reasons	June 2023	Brian McCarthy
Sinn Féin	Eolan Ryng	Cork City South West	Resignation	13 November 2023	Orla O'Leary

=== Changes in affiliation ===
Name	LEA	Elected as	New affiliation	Date
Ken O'Flynn	Cork City North East	Fianna Fáil	Independent	January 2020
Lorna Bogue	Cork South East	Green	Independent	October 2020
Lorna Bogue	Cork South East	Independent	Rabharta	June 2021
Ken O'Flynn	Cork City North East	Independent	Independent Ireland	March 2024

== See also ==
- 2019 Cork North-Central by-election, on 28 November; seven of the candidates had run in the city council elections

== Sources ==
- "Local Elections 2019: Results, Transfer of Votes and Statistics" (PDF). Department of Housing, Planning and Local Government (DHPLG). pp. 14–23. Archived from the original (PDF) on 10 June 2020.
- Loughlin, Elaine (30 April 2019). "Local elections — Cork City South Central: It's too tough to call in Cork's 'constituency of death'". Irish Examiner.
- O'Neill, Kevin (29 April 2019). "Local elections — Cork City North East: SF looking to make most of change; Labour hopeful of recovery". Irish Examiner.
- O'Neill, Kevin (1 May 2019). "Local elections — Cork City North West: Rural influx changes constituency profile". Irish Examiner.
- O'Neill, Kevin (2 May 2019). "Local elections — Cork City South West: Constituency thrown open by boundary extensions and candidate withdrawals". Irish Examiner.
- O'Neill, Kevin (3 May 2019). "Local elections — Cork City South East: Revamped electoral area covers huge geographical spread". Irish Examiner.
- "Cork City Council - The Results". Irish Examiner. 15 May 2019. Archived from the original on 30 May 2020.
