= Gary O'Flynn =

Irish former politician

Cork City Councillor
- In office Autumn 2003 – 2008
- Constituency: Cork City North Central

Personal details
- Born: 1975 or 1976 (age 49–50)
- Party: Fianna Fáil
- Parent: Noel O'Flynn (father)
- Relatives: Ken O'Flynn (brother)

Gary O'Flynn, later known as Joseph O'Donovan, is a former politician and barrister from County Cork. O'Flynn has been involved in several high-profile legal issues since the early 2010s, which have been attributed to on-going mental health issues.

== Biography ==
O'Flynn was born in County Cork in 1975/1976 and is son of former Fianna Fáil TD Noel O'Flynn. He began his political career in 2003, taking his father’s seat on Cork City Council when the dual mandate ban was introduced. He held the seat until 2008 when he left the council and his brother Ken O'Flynn was co-opted.

In addition to his political work, O'Flynn was a qualified solicitor. He also ran a financial services company in the years leading up to his legal troubles.

=== Legal issues ===
In 2011, O'Flynn was involved in a public order incident at Gorby’s Nightclub in Cork, where he was convicted of possessing a knife, being drunk and a danger, and making threatening and abusive remarks. He received a six-month suspended sentence and a fine of €800 for these offences.

==== Soliciting the murder of three people, other issues ====
The following year, in 2012, O'Flynn’s behaviour escalated when he was charged with soliciting the murder of three individuals: Detective Garda Mary Skehan, Revenue Commissioner George Ross, and accountant Patrick Sweeney. These events took place between October 2012 and February 2013 in Cork. The case was brought before Cork District Court following a three-month investigation by an undercover Garda unit and later transferred to a judge and jury. In 2013, O'Flynn pleaded guilty to all three charges, citing his ongoing psychiatric care. He was granted legal aid due to his financial destitution, having spent a settlement from a defamation case on legal fees.

In July 2014 O'Flynn was sentenced to three years of jail, with two years suspended, after being found guilty of 13 counts of obtaining €1,000 by deception from a builder between 2009 and 2012.

in April 2015 O'Flynn was sentenced to five years in prison with the final two years suspended, for the soliciting murder.

=== Name change, continued legal issues ===
O'Flynn, under the name Joseph O'Donovan, appeared in Cork District Court in August 2022, charged with the harassment of a woman in Cork city. The charge stemmed from incidents that occurred on three separate dates between 30 July and 6 August 2022. O'Donovan made no reply when the charge was put to him at Bridewell Garda Station. The alleged offence was in violation of Section 10 of the Non-Fatal Offences Against the Person Act, 1997. While no objection to bail was raised, O'Donovan was subject to stringent conditions, including staying away from certain areas of Cork City and maintaining no contact with the alleged victim, either directly or via social media. He was also required to sign in at Gurranabraher Garda Station three times a week and adhere to a curfew from 10 pm to 7 am. O'Donovan was remanded on his own bond to appear in court again for DPP directions on 28 September 2022. On 1 March 2023, his defence solicitor, Frank Buttimer, requested the charge be dismissed due to the delay. Judge Olann Kelleher agreed and struck out the case, though it remained open for the State to re-enter the matter if necessary.
