= Damian Boylan =

Irish politician

Cllr Damian Boylan
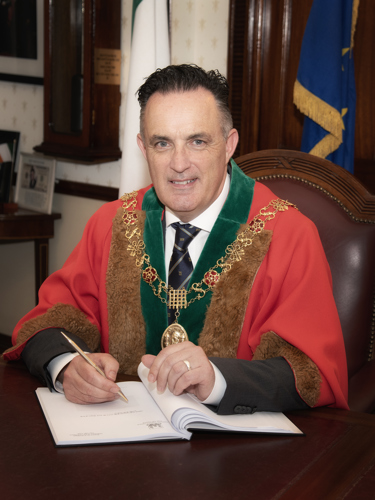
- Boylan in 2026

Lord Mayor of Cork
- Incumbent
- Assumed office 19 June 2026
- Preceded by: Fergal Dennehy

Cork City Councillor
- Incumbent
- Assumed office June 2019
- Constituency: Cork City North West

Personal details
- Party: Fine Gael
- Spouse: Brenda Boylan
- Children: 2

Damian Boylan is an Irish Fine Gael politician who has served as Lord Mayor of Cork since June 2026. He has been a Cork City Councillor for the Cork City North-West electoral area since 2019.

== Early life and background ==
Boylan is based in Blarney, County Cork, where he lives with his family. He was involved in community and civic initiatives in the Cork area prior to his election to Cork City Council, including being a founding member of the Blarney and District Chamber of Commerce.

== Political career ==
=== Cork City Councillor ===
Boylan was first elected to Cork City Council in the 2019 local elections, representing the Cork City North-West ward as a member of Fine Gael. He retained his seat in the 2024 local elections.

=== Lord Mayor of Cork ===
On 19 June 2026, Boylan was elected Lord Mayor of Cork at the annual meeting of Cork City Council, winning a council vote of 19 to 8 with one abstention. Boylan described his proposed approach to the office as being centred on a "be sound" philosophy, emphasising civic decency, cooperation, and community-minded governance.
