= Laura Harmon =

Irish politician (born 1986)

Senator Laura Harmon
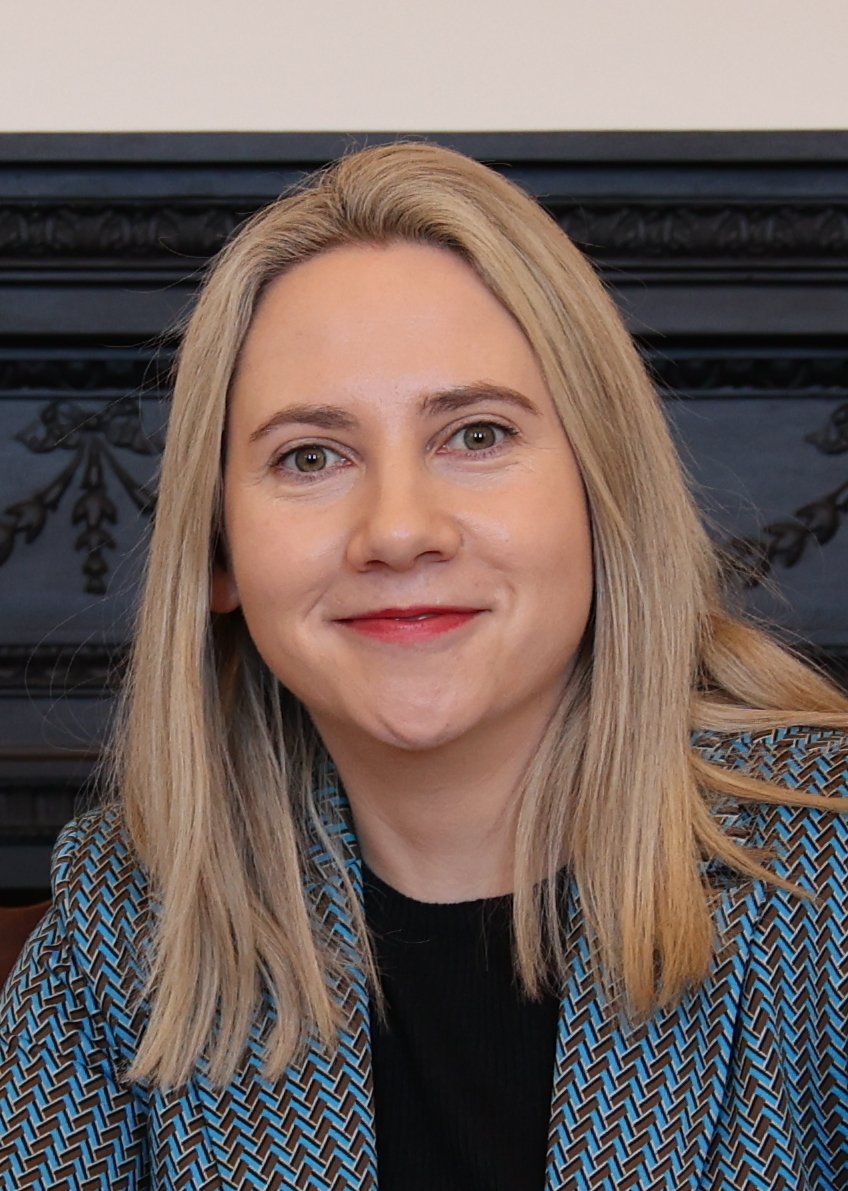
- Harmon in 2025

Senator
- Incumbent
- Assumed office 30 January 2025
- Constituency: Industrial and Commercial Panel

Cork City Councillor
- In office June 2024 – January 2025
- Constituency: Cork City South West

Personal details
- Born: 26 November 1986 (age 39) Cork, Ireland
- Party: Labour Party
- Education: University College Cork

Laura Harmon (born 26 November 1986) is an Irish Labour Party politician who has been a senator for the Industrial and Commercial Panel since January 2025. She was a member of Cork City Council for the South West area from June 2024 to January 2025.

She is the leader of the Centre-Left Cross-Party group in Seanad Éireann with Labour colleague Nessa Cosgrove, Malcom Noonan from the Green Party and Patricia Stephenson from the Social Democrats. Senator Harmon was appointed Labour's spokesperson for Further and Higher Education, Research, Innovation and Science and for Disability.

She is a former president of Aontas na Mac Léinn in Éirinn (AMLÉ), formerly the Union of Students in Ireland (USI). She was the first woman to fill the role in twenty years. In 2018, Harmon was mobilisation team lead for the Together For Yes campaign to repeal the Eighth Amendment of the Constitution of Ireland.

== Political activism ==
A graduate of University College Cork, Harmon served as vice-president for Equality and Citizenship of Aontas na Mac Léinn in Éirinn (AMLÉ) from 2012 to 2014. While in this role she co-signed a letter sent to Russia's ambassador to Ireland Maxim Peshkov, titled "Re: Torture of Russian LGBTQ* teenagers".

Harmon became president of AMLÉ and, in what was described as an "unprecedented move", AMLÉ endorsed her 2016 candidacy for the Seanad. During her tenure as AMLÉ president, Harmon played a prominent role in the campaign to legalise same-sex marriage. She was also a board member of the Higher Education Authority (2014–2015)

The Labour Party appointed Harmon as its Women and Equality Officer in September 2015, ahead of the 2016 general election. She used this role to promote the repeal of the Eighth Amendment of the Constitution.

During the Together for Yes campaign to repeal Eighth Amendment of the Constitution, Harmon was the lead of the mobilisation team. This work included organizing a national conversations tour which traveled across Ireland, co-ordinating the get out the vote phase of the campaign, organising regional launches and working on the register to vote campaign.

Harmon has campaigned for people with disabilities, access to education, and for survivors of institutional abuse.

She has published the Prohibition of Advertising or Importuning Sex for Rent Bill 2025 that would ban sex for rent advertisements in Ireland. Harmon has also drafted the Education (Personal Injuries) Bill 2025 to amend and extend assault leave for teachers and SNAs in Ireland.

== Electoral record ==
Harmon was an independent candidate for the National University of Ireland (NUI) constituency at the 2016 Seanad election. She polled 1,477 votes (4.1%) of first-preference votes but was not elected, coming in fifth out of thirty candidates. Harmon contested the NUI constituency again in 2020. She polled 2,187 first-preference votes (5.8%), but was not elected.

Harmon was elected at the 2024 Cork City Council election for the Cork City South West area for the Labour Party. She received 1,240 first preference votes, and placed 5th in the seven-seat local electoral area. She more than doubled the Labour vote since the 2019 local election. Later that year, she contested the 2024 general election in Cork South-Central but was eliminated on the 15th count. She successfully contested the 2025 Seanad election to the 27th Seanad as a Labour Party candidate for the Industrial and Commercial Panel.

== Personal life ==
Laura Harmon is the eldest of five daughters born in the Gaeltacht of Ballyvourney, County Cork. She is openly gay. She was educated through Irish and lives in Cork city.

== See also ==
- LGBTQ rights in the Republic of Ireland
