= Noel O'Flynn =

Irish former politician (born 1951)

Teachta Dála
- In office June 1997 – February 2011
- Constituency: Cork North-Central

Personal details
- Born: 1 December 1951 (age 74) Blackpool, Cork, Ireland
- Party: Independent Ireland (since 2024)
- Other political affiliations: Fianna Fáil (c.1997–2015)
- Spouse: Frances O'Keeffe
- Children: 3, including Ken and Gary
- Education: Regional Technical College, Cork

Noel O'Flynn (born 1 December 1951) is an Irish Fianna Fáil politician who served as a Teachta Dála (TD) for the Cork North-Central constituency from 1997 to 2011.

== Background and education ==
O'Flynn was educated at Regional Technical College, Cork. He is married to Frances O'Keeffe and they have three sons, including Kenneth who was co-opted onto Cork City Council in December 2008, and Gary who was a Cork City Councillor from 2003 to 2008, and was charged in March 2013 with soliciting the murder of a detective, an accountant and a Revenue official.

== Career ==
O'Flynn started a family business in 1985 in Blackpool, Cork, which supplies brake and clutch parts for trucks, buses, tractors, cars, and light commercial vehicles. The Irish Independent described O'Flynn as a “self-made businessman who founded a hugely successful motor industry supply firm.”

He was first elected to Dáil Éireann at the 1997 general election. He was re-elected, topping the poll, at the 2002 general election, and retained his seat at the 2007 general election.

Before the 2002 general election, O'Flynn stated that "some asylum-seekers in Cork were spongers, freeloaders and conmen". He was criticised in the Dáil for his comments, but maintained his stance.

He was Chairman of the Oireachtas Joint Committee on Communications Marine and Natural Resources from 2002–2007. He was also a member of the Oireachtas Joint Committees on European Scrutiny and on Foreign Affairs. Additionally, he served on the Joint Committees on Justice, Equality and Women’s Rights, the Oireachtas Joint Committee on Public Enterprise, the Joint Committee on Enterprise and Small Business, the Government Whip on the Finance and Public Services Committee and the CTC sub-committee which undertook an inquiry into CIE. He also served on the Southern Health Board.

O'Flynn served on Cork City Council (then called Cork Corporation) from 1991 to 2003 having been re-elected in 1991 and 1999 in the North–Central electoral area. He resigned his seat in July 2003 because of the dual mandate rules which prohibit members of the Oireachtas from sitting on a local authority. The seat was filled by the co-option of his son Gary O'Flynn. Gary stood down from Cork City Council in 2008 and was replaced by his brother, Ken. Gary, a solicitor, was given a three-year prison sentence for attempting to hire a hitman (who was an undercover garda) to kill a garda, a Revenue Commission official and an accountant. He was diagnosed with a severe psychiatric illness.

In January 2011, O'Flynn called for Taoiseach Brian Cowen to step down as Fianna Fáil leader. He also announced that month that he would not contest the 2011 general election. Fianna Fáil leader Micheál Martin had asked O'Flynn not to run for the sake of the party as he believed there would only be one seat for Fianna Fáil in the constituency. He had already circulated election literature before withdrawing his candidacy. O'Flynn later slated the FF leadership for allegedly failing to properly support the Seanad election bid of his son, Ken, in mid 2011.

O'Flynn left Fianna Fáil in 2015, due to his dissatisfaction with party leader Micheál Martin. In March 2014, he criticised party leader Micheál Martin and said the party was cannibalising itself under his leadership. O'Flynn said that Martin was “an interim leader” and that he was still closely associated with Bertie Ahern and Brian Cowen, with whom he served in cabinet. He said he was appalled by what has happened to Fianna Fáil over the past few years, and said the party had failed to attract public support since the 2011 general election. O'Flynn stated that he would never stand for Fianna Fáil again but said he might consider running as an Independent. In 2016, he ruled out running in the forthcoming general election following a health scare and discussions with his family. O'Flynn said that he had consulted widely, telephoning around 1,000 of his supporters throughout the autumn and most had indicated that he should run as an independent.

In 2018, O'Flynn was made an honorary tribal leader in Kenya “in recognition of his support of businesses.” O'Flynn was also given a Friendship Medal of Diplomacy by the government of Taiwan in the past. The medal was awarded by Timothy Yang, the Taiwanese foreign minister, for O'Flynn's “contribution to the advancement of bilateral relations between Ireland and Taiwan.” O'Flynn was a member of the Ireland-Taiwan Parliamentary Friendship Society during his time in the Dáil.

His son, Ken O'Flynn, then a city councillor, left Fianna Fáil in 2020 to unsuccessfully contest the 2020 general election, after an unsuccessful attempt to be added to the party ticket in Cork. Ken previously sought to be selected to contest the 2019 Cork North Central by-election, following the election of sitting constituency TD and party colleague Billy Kelleher to the European Parliament at the 2019 European elections. Noel supported this based on Ken topping the poll in his electoral area at the 2019 local elections. Ken had previously stated his intentions to contest a general election in 2017.

Ken O'Flynn was elected an Independent Ireland TD for Cork North-Central at the 2024 general election. Following this, Noel O'Flynn was co-opted on to Cork City Council to replace his son, joining Independent Ireland as part of this process.

Dáil	Election	Deputy (Party)	Deputy (Party)	Deputy (Party)	Deputy (Party)	Deputy (Party)
22nd	1981	Toddy O'Sullivan (Lab)	Liam Burke (FG)	Denis Lyons (FF)	Bernard Allen (FG)	Seán French (FF)
23rd	1982 (Feb)	Toddy O'Sullivan (Lab)	Liam Burke (FG)	Denis Lyons (FF)	Bernard Allen (FG)	Seán French (FF)
24th	1982 (Nov)	Toddy O'Sullivan (Lab)	Liam Burke (FG)	Denis Lyons (FF)	Bernard Allen (FG)	Dan Wallace (FF)
25th	1987	Máirín Quill (PDs)	Liam Burke (FG)	Denis Lyons (FF)	Bernard Allen (FG)	Dan Wallace (FF)
26th	1989	Máirín Quill (PDs)	Gerry O'Sullivan (Lab)	Denis Lyons (FF)	Bernard Allen (FG)	Dan Wallace (FF)
27th	1992	Máirín Quill (PDs)	Gerry O'Sullivan (Lab)	Liam Burke (FG)	Bernard Allen (FG)	Dan Wallace (FF)
27th	1994 by-election	Máirín Quill (PDs)	Kathleen Lynch (DL)	Liam Burke (FG)	Bernard Allen (FG)	Dan Wallace (FF)
28th	1997	Billy Kelleher (FF)	Noel O'Flynn (FF)	Liam Burke (FG)	Bernard Allen (FG)	Dan Wallace (FF)
29th	2002	Billy Kelleher (FF)	Noel O'Flynn (FF)	Kathleen Lynch (Lab)	Bernard Allen (FG)	Dan Wallace (FF)
30th	2007	Billy Kelleher (FF)	Noel O'Flynn (FF)	Kathleen Lynch (Lab)	Bernard Allen (FG)	4 seats from 2007
31st	2011	Billy Kelleher (FF)	Jonathan O'Brien (SF)	Kathleen Lynch (Lab)	Dara Murphy (FG)	4 seats from 2007
32nd	2016	Billy Kelleher (FF)	Jonathan O'Brien (SF)	Mick Barry (AAA–PBP)	Dara Murphy (FG)	4 seats from 2007
32nd	2019 by-election	Pádraig O'Sullivan (FF)	Jonathan O'Brien (SF)	Mick Barry (AAA–PBP)	Dara Murphy (FG)	4 seats from 2007
33rd	2020	Pádraig O'Sullivan (FF)	Thomas Gould (SF)	Mick Barry (S–PBP)	Colm Burke (FG)	4 seats from 2007
34th	2024	Pádraig O'Sullivan (FF)	Thomas Gould (SF)	Eoghan Kenny (Lab)	Colm Burke (FG)	Ken O'Flynn (II)
