= Brian Brennan (politician) =

Irish politician

Brian Brennan TD
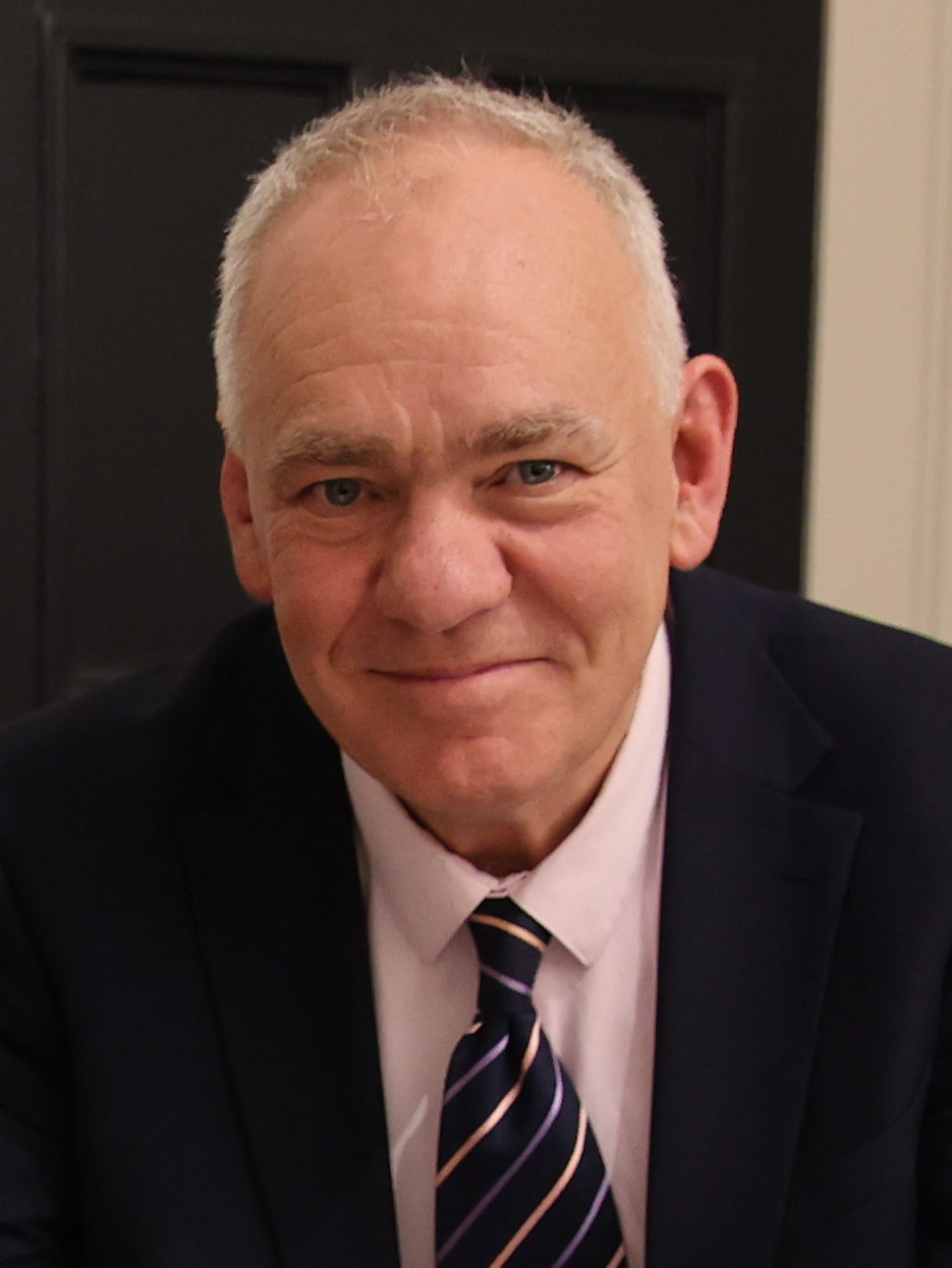
- Brennan in 2024

Teachta Dála
- Incumbent
- Assumed office November 2024
- Constituency: Wicklow–Wexford

Personal details
- Born: 1964/1965 (age 60–61)
- Party: Fine Gael
- Children: 2

Brian Brennan (born 1964/1965) is an Irish Fine Gael politician who has been a Teachta Dála (TD) for the Wicklow–Wexford constituency since the 2024 general election.

He took over from his father running a pub and restaurant in Gorey before going on to run the Arklow Bay Hotel and the Brennan Hotel Group for over 20 years. He runs a hospitality consultancy business.

Dáil	Election	Deputy (Party)	Deputy (Party)	Deputy (Party)
34th	2024	Brian Brennan (FG)	Malcolm Byrne (FF)	Fionntán Ó Súilleabháin (SF)
