= Philip Dwyer =

Irish far-right anti-immigration activist

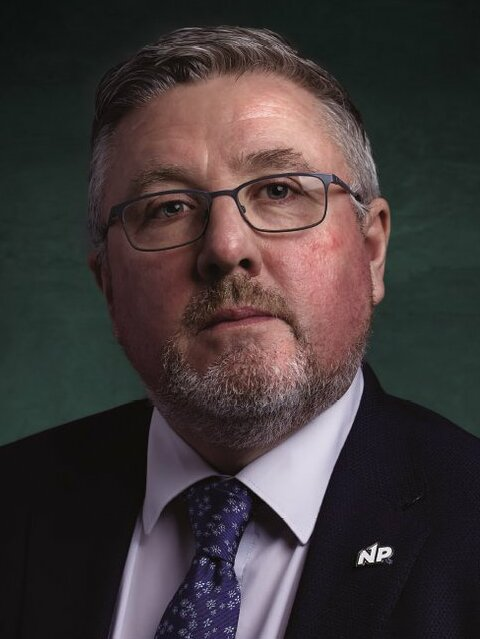
- Dwyer in 2020
- Born: 1967 or 1968 (age 58–59)
- Known for: Anti-immigration activism
- Political party: Independent
- Other political affiliations: Ireland First (c. 2023 to 2024); National Party (c. 2016 to 2022)
- Children: 3

Philip Dwyer (born 1967 or 1968) is an Irish far-right anti-immigration activist. He is a self-styled citizen journalist, and has been a regular participant and speaker at anti-immigration protests across Ireland in 2022-23. He has also campaigned against lockdowns, COVID-19 vaccines, and LGBT "ideology". He is known for confronting politicians and others on the street while filming the encounters using a selfie-stick. He has been frequently described by media sources as a propagator of misinformation.

== Activism and political candidacies ==
Dwyer stood as a candidate for the National Party in the 2020 Irish general election where he achieved 508 first-preference votes, 0.8% of the vote. Dwyer formed the "Men of Ireland Trek" in 2020 which went on hiking expeditions in Ireland.

Dwyer faced criticism when he laid a wreath from "the Men of Ireland" at the grave of Ashling Murphy, the Tullamore schoolteacher who was killed in January 2022. He then gave a speech at the graveside, saying Murphy's death had been "used as a weapon" by the government, media and NGOs to "distort the truth" about her killing. Dwyer announced he had been expelled from the National Party due to his involvement in the stunt. His departure was described in the Irish Times as part of "an internal quarrel". The Phoenix reported that Dwyer was seen as a rival to Justin Barrett's leadership of the party, having "built up a vibrant following with his live-streaming and Men of Ireland hikes". It was reported that Barrett expelled Dwyer at a party meeting in the Killeshin Hotel, Portlaoise, in February 2022. This led to "rancour" and "some resignations".

Dwyer was a participant in anti-immigration protests at East Wall, Dublin in winter 2022, where he filmed live streams warning against the "invasion of Ireland". Dwyer regularly shares reports of alleged incidents involving migrants, or the persecution of protestors, often without any evidence.

Dwyer later joined Ireland First; he first met its leader Derek Blighe on a hike on Djouce Mountain in County Wicklow, where Blighe impressed him by getting to the summit even though he was on crutches.

Attention was drawn by TheJournal.ie to Dwyer's profits generated from his activism when Blighe promoted his Telegram and YouTube channel at the anti-immigrant protests in Finglas. He makes money from PayPal, YouTube superchat and he has a Subscribestar page offering "exclusive digital content" for a monthly fee.

In March 2023, Dwyer was filmed arguing with a Muslim taxi driver and accusing the man of "hating Ireland".

In October 2023, Dwyer was involved in a confrontation during a protest in Clondalkin with People Before Profit activist Darragh Adelaide, who is a black Irish citizen. Dwyer asked Adelaide to participate in an interview, and Adelaide responded in fluent Irish. Dwyer was unable to respond in turn, instead asking if he was "sent by an NGO". The incident, captured on video, later went viral online.

Dwyer spread a false rumour on 23 November that a girl who had been stabbed prior to the Dublin riot earlier that day had died. He went to the Spire and livestreamed the riots on Twitter, making xenophobic comments.

Dwyer was the Ireland First candidate for the Dublin constituency at the 2024 European Parliament election. He was also a candidate in the Tallaght Central LEA in the 2024 South Dublin County Council election. He was not elected in either case, and was escorted out of the election count after reportedly making threatening remarks to People Before Profit members.

Dwyer contested the 2024 Irish general election in the Wicklow constituency as an independent candidate. He was eliminated on the second count, having received 437 first preference votes (0.8%) out of a valid poll of 57,071. Following his failure to be elected, Dwyer made claims of electoral fraud.

== Political views ==
Dwyer has reportedly shared more than a dozen antisemitic posts on Telegram, some claiming that Jews control the Western world, that immigration is a Jewish plot, and that "Judaism at it’s [sic] core is about the Genocide of non-Jews". TheJournal.ie said that his X account does not publish such antisemitic content but has promoted the unbanning of white nationalist Nick Fuentes, who holds antisemitic views.

In a February 2023 post about Holocaust denier David Irving, Dwyer questioned if Adolf Hitler was "the bad guy", saying "but Hollywood told me Hitler was the bad guy? Where [sic] they lying to us?"

== Legal issues ==
In May 1998, Dwyer appeared in court after breaking an opposing player's jaw during a game of hurling. He paid compensation to the victim and was released in line with the probation act.

In May 2010 Dwyer was fired from his job as a postman with An Post for "dereliction of duty and for failing to comply with their instructions" after several instances in which he had kicked dogs including kicking one in the head with a steel-capped boot, threatened a woman that he would shoot her dog dead, and failed to comply with instructions. Dwyer appealed the matter before a labour court in September 2012. The tribunal ruled against Dwyer.

On 14 March 2023, Dwyer was brought before Tallaght District Court in Dublin, and was charged with engaging in threatening, abusive or insulting behaviour at a children's crèche on the Grange Road, Dublin 16 on 30 June 2021. Dwyer accused the crèche of promoting "LGBT Ideology" after spotting a poster featuring a rainbow in the window. The owner testified that Dwyer approached her while filming her on a smart phone and he stated the rainbow represented homosexuals and that "homosexuals are paedophiles" and she was therefore "indoctrinating four-year-olds to welcome paedophiles into their life". Giving evidence in his own defence, Dwyer stated that he was delivering a package while working as a courier for Pony Express when he noticed the flag, and approached the crèche in a his capacity as a citizen journalist in order to have a robust conversation, however he strongly denied using the word "paedophilia" and disagreed that his behaviour caused a breach of the peace. On 19 September 2024, Judge Patricia McNamara dismissed the charges against Dwyer, ruling that the threshold for a guilty verdict had not been met.

In 2024, following comments by Paul Murphy in the Dáil, Dwyer complained that these comments were “outrageous and libellous”. However, the Committee on Parliamentary Privileges and Oversight found that there was not a significant risk that his reputation had been adversely affected.

On 15 July 2024 he was arrested in connection with a public order incident in Coolock. He was released on conditional bail, which included agreeing to stay away from the former Crown Paint factory in Coolock. In February 2025, he was convicted of failing to follow a garda's direction to leave the area; he was fined €500 and given a two-month suspended sentence. The judge in the case stated that the accused was "not protected by the claim of being a journalist, or a citizen journalist, or a credited journalist, or a judge or a priest or whatever, you are still subject to the rigours of section 8 of the Public Order Act". At the time of the case, Dwyer was described as a trainee journalist with sporadic income of €500 a year and was reliant on social welfare.

In November 2024, Gardaí began investigating Dwyer for allegedly assaulting a 66-year-old disabled pensioner, the father of Wicklow's People Before Profit candidate Kellie McConnell, in Bray, County Wicklow. Dwyer, seen in a video brandishing an extendable baton, allegedly pushed the man to the ground and produced the baton. In August 2025, Dwyer appeared before Bray District Court and was charged with affray. In February 2026, he was found guilty and given a three-month prison sentence, suspended for twelve months, and a fine of €750.

In March 2025, a judge convicted Dwyer of trespassing at a direct provision centre at Magowna House in Inch, County Clare in May 2023. A staff member testified that Dwyer was "making me and my staff feel afraid and unsafe". The judge imposed a €500 fine. He appealed the conviction to the circuit court, but his conviction was upheld.

== Personal life ==
In 2020, Dwyer was described on the National Party's website as "a property manager from Tallaght" and "father of three". As of early 2025, Dwyer was not employed. While the National Party's website described him as "deeply committed to promoting Irish culture and heritage", a number of outlets noted the irony of Dwyer's inability to speak Irish.
