= Garret Kelleher =

Irish politician

Senator Garret Kelleher
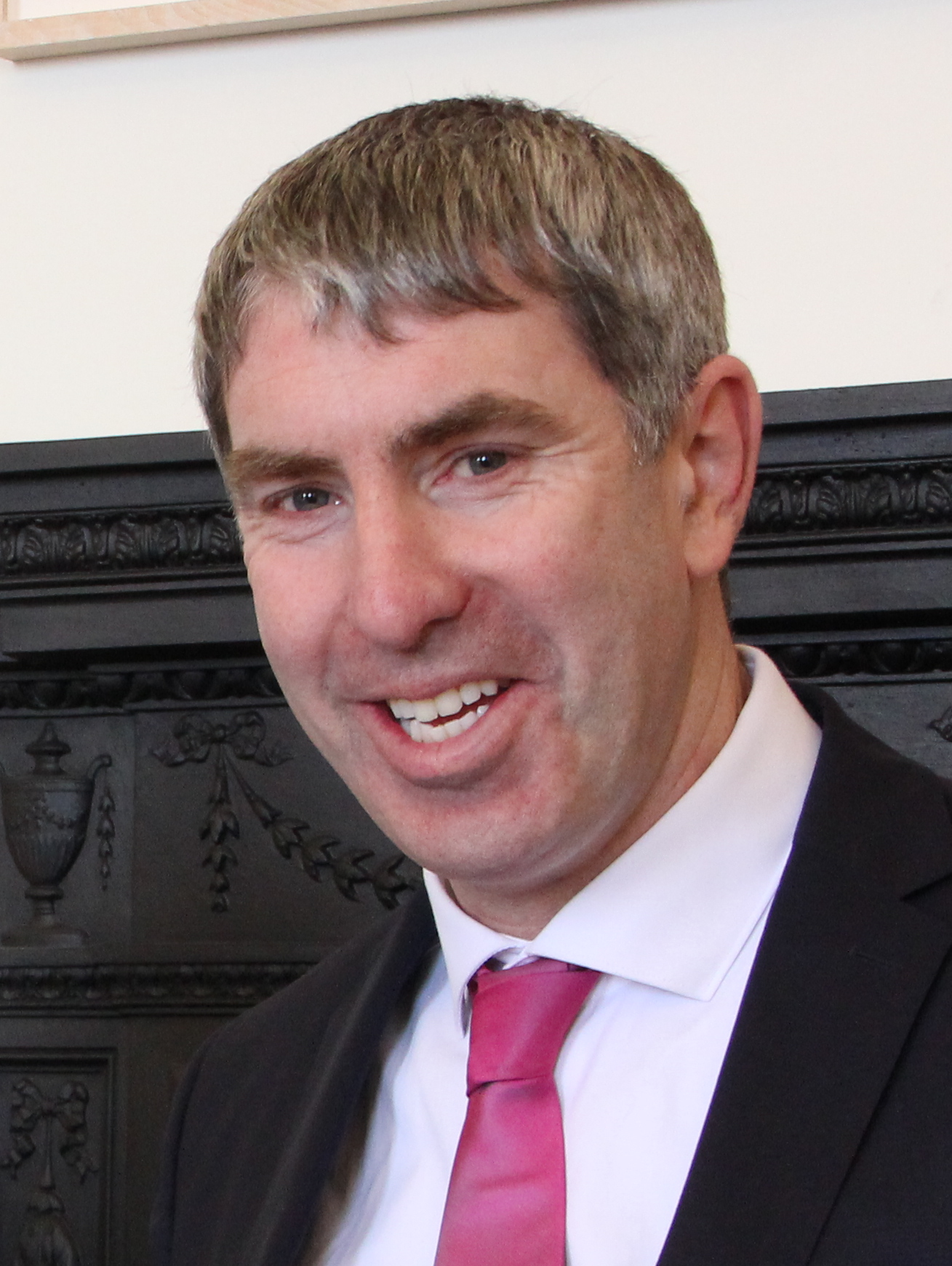
- Kelleher in 2025

Senator
- Incumbent
- Assumed office January 2025
- Constituency: Industrial and Commercial Panel

Personal details
- Born: Cork, Ireland
- Party: Fine Gael
- Spouse: Leona Kelleher
- Children: 4
- Education: University College Cork

Garret Kelleher is an Irish Fine Gael politician who has been a senator for the Industrial and Commercial Panel since January 2025.

== Early and personal life ==
He is a graduate of University College Cork. He lives in Ballincollig with his wife Leona, and their four children.

== Political career ==
He was a member of Cork City Council for the Cork City South West area from May 2019 to January 2025. He was an unsuccessful candidate for the Cork North-Central constituency at the 2024 general election.
