= National Alliance (Ireland) =

Alliance of Irish political parties

National Alliance Comhaontas Náisiúnta
- Leaders: Derek Blighe; Patrick Quinlan; Anthony Cahill
- Founded: July 2024
- Dissolved: February 2025
- Ideology: Nationalism; Anti-immigration
- Political position: Far-right
- Members: National Party; Ireland First; The Irish People

The National Alliance was an electoral alliance in the Republic of Ireland formed to contest the 2024 Irish general election. It consisted of three far-right and nationalist political parties: the National Party, Ireland First and The Irish People. Some independent candidates were also included in the alliance. In February 2025, a post from the National Party stated that the alliance was defunct.

== History ==
The National Alliance was established in July 2024 after small far-right parties failed to achieve success in that year's European and local elections, attributed by some sources to "infighting" and "vote splitting".

The stated goal of the group was to ensure votes for far-right parties were not split in the 2024 general election. The group stated that, besides the National Party, Ireland First and The Irish People, other parties were also involved in discussions to join, but they had been "not willing to make the concessions ... needed to make the alliance work". These included the Irish Freedom Party and Liberty Republic (formerly Direct Democracy Ireland).

The group was not a registered political party and its name did not appear on ballot papers. The leader of the far-right Irish Freedom Party, Hermann Kelly, said that this was one of the reasons his party did not join the National Alliance. In September 2024, the Electoral Commission rejected an effort to change the name of The Irish People party to "National Alliance". The body ruled that it was "not an application to amend the name and emblem of an existing party, but rather constitutes an application to seek to register an alliance of a number of already registered political parties", which the Electoral Reform Act 2022 forbids.

Parties comprising the National Alliance nominated a total of 32 candidates in the 2024 general election. None were elected.

In February 2025, the National Party announced that the National Alliance was "considered de facto defunct" due to a lack of "significant communication and dialogue" between members.

== Organisation and ideology ==
As of October 2024, the group's election committee included Derek Blighe of Ireland First, Fingal County Council member Patrick Quinlan of the National Party and Anthony Cahill of The Irish People.

The alliance was described as anti-immigrant and as having far-right views on immigration. Some of the alliance's stated principles included "Ireland belongs to the Irish", "We have no other home, if there are no Irish, there is no Ireland" and "House the Irish, not the world". Other positions the group outlined included opposition to abortion, defending "the right to free speech", and cutting funding to "subversive NGOs that undermine [Ireland's] national interests".

== Election results ==
Election	Party	Leader	1st pref. votes	%	Seats	±
2024	The Irish People	Anthony Cahill	7,626	0.35 (#11)	0	New
2024	National Party	Disputed	6,511	0.30 (#13)	0	Steady
2024	Ireland First	Derek Blighe	3,339	0.15 (#15)	0	New

== See also ==
- Nationalist Alliance (UK)
