= Party for Animal Welfare =

Irish political party

- Founded: December 2018
- Ideology: Animal welfare Anti-blood sport

Website
- ipaw.ie

The Party for Animal Welfare (PAW) is a minor political party in Ireland, with a focus on animal welfare. It has no representation at local or national level.

== Policies and activities ==
The party advocates for the banning of blood sports, puppy farms, factory farming, greyhound racing and other perceived animal cruelties. They have petitioned for the adding of animal welfare to the Irish primary school curriculum.

The Party for Animal Welfare held a protest in Dingle, County Kerry during February 2020 to oppose a proposed seal cull, which local fishermen had been calling for to increase fish stocks. In conjunction with Compassion in World Farming Ireland, the party held protests against the export of live animals outside Leinster House and Rosslare Europort in 2019 and 2020.

== Elections ==
In the 2020 Irish general election, before the party had registered, PAW's deputy leader Ted Cronin ran as an independent on an animal welfare platform. He received 391 (0.5%) first preference votes, in the Kerry constituency, coming second last.

The party also fielded five candidates in the 2024 local elections, one in the 2024 Limerick mayoral election, and three in the 2024 general election. None were elected.

Gerben Uunk, a co-founder of the party, reportedly sought nominations from a number of local councils to be a candidate in the 2025 Irish presidential election.

== Affiliation ==
PAW is a member of the Animal Politics Foundation. Although not an official member, the Animal Politics EU group has recognised the Party for Animal Welfare and members of the group have expressed support for them.

== Election results ==
=== Dáil Éireann ===
Election	1st pref votes	%	Seats	+/–	Government
2024	884	0.04 (#20)	0 / 174	New	Extra-parliamentary
