= Lorna Bogue =

Irish politician

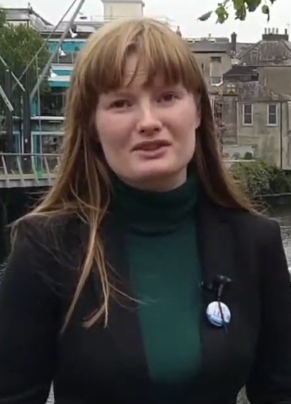
- Bogue in 2017

Leader of Rabharta
- Incumbent
- Assumed office November 2021
- Preceded by: Position established

Cork City Councillor
- In office June 2019 – June 2024
- Constituency: Cork South East

Personal details
- Party: Rabharta (2021–present)
- Other political affiliations: Green Party (2014 to 2020)
- Education: University of Limerick

Lorna Bogue is an Irish politician and co-founder of the eco-socialist party An Rabharta Glas. She was previously a member of the Green Party. She served on the Cork City Council for the South-East local electoral area between 2019 and 2024.

== Early life ==
Bogue is from Limerick. She graduated with a Bachelor of Arts (BA) in Irish Music and Dance in 2014 and a Master of Science (MSc) in Economic Analysis in 2019, both from the University of Limerick.

== Career ==
=== Green Party ===
Bogue began her political career as a member of the Green Party in Ireland, which she joined in 2014. Bogue stated her motivation for entering politics was because she was "tired of middle-aged men pissing away my future all the time".

In 2018 Bogue spearheaded the Green party's campaign for a Yes vote in Cork in the 2018 referendum on abortion.

She was elected to the Cork City Council for the South-East ward during the May 2019 election.

=== An Rabharta Glas ===
Bogue resigned from the Green Party in October 2020 following controversies within the party, including its handling of the Mother and Baby Homes records and broader dissatisfaction with its leadership and approach to internal criticism. She cited concerns over misogyny within the party and expressed disappointment in the lack of institutional change, leading to her decision to continue her role as a councillor as an independent.

In 2021, Bogue co-founded An Rabharta Glas (The Green Tidal Wave), an eco-socialist political party formed by former Green Party members dissatisfied with its coalition decisions. She articulated the party's agenda to transform Ireland into an eco-socialist state, emphasizing state intervention in markets and environmental sustainability. In November 2021, she was elected as party leader at the party's inaugural AGM.

In April 2022, The Phoenix magazine reported that the creation of a women's caucus on Cork City Council faced resistance from male councillors, with accusations of sexist language being used in debates. Fianna Fáil party councillor Terry Shannon caused controversy by advising women not to get "uppity" about gender balance on committees. Solidarity party councillor Fiona Ryan criticised Shannon's language, while Bogue expressed frustration, noting that the women's caucus had to report to an all-male corporate policy group. Bogue stated, "when it comes to gender equality, I'm very uppity". The tensions heightened when Green Party councillor Colette Finn accused Fine Gael party leader Des Cahill of using "concretely sexist language" after referring to Bogue's reaction as "hysterical". Bogue also described some male councillors' behaviour as resembling a boys' club and called for Cahill to withdraw his remark. In response, Lord Mayor Colm Kelleher facilitated a peace meeting with the women's caucus, and discussions arose about bringing in a human resources facilitator to address the issue of inappropriate language.

In January 2024 Bogue sparked controversy after posting a photo on Twitter of a garda (police officer) outside a McDonald's restaurant during a pro-Palestinian rally. Bogue criticised the Garda presence, alleging they were prioritising private business over public safety. The Association of Garda Sergeants and Inspectors condemned her remarks, asserting that the garda in the photo was simply monitoring the protest. General Secretary Antoinette Cunningham described Bogue's remarks as false and harmful. Cunningham stated that the garda in the photograph was lawfully performing his role of monitoring the protest, not acting as private security. Garda sources expressed frustration, accusing Bogue of jumping to conclusions and undermining frontline officers' work. Bogue defended her comments, stating that her criticism was aimed at Garda leadership's operational decisions, not individual officers, and highlighted a perceived prioritisation of property protection over addressing public safety concerns.

In 2024, Bogue announced that she would stand in the 2024 European Parliament election in Ireland in the South constituency. She focused her campaign on providing political representation for workers and carers and addressing community-level concerns. Bogue was not successful.

Bogue lost her local council seat at the 2024 Cork City Council election, which coincided with the European elections. She contested the 2024 general election in Cork South-Central, being eliminated on the sixth count.
