= Derek Blighe =

Irish political activist (born 1980)

- Born: 1980 (age 45–46); Rylane, County Cork, Ireland
- Known for: Anti-immigration activism; former chairperson of "Ireland First" political party
- Other political affiliations: Ireland First (2023–2025); National Alliance (2024)

Derek Blighe (born 1980) is an Irish far-right anti-immigration political activist. A construction worker by trade, Blighe was an economic migrant to Canada during the post-2008 Irish economic downturn. Following his return to Ireland in 2019, Blighe became politically active during the Irish anti-immigration protests, in which he acted as a self-described "citizen journalist". This involved him attending, filming and promoting anti-immigration protests across Ireland. As part of this activism, Blighe has promoted the great replacement conspiracy theory as explaining the basis for immigration into Ireland. In 2023, he became the leader of a registered political party Ireland First, with anti-immigration as the main plank of its platform. In April 2025, Blighe announced he had quit the Ireland First party and said he wanted to “resume other ambitions” and “cannot be involved in party politics at the moment”.

== Background ==
Blighe was born in 1980 in Rylane, a small village approximately 30 km north-west of Cork City. His father, Denis Blighe, was a trade unionist and supporter of the socialist politician Joe Sherlock, a member of the Workers' Party and later the Democratic Left. In 2001 Denis Blighe was active in defending refugees from criticism; he wrote a number of letters to the Irish Examiner expressing the view that refugees were "working in non-union jobs, are being exploited by low wages" and "Refugees find it difficult to find accommodation. People tell them to come and see the property and say they will call them back, but the phone never rings. Some landlords seem to have a problem with them".

After leaving secondary school, Blighe became a bricklayer. Following the collapse of the Celtic Tiger in the late 2000s, Blighe emigrated to Calgary in Alberta, Canada.

== Activism ==
Following his return to Ireland in 2019, Blighe became active online and began professing conspiratorial views, such as endorsing the conspiracy that a "great replacement" is occurring in Ireland. Blighe suggested that the government is purposefully replacing native Irish people with immigrants from Africa and the Middle East.

Blighe became politically active in the spring of 2022, filming videos initially with an anti-lockdown focus before pivoting to anti-immigration as his main topic; targeting the arrival of Ukrainian refugees fleeing the Russian invasion of Ukraine. These videos soon brought him into contact with members of the Irish far-right, such as former National Party member Philip Dwyer. In August 2022, Blighe was amongst a number of protesters who taunted and jeered the Taoiseach Micheál Martin and Tánaiste Leo Varadkar during their commemoration of Michael Collins at Béal na Bláth.

In the latter half of 2022, Blighe attended and led anti-immigration protests in counties Dublin, Wicklow, Kerry, Waterford, and Cork. During this time period, he also began assembling an organisation known as "Ireland First", which organised through secret Telegram groups. Both The Irish Times and The Guardian have described Blighe using the Ireland First telegram channel to radicalise his supporters with extremist language. The Phoenix has reported that in 2022 Blighe shared a number of messages from British Neo-Nazi Mark Collett to the Ireland First Telegram channel. In early 2023, Ireland First registered as a political party with Electoral Commission, with a website promoting Blighe as their leader.

Blighe was the Ireland First candidate for the South constituency at the 2024 European Parliament election, with Philip Dwyer and Margaret Maguire standing in the Dublin and Midlands–North-West constituencies respectively. None of the Ireland First candidates, including Blighe, were elected in the 2024 local elections or European elections.

In April 2025, Blighe quit the Ireland First party and stated he was removing himself from party and electoral politics.

== Views ==
Blighe has stated Ireland is being "assaulted" by "unvettable fake refugees". He has referred to immigration as a "plantation" (in reference to the Plantations of Ireland), and linked migration to rape and violence. Blighe has spread false claims that children would be sharing buildings with refugees, something the Department of Integration later clarified was categorically false. He has posted videos suggesting minister for justice, Helen McEntee, should be "put back in the kitchen", calling her a "misandrist".

In 2022 Blighe regularly claimed the Russian invasion of Ukraine was a "fake war publicised to encourage economic migrants to come to this country".

== Misinformation ==
In May 2023, the head of the Presentation Brothers in Ireland, Brother Barry Noel, condemned Blighe after Blighe falsely spread a claim that several black men in Cork City were migrants "planted" by the government. The men referred to by Blighe were, in actuality, six members of the religious order from West Africa visiting their Irish counterparts during a conference. Cork North Central TD Mick Barry commented that the affair was a "ham-fisted attempt to stir up racial suspicion fell flat on its face, but the farce had a sinister edge — an attempt to promote the view that the mere sighting of black men is cause for alarm".

In June 2023, the Garda Síochana issued a statement countering Blighe after Blighe stated online it was "100% confirmed" that an 11-year-old girl had almost been kidnapped by a "foreign man" in Kenmare, County Kerry. The Garda press office stated that while a report had been made on 6 June of a suspicious adult male, none of the other details given by Blighe were accurate. One source within the Gardaí told TheJournal.ie that CCTV evidence seemed to suggest that no incident had occurred at all, much less one involving a "foreign man".

On 23 November 2023, during the 2023 Dublin riot, Blighe shared misinformation (in a YouTube video of an anti-immigrant protest in Fermoy) claiming that a girl who had been stabbed in Dublin earlier that day had died.

== Convictions and legal issues ==
Blighe has nine criminal convictions, including one for public order offences.

In September 2022, Blighe filmed himself stealing clothes from a shelter for Ukrainian refugees. He was brought to court and charged with theft in March 2023, applying to have the court case struck out because of "personal difficulties" it was causing for him. The incident caused Blighe to lose his licence for possession of two firearms. He was convicted of the theft on 14 June 2023. Blighe lodged an appeal against the conviction, but withdrew it in October 2024.

He was sued in March 2024 in the High Court along with his party by a businessman from Fermoy for alleged defamation.

In November 2024, Blighe was found guilty of threatening and abusive behaviour against a hotel manager. He was given the option of the probation act, but after refusing to make a donation to the Irish Refugee Council, he was convicted and fined €400.

In September 2025, Blighe was charged with harassing a member of An Garda Síochána.

== Personal life ==
While living in Canada, Blighe met and married a Canadian woman. She emigrated to Ireland with him and their children in 2019.

While Blighe's father was a trade unionist and supporter of the left-wing Democratic Left TD Joe Sherlock, other members of Blighe's family have reportedly expressed right-wing and anti-immigrant views. His half sister was named in an injunction for alleged involvement in protests at a housing development in County Cork, which protestors inaccurately believed were intended to house refugees fleeing Russia's invasion of Ukraine.
