= Ken O'Flynn =

Irish politician

Ken O'Flynn TD
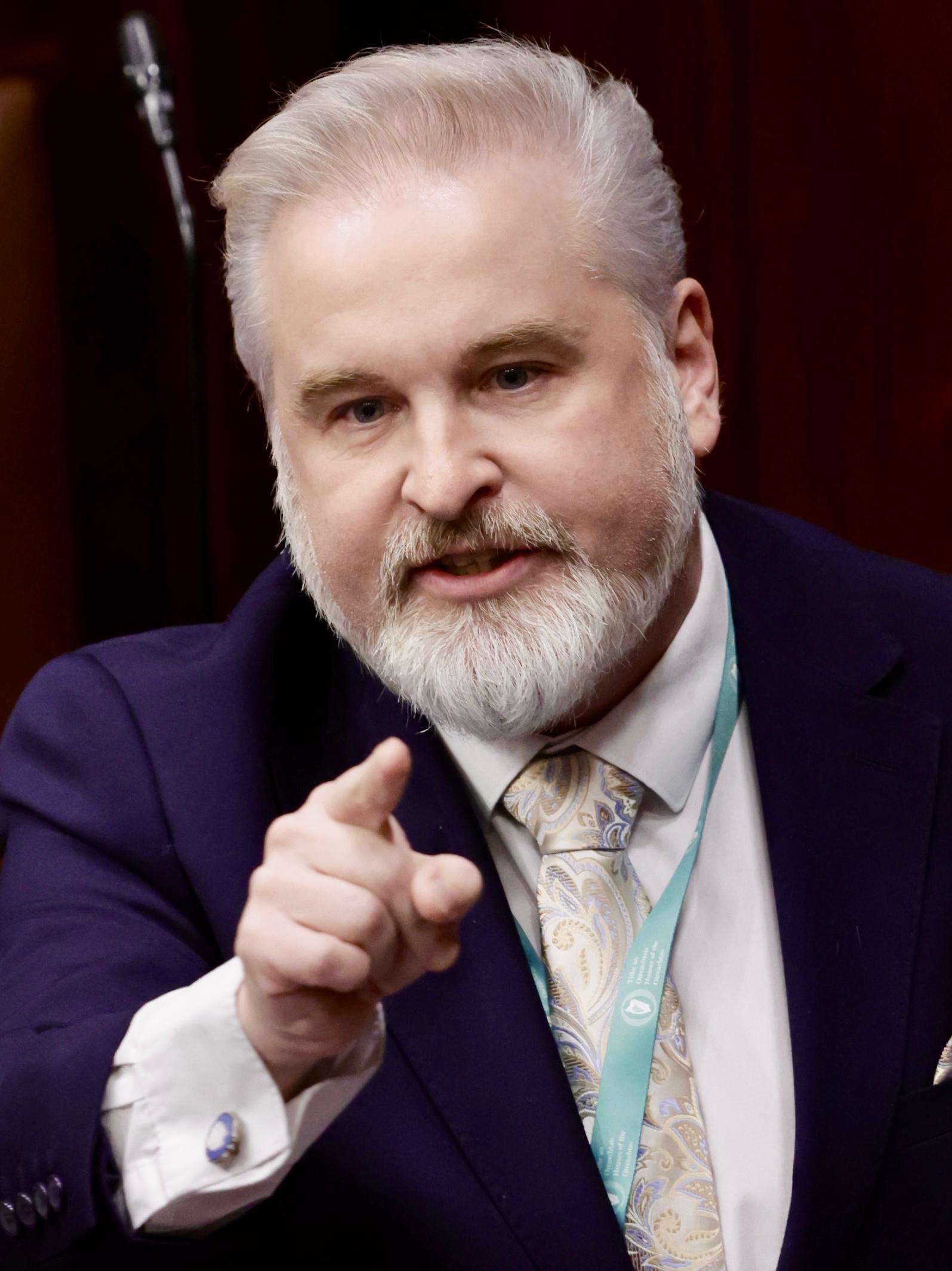
- O'Flynn in 2025

Teachta Dála
- Incumbent
- Assumed office November 2024
- Constituency: Cork North-Central

Chairperson of Independent Ireland
- Incumbent
- Assumed office 12 July 2024
- Leader: Michael Collins
- Preceded by: Elaine Mullally

Personal details
- Born: 1978/1979 (age 46–47) Cork, Ireland
- Party: Independent Ireland
- Other political affiliations: Independent (2020–2024); Fianna Fáil (until 2020)
- Spouse: Francisco Cuevas (m. 2022)
- Parent: Noel O'Flynn (father)
- Relatives: Gary O'Flynn (brother)

Kenneth Noel O'Flynn (born 1978/1979) is an Irish Independent Ireland politician who has been a Teachta Dála (TD) for the Cork North-Central constituency since the 2024 general election. O'Flynn was previously a member of Cork City Council between 2008 and 2024.

== Career ==
=== Local politics ===
==== Fianna Fáil (2008–2020) ====
O'Flynn became a Fianna Fáil councillor in 2008 after being co-opted, when his brother Gary O'Flynn resigned. In June 2017, O'Flynn revealed that he owned 42 flats in London's Docklands as part of his annual declaration of interests. O'Flynn's assets also included properties in Ireland and Spain, such as six business units in Marbella, an apartment in Limerick, a house in Dublin, and various business premises in Cork, including locations on the Mallow Road, Mahon, and Kilnap. O'Flynn declined to comment further on the details. A report from RTÉ's investigations unit from the previous year noted that O'Flynn, along with other councillors, had omitted properties from his ethics declaration, including some of the same ones listed in his 2017 declaration.

==== Independent (2020–2024) ====
Ken O'Flynn remained with Fianna Fáil for 16 years until his resignation in January 2020. O'Flynn quit Fianna Fáil after the party did not select him to run in the Cork North-Central constituency at the 2020 Irish general election. O'Flynn instead ran as an independent candidate and missed out on a seat, losing in the last count to Mick Barry.

In August 2021, O'Flynn faced criticism for a misleading Facebook post in which he called for "checks and balances" on refugees fleeing Afghanistan amidst the Taliban's resurgence. The post included a photograph of a plane crowded with Afghan men, which O'Flynn claimed depicted a "flight coming in from Afghanistan." However, the image was later revealed to have been taken in 2018 and was related to Afghan deportees from Turkey, not recent refugee arrivals. While admitting the error was "an honest mistake", O'Flynn defended his stance on asylum security, and dismissed critics as "snowflakes." The image had previously also been shared with similar commentary by former Breitbart contributor Dave Atherton, suggesting it influenced O'Flynn's post.

==== Independent Ireland ====
Following a period as an independent, O'Flynn joined Independent Ireland in March 2024.

In May 2024 O'Flynn was one of three city councillors to vote against a €18m Traveller housing scheme for the Spring Lane halting site in Ballyvolane. In September 2024, O'Flynn faced a Standards in Public Office Commission (SIPO) hearing over comments about the Spring Lane halting site made during a 2021 interview on RedFM's Neil Prendeville Show. The complaint alleged breaches of the Local Government Act and the Councillors' Code of Conduct. O'Flynn pledged to participate, asserting he would "not be silenced". A prior complaint by the Traveller Equality and Justice Project about his remarks was dismissed by the council's ethics registrar. Separately, the Broadcasting Authority of Ireland (BAI) partially upheld a complaint against the RedFM segment in 2022, criticising its failure to challenge O'Flynn's views or provide diverse perspectives, deeming it stigmatising toward Spring Lane residents and Travellers.

In May 2024, an investigation by the Echo found that O'Flynn had the lowest attendance of any Cork County Councillor between 2019 and 2023 and that O'Flynn's attendance was so low he was not eligible to make full expenses claims. O'Flynn defended his record by noting he ran a business and was also busy "listening to constituents".

Following his re-election to Cork City Council in June 2024, O'Flynn expressed his concerns about immigration, advocating for stricter controls on people coming into Ireland. He described immigration as a "serious problem" for the country. O'Flynn stated that while he did not oppose foreign people coming to Ireland, he was critical of individuals entering the country without proper documentation, such as those who "tear up their passports." O'Flynn suggest that a government that was not able to fix the homeless crisis would not be able to take in large numbers of immigrants. O'Flynn distanced himself from far-right views on the issue, stating his approach was just "common sense".

In November 2024, O'Flynn was elected to the Dáil, and afterwards, he co-opted his local council seat to his 73-year-old retired father, Noel. Noel O'Flynn joined Independent Ireland as part of the process.

In February 2025, O'Flynn stated that Ireland had taken in asylum seekers "to the detriment of our own people" and claimed that "hotel rooms can be found overnight for asylum seekers" but not for Irish citizens.

In June 2026, O'Flynn was reported to have submitted an extremely high number of parliamentary questions to the Department of Health, with concerns raised that they were being generated using AI. The allegations arose after concerns were raised within the government that the unusually high volume of questions submitted in his name, particularly on mental health, was placing a significant administrative burden on the health service and requiring clinicians to spend time preparing responses. O'Flynn defended his actions and did not deny the use of AI, arguing instead that the key issue was whether the questions were accurate and legitimate. He stated that he personally reviewed and approved every parliamentary question submitted in his name and said he had long relied on assistive technologies because of his dyslexia.

== Political views ==
O'Flynn has been classified as ideologically a member of populist right in Ireland. A member of the right-wing Independent Ireland party, O'Flynn has frequently expressed anti-immigration views.

O'Flynn advocates that Ireland should be a neutral, isolationist country which does not get "involved in conflicts that are not our own." O'Flynn has stated concerning Israel/Palestine that he is in favour of neither side.

Although identifying as a gay man, O'Flynn does not consider himself a member of the LGBT community and actively campaigns against LGBT causes, transgender causes in particular. On 24 June 2026, during pride month, several LGBT TDs rose to note the positive contributions the LGBT movement had made on their lives. During O'Flynn's contribution, he praised the historic gay movement but criticised the modern LGBT movement, arguing that it had been "hijacked", was too inclusive, had lost sight of its original purpose, and was increasingly focused on symbolic issues rather than protecting gay, lesbian and bisexual people from discrimination and violence.

O'Flynn also campaigns against NGOs in Ireland, and has remarked that "At one stage, there were more suicide charities in this country than there were suicides. It might sound funny but it’s not".

== Personal life ==
O'Flynn is the son of Noel O'Flynn, a TD for the same constituency from 1997 to 2011. O'Flynn is a gay man and is married to Francisco Cuevas, a Spanish business analyst who is the son of the Duke of Lora del Rio.

Dáil	Election	Deputy (Party)	Deputy (Party)	Deputy (Party)	Deputy (Party)	Deputy (Party)
22nd	1981	Toddy O'Sullivan (Lab)	Liam Burke (FG)	Denis Lyons (FF)	Bernard Allen (FG)	Seán French (FF)
23rd	1982 (Feb)	Toddy O'Sullivan (Lab)	Liam Burke (FG)	Denis Lyons (FF)	Bernard Allen (FG)	Seán French (FF)
24th	1982 (Nov)	Toddy O'Sullivan (Lab)	Liam Burke (FG)	Denis Lyons (FF)	Bernard Allen (FG)	Dan Wallace (FF)
25th	1987	Máirín Quill (PDs)	Liam Burke (FG)	Denis Lyons (FF)	Bernard Allen (FG)	Dan Wallace (FF)
26th	1989	Máirín Quill (PDs)	Gerry O'Sullivan (Lab)	Denis Lyons (FF)	Bernard Allen (FG)	Dan Wallace (FF)
27th	1992	Máirín Quill (PDs)	Gerry O'Sullivan (Lab)	Liam Burke (FG)	Bernard Allen (FG)	Dan Wallace (FF)
27th	1994 by-election	Máirín Quill (PDs)	Kathleen Lynch (DL)	Liam Burke (FG)	Bernard Allen (FG)	Dan Wallace (FF)
28th	1997	Billy Kelleher (FF)	Noel O'Flynn (FF)	Liam Burke (FG)	Bernard Allen (FG)	Dan Wallace (FF)
29th	2002	Billy Kelleher (FF)	Noel O'Flynn (FF)	Kathleen Lynch (Lab)	Bernard Allen (FG)	Dan Wallace (FF)
30th	2007	Billy Kelleher (FF)	Noel O'Flynn (FF)	Kathleen Lynch (Lab)	Bernard Allen (FG)	4 seats from 2007
31st	2011	Billy Kelleher (FF)	Jonathan O'Brien (SF)	Kathleen Lynch (Lab)	Dara Murphy (FG)	4 seats from 2007
32nd	2016	Billy Kelleher (FF)	Jonathan O'Brien (SF)	Mick Barry (AAA–PBP)	Dara Murphy (FG)	4 seats from 2007
32nd	2019 by-election	Pádraig O'Sullivan (FF)	Jonathan O'Brien (SF)	Mick Barry (AAA–PBP)	Dara Murphy (FG)	4 seats from 2007
33rd	2020	Pádraig O'Sullivan (FF)	Thomas Gould (SF)	Mick Barry (S–PBP)	Colm Burke (FG)	4 seats from 2007
34th	2024	Pádraig O'Sullivan (FF)	Thomas Gould (SF)	Eoghan Kenny (Lab)	Colm Burke (FG)	Ken O'Flynn (II)
