= Rabharta =

Irish political party

- Leader: Lorna Bogue
- Founders: Lorna Bogue; Liam Sinclair
- Founded: 5 June 2021
- Split from: Green Party
- Ideology: Eco-socialism; Reformism; Just transition
- Political position: Left-wing
- Colours: Shades of green
- Slogan: Comhshaol agus Comhionannas ('Environment and Equality')

Website
- rabharta.ie

Rabharta (Irish: [ˈɾˠəuɾˠt̪ˠə], lit. 'spring tide/wave'), previously An Rabharta Glas – Green Left, is a minor Irish political party, launched on 5 June 2021 by former members of the Green Party. At launch, it had two councillors, who had previously been elected as Green Party members — Lorna Bogue, on Cork City Council, and Liam Sinclair, on South Dublin County Council. As of December 2024, it has no elected representation. Its outlook has been described as "eco-socialist".

== Ideology and policies ==
Rabharta is a left-wing green party, described as "eco-socialist". Its mission statement is to "reconstruct the political system so that it serves people and nature, not profit and extraction". The party has stated it favours state intervention in the economy to protect against "vested interests". In terms of food production, the party has been described as favouring "decorporation" and decarbonisation.

== History ==
The party was launched on 5 June 2021 as 'An Rabharta Glas – Green Left'. It was formed by former members of the Green Party, who had resigned in protest over various issues in 2020 and 2021, including the handling of the Mother and Baby Homes Commission of Investigation report by Roderic O'Gorman as Minister for Children, Equality, Disability, Integration and Youth, and disagreement over the programme for government.

It was reported to have approximately 30 members on launch, and Lorna Bogue was elected as party leader at the party's inaugural AGM.

At launch, it had two councillors, who had previously been elected as Green Party members — Lorna Bogue, on Cork City Council, and Liam Sinclair, on South Dublin County Council. As of June 2024, it has no elected representation. Its outlook has been described as "eco-socialist".

In May 2023, Bogue announced her candidacy for the 2024 European Parliament election as the party's candidate in the constituency of South.

In November 2023, the party's councillor on South Dublin County Council, Liam Sinclair, resigned his seat due to employment circumstances. This reduced the party's representation on local government to one seat as the Green Party had the right to co-opt a replacement for Sinclair, as he had originally been elected as Green Party candidate.

In April 2024, the Electoral Commission proposed to register Rabharta as a party to contest local elections across the state and European Parliament elections in the constituencies of Dublin and South. This decision was subject to a 21-day appeal period, and was not in force for the local, European and Limerick mayoral elections in June 2024.

In June 2024, a number of party's candidates contested the local elections, European elections and Limerick mayoral election. Bogue was not re-elected to Cork City Council and was eliminated at the ninth count in the European elections for Ireland South. As none of Rabharta's other candidates were successful, the party was left with no elected representation.

Three party candidates ran in the 2024 general election. None were elected.

== Election results ==
=== Dáil Éireann ===
Election	Leader	1st pref Votes	%	Seats	+/−	Government
2024	Lorna Bogue	626	0.03 (#19)	0 / 174	New	Extra-parliamentary

=== European Parliament ===
Election	Leader	1st pref Votes	%	Seats	+/−	EP Group
2024	Lorna Bogue	11,302	0.65 (#13)	0 / 14	New	−
