= 1998 Cork South-Central by-election =

By-election to the 28th Dáil

- 23 October 1998
- Turnout: 43,007 (49.1%)
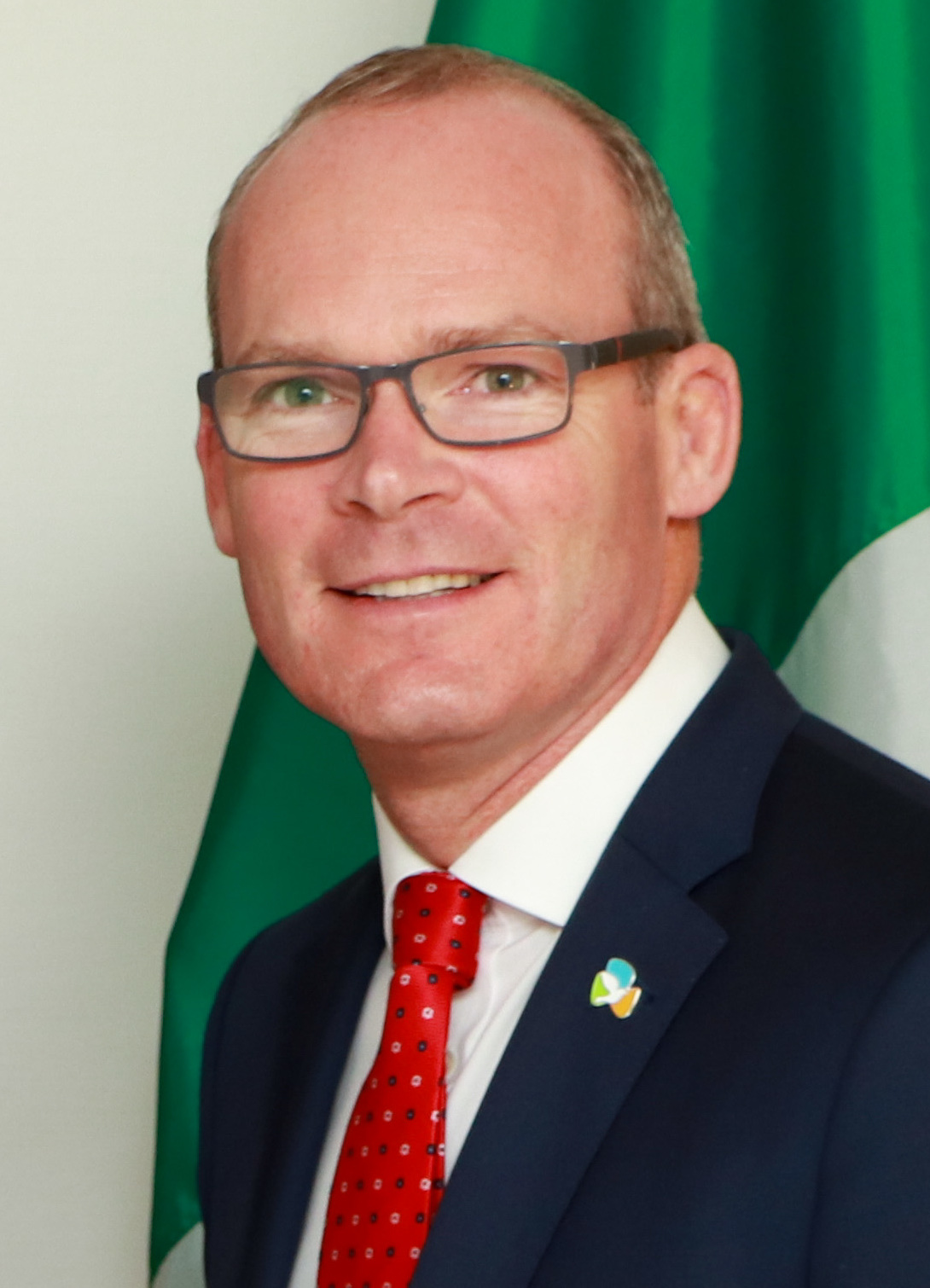
		Behan	O'Sullivan
Nominee	Simon Coveney	Sinead Behan	Toddy O'Sullivan
Party	Fine Gael	Fianna Fáil	Labour
First preferences	16,212	12,658	8,171
Percentage	37.7%	29.4%	19.0%
Final count	23,230	16,379	–
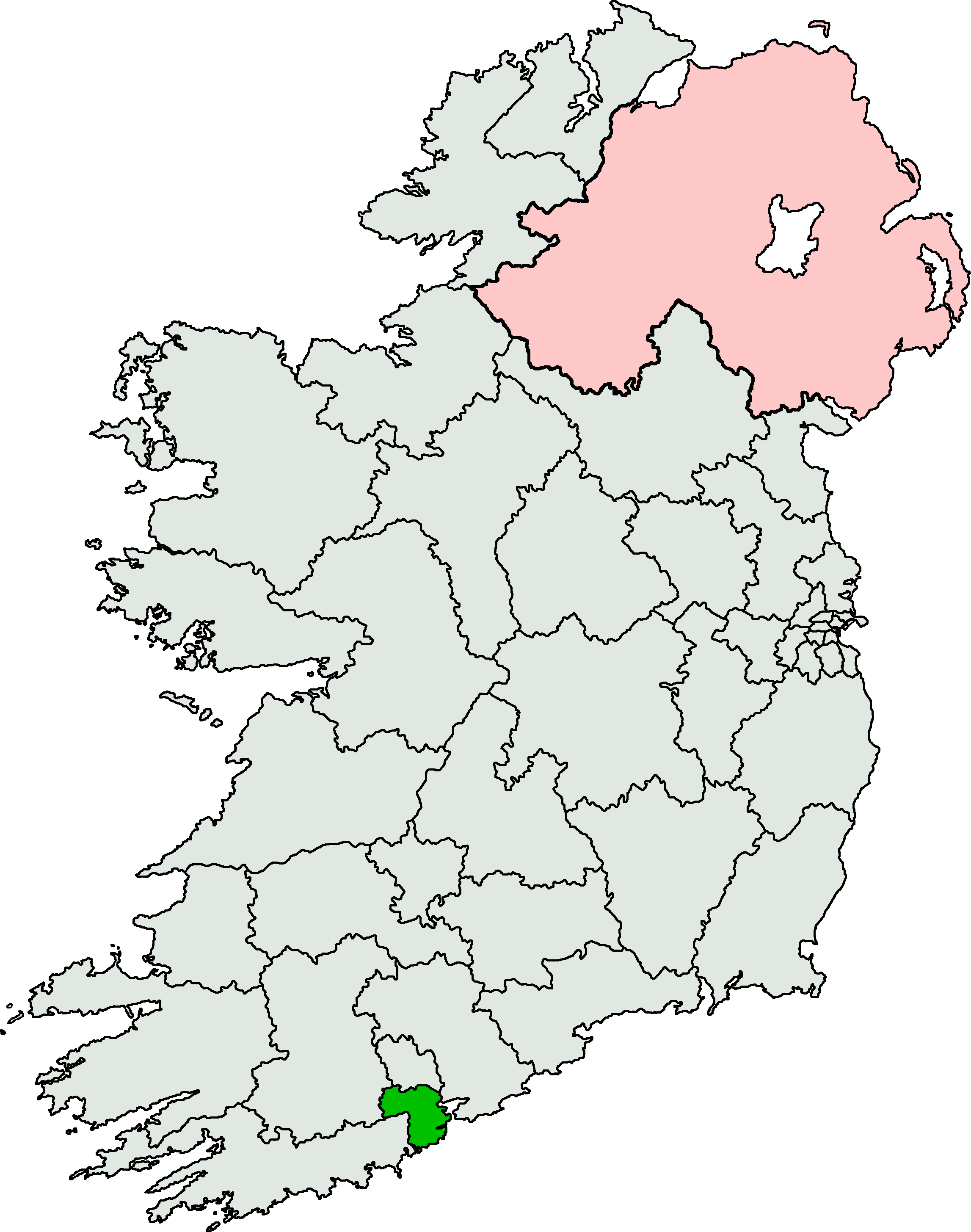
- Cork South-Central shown within Ireland
TD before election
Hugh Coveney
Fine Gael
TD after election
Simon Coveney
Fine Gael

A Dáil by-election was held in the constituency of Cork South-Central in Ireland on Friday, 23 October 1998, to fill a vacancy in the 28th Dáil. It followed the death of Fine Gael Teachta Dála (TD) Hugh Coveney on 14 March 1998.

The writ of election to fill the vacancy was agreed by the Dáil on 30 September 1998.

The by-election was won by the Fine Gael candidate Simon Coveney, son of the deceased TD, Hugh Coveney.

The other candidates were Sinead Behan for Fianna Fáil, Cork City Councillor and former TD Toddy O'Sullivan for the Labour Party, Cork City Councillor Dan Boyle for the Green Party, Henry Cremin for Sinn Féin, Peter Kelly for the Progressive Democrats, Brian McEnery for the Natural Law Party, and Benny Cooney and Jim Tallon as independents.

Dan Boyle later represented the constituency as a TD from 2002 to 2007.

== Result ==
1998 Cork South-Central by-election
Party	Candidate	FPv%	Count		
Party	Candidate	FPv%	1	2	3
Fine Gael	Simon Coveney	37.7	16,212	16,720	23,230
Fianna Fáil	Sinead Behan	29.4	12,658	13,372	16,379
Labour	Toddy O'Sullivan	19.0	8,171	8,689	
Green	Dan Boyle	8.1	3,461	4,017	
Sinn Féin	Henry Cremin	2.7	1,158		
Progressive Democrats	Peter Kelly	2.3	971		
Independent	Benny Cooney	0.5	197		
Natural Law	Brian McEnery	0.4	150		
Independent	Jim Tallon	0.1	29		
Electorate: 87,606 Valid: 43,007 Quota: 21,504 Turnout: 49.1%
