= 1994 Cork South-Central by-election =

By-election to the 27th Dáil

- 10 November 1994
- Turnout: 42,134 (53.7%)
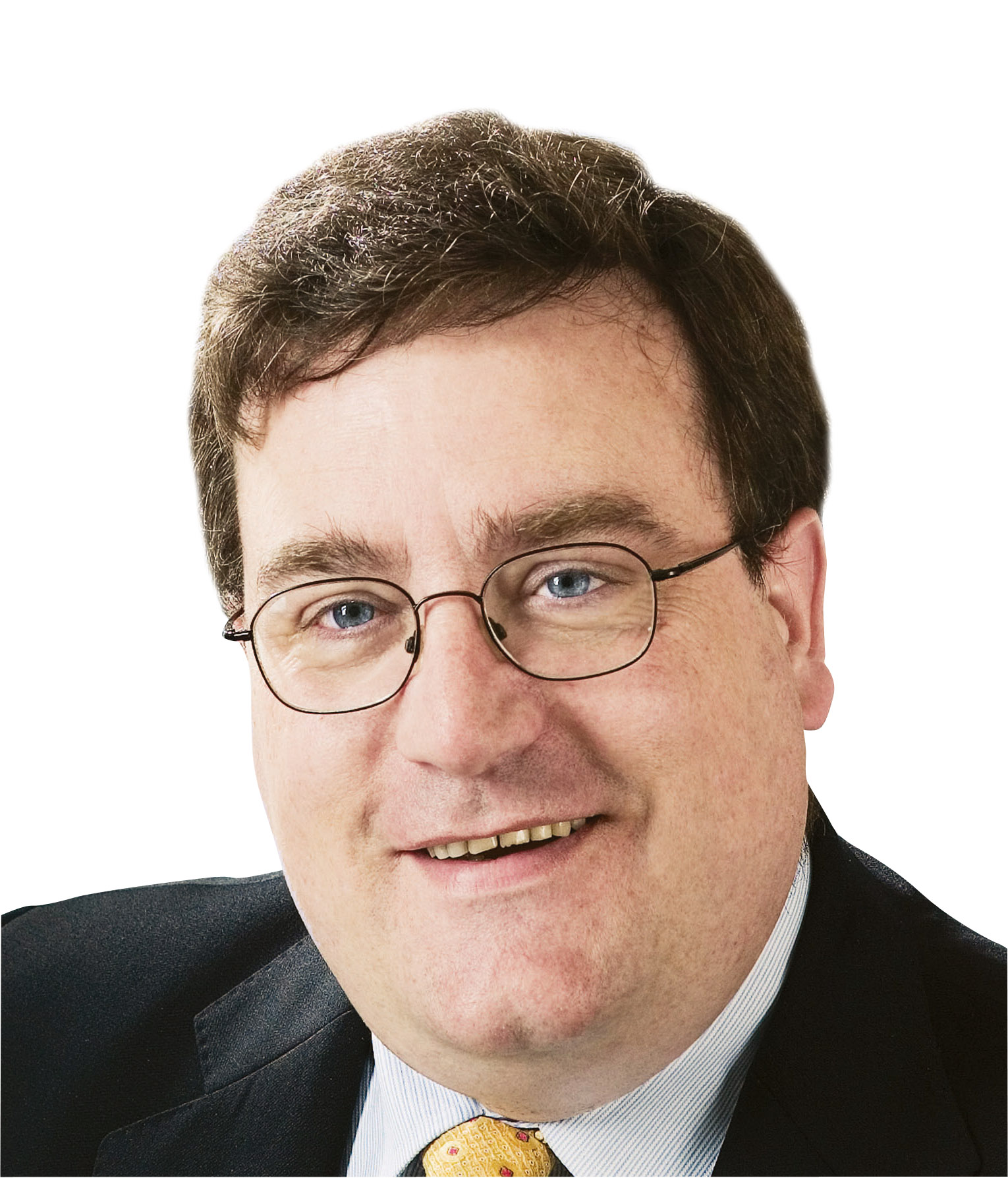
	Coveney	Dennehy
Nominee	Hugh Coveney	John Dennehy	Dan Boyle
Party	Fine Gael	Fianna Fáil	Green
First preferences	13,128	13,316	6,677
Percentage	31.2%	31.6%	15.8%
Final count	19,396	17,421	–
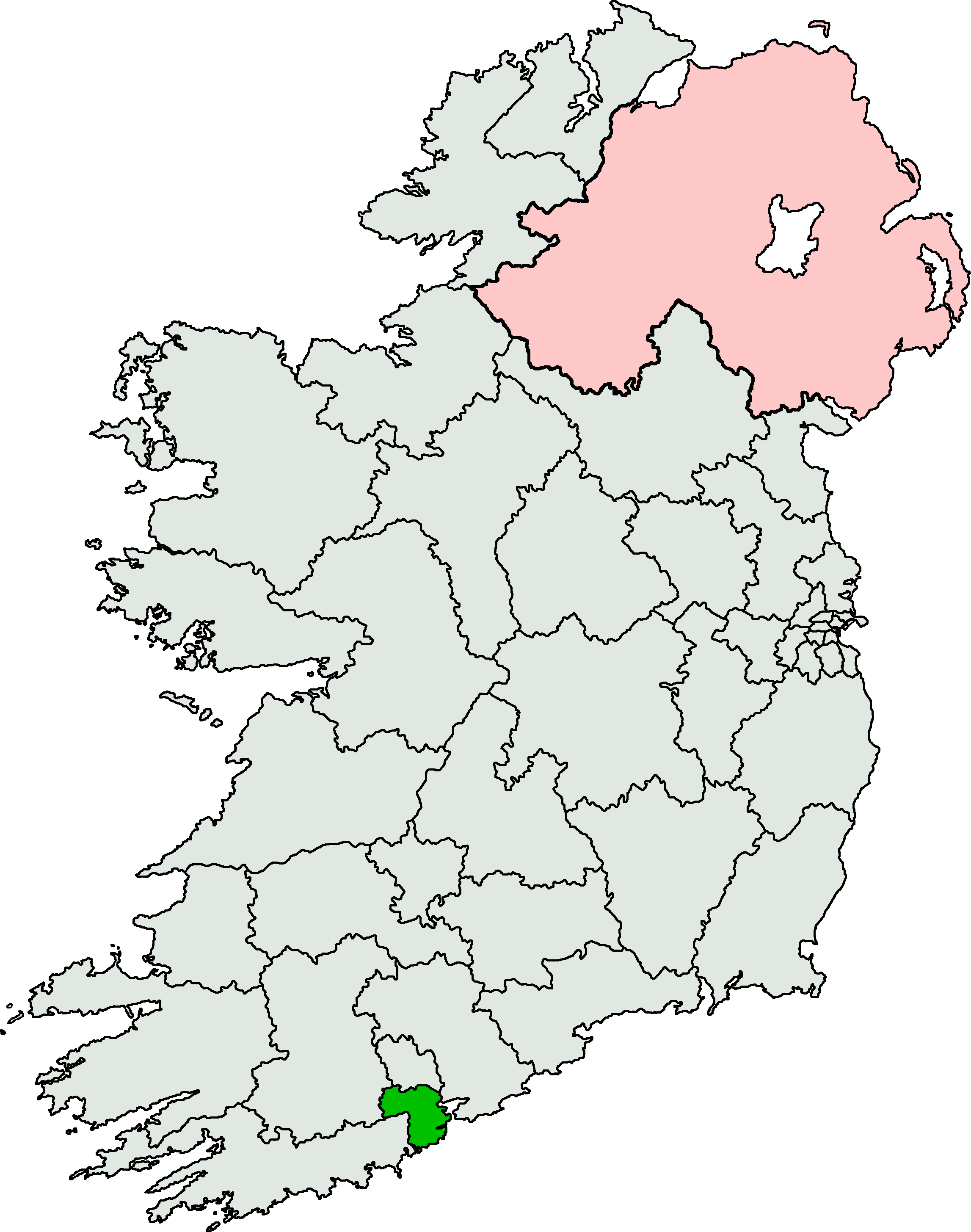
- Cork South-Central shown within Ireland
TD before election
Pat Cox
Independent
TD after election
Hugh Coveney
Fine Gael

A Dáil by-election was held in the constituency of Cork South-Central in Ireland on Thursday, 10 November 1994, to fill a vacancy in the 27th Dáil. It followed the resignation of independent Teachta Dála (TD) Pat Cox in June 1994 on his re-election to the European Parliament.

The writ of election to fill the vacancy was agreed by the Dáil on 18 October 1994.

The by-election was won by former TD Hugh Coveney of Fine Gael.

Among the candidates were Cork City Councillor and former and future TD John Dennehy, Cork City Councillor Dan Boyle, former Senator Brendan Ryan and Cork City Councillor Joe O'Flynn.

On the same day, a by-election took place in Cork North-Central.

== Result ==
1994 Cork South-Central by-election
Party	Candidate	FPv%	Count					
Party	Candidate	FPv%	1	2	3	4	5	6
Fianna Fáil	John Dennehy	31.6	13,316	13,423	13,832	14,040	14,683	17,421
Fine Gael	Hugh Coveney	31.2	13,128	13,224	13,539	14,337	14,810	19,396
Green	Dan Boyle	15.8	6,677	6,982	7,453	7,928	8,437	
Independent	Brendan Ryan	6.2	2,618	2,853	3,074	3,268	3,561	
Labour	Joe O'Flynn	4.6	1,940	2,022	2,073	2,144		
Progressive Democrats	Alan Ellard	4.1	1,719	1,789	1,873			
Christian Solidarity	Catherine Kelly	4.0	1,704	1,764				
Workers' Party	Sean McCarthy	1.9	813					
Natural Law	Brian McEnery	0.5	219					
Electorate: 78,420 Valid: 42,134 Quota: 21,068 Turnout: 53.7%
