= Toddy O'Sullivan =

Irish politician (1934–2021)

Minister of State
- 1994–1997: Tourism and Trade
- 1986–1987: Environment

Teachta Dála
- In office February 1987 – June 1997
- Constituency: Cork South-Central
- In office June 1981 – February 1987
- Constituency: Cork North-Central

Lord Mayor of Cork
- In office 1980–1981

Personal details
- Born: 8 November 1934 Cork, Ireland
- Died: 12 December 2021 (aged 87) Cork, Ireland
- Party: Labour Party
- Spouse: Esther Chandley
- Children: 3

Toddy O'Sullivan (8 November 1934 – 12 December 2021) was an Irish Labour Party politician who served for sixteen years as a Teachta Dála (TD) for constituencies in Cork, and for five years as a junior minister. He also served as Lord Mayor of Cork from 1980 to 1981.

== Early life ==
A native of the Barrack Street area in the south inner-city area of Cork, O'Sullivan was educated at Greenmount National School before becoming a postal clerk.

== Political career ==
A member of Cork City Council, O'Sullivan was Lord Mayor of Cork for the 1980 to 1981 term. O'Sullivan first stood as a candidate for Dáil Éireann at the by-election on 7 November 1979 in the Cork City constituency, following the death of Labour TD Patrick Kerrigan. The by-election was won by Fine Gael's Liam Burke, but O'Sullivan was successful at his next attempt, when he topped the poll at the 1981 general election in the new constituency of Cork North-Central.

He was re-elected at the next five general elections, moving in 1987 to Cork South-Central, before losing his seat at the 1997 general election. He stood again at the by-election on 23 October 1998 in Cork South-Central following the death of Fine Gael TD Hugh Coveney, but the seat was won by Coveney's son Simon Coveney.

== Ministerial career ==
In February 1986 he was appointed Minister of State at the Department of the Environment. Along with the other Labour ministers, he resigned on 20 January 1987 in protest at proposed cuts in health spending, bringing about the coalition's collapse.

Six years later, after the 1992 general election led to a coalition with Fianna Fáil, O'Sullivan became Chairman of the Dáil's Enterprise and Economic Strategy Committee. After the collapse of that government and its replacement with the Fine Gael–Labour Party–Democratic Left Rainbow Coalition, Taoiseach John Bruton appointed him in December 1994 as Minister of State at the Department of Tourism and Trade, a position he held until Fianna Fáil returned to power at the 1997 general election.

== Death ==
O'Sullivan died on 12 December 2021, at the age of 87.

Civic offices
Preceded by Jim Corr	Lord Mayor of Cork; 1980–1981	Succeeded by Paud Black

Dáil	Election	Deputy (Party)	Deputy (Party)	Deputy (Party)	Deputy (Party)	Deputy (Party)
22nd	1981	Toddy O'Sullivan (Lab)	Liam Burke (FG)	Denis Lyons (FF)	Bernard Allen (FG)	Seán French (FF)
23rd	1982 (Feb)	Toddy O'Sullivan (Lab)	Liam Burke (FG)	Denis Lyons (FF)	Bernard Allen (FG)	Seán French (FF)
24th	1982 (Nov)	Toddy O'Sullivan (Lab)	Liam Burke (FG)	Denis Lyons (FF)	Bernard Allen (FG)	Dan Wallace (FF)
25th	1987	Máirín Quill (PDs)	Liam Burke (FG)	Denis Lyons (FF)	Bernard Allen (FG)	Dan Wallace (FF)
26th	1989	Máirín Quill (PDs)	Gerry O'Sullivan (Lab)	Denis Lyons (FF)	Bernard Allen (FG)	Dan Wallace (FF)
27th	1992	Máirín Quill (PDs)	Gerry O'Sullivan (Lab)	Liam Burke (FG)	Bernard Allen (FG)	Dan Wallace (FF)
27th	1994 by-election	Máirín Quill (PDs)	Kathleen Lynch (DL)	Liam Burke (FG)	Bernard Allen (FG)	Dan Wallace (FF)
28th	1997	Billy Kelleher (FF)	Noel O'Flynn (FF)	Liam Burke (FG)	Bernard Allen (FG)	Dan Wallace (FF)
29th	2002	Billy Kelleher (FF)	Noel O'Flynn (FF)	Kathleen Lynch (Lab)	Bernard Allen (FG)	Dan Wallace (FF)
30th	2007	Billy Kelleher (FF)	Noel O'Flynn (FF)	Kathleen Lynch (Lab)	Bernard Allen (FG)	4 seats from 2007
31st	2011	Billy Kelleher (FF)	Jonathan O'Brien (SF)	Kathleen Lynch (Lab)	Dara Murphy (FG)	4 seats from 2007
32nd	2016	Billy Kelleher (FF)	Jonathan O'Brien (SF)	Mick Barry (AAA–PBP)	Dara Murphy (FG)	4 seats from 2007
32nd	2019 by-election	Pádraig O'Sullivan (FF)	Jonathan O'Brien (SF)	Mick Barry (AAA–PBP)	Dara Murphy (FG)	4 seats from 2007
33rd	2020	Pádraig O'Sullivan (FF)	Thomas Gould (SF)	Mick Barry (S–PBP)	Colm Burke (FG)	4 seats from 2007
34th	2024	Pádraig O'Sullivan (FF)	Thomas Gould (SF)	Eoghan Kenny (Lab)	Colm Burke (FG)	Ken O'Flynn (II)

Dáil	Election	Deputy (Party)	Deputy (Party)	Deputy (Party)	Deputy (Party)	Deputy (Party)
22nd	1981	Eileen Desmond (Lab)	Gene Fitzgerald (FF)	Pearse Wyse (FF)	Hugh Coveney (FG)	Peter Barry (FG)
23rd	1982 (Feb)	Eileen Desmond (Lab)	Gene Fitzgerald (FF)	Pearse Wyse (FF)	Jim Corr (FG)	Peter Barry (FG)
24th	1982 (Nov)	Eileen Desmond (Lab)	Gene Fitzgerald (FF)	Pearse Wyse (FF)	Hugh Coveney (FG)	Peter Barry (FG)
25th	1987	Toddy O'Sullivan (Lab)	John Dennehy (FF)	Batt O'Keeffe (FF)	Pearse Wyse (PDs)	Peter Barry (FG)
26th	1989	Toddy O'Sullivan (Lab)	John Dennehy (FF)	Micheál Martin (FF)	Pearse Wyse (PDs)	Peter Barry (FG)
27th	1992	Toddy O'Sullivan (Lab)	Batt O'Keeffe (FF)	Micheál Martin (FF)	Pat Cox (PDs)	Peter Barry (FG)
27th	1994 by-election	Toddy O'Sullivan (Lab)	Batt O'Keeffe (FF)	Micheál Martin (FF)	Hugh Coveney (FG)	Peter Barry (FG)
28th	1997	John Dennehy (FF)	Batt O'Keeffe (FF)	Micheál Martin (FF)	Hugh Coveney (FG)	Deirdre Clune (FG)
28th	1998 by-election	John Dennehy (FF)	Batt O'Keeffe (FF)	Micheál Martin (FF)	Simon Coveney (FG)	Deirdre Clune (FG)
29th	2002	John Dennehy (FF)	Batt O'Keeffe (FF)	Micheál Martin (FF)	Simon Coveney (FG)	Dan Boyle (GP)
30th	2007	Ciarán Lynch (Lab)	Michael McGrath (FF)	Micheál Martin (FF)	Simon Coveney (FG)	Deirdre Clune (FG)
31st	2011	Ciarán Lynch (Lab)	Michael McGrath (FF)	Micheál Martin (FF)	Simon Coveney (FG)	Jerry Buttimer (FG)
32nd	2016	Donnchadh Ó Laoghaire (SF)	Michael McGrath (FF)	Micheál Martin (FF)	Simon Coveney (FG)	4 seats 2016–2024
33rd	2020	Donnchadh Ó Laoghaire (SF)	Michael McGrath (FF)	Micheál Martin (FF)	Simon Coveney (FG)	4 seats 2016–2024
34th	2024	Donnchadh Ó Laoghaire (SF)	Séamus McGrath (FF)	Micheál Martin (FF)	Jerry Buttimer (FG)	Pádraig Rice (SD)
