= Peter Barry (politician) =

Irish politician (1928–2016)

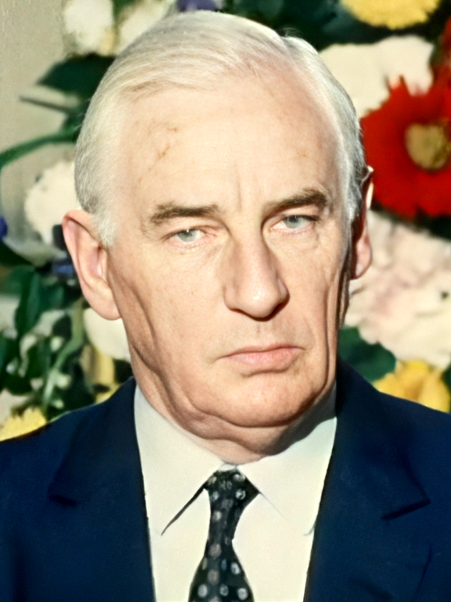
- Barry in 1984

Tánaiste
- In office 20 January 1987 – 10 March 1987
- Taoiseach: Garret FitzGerald
- Preceded by: Dick Spring
- Succeeded by: Brian Lenihan

Deputy leader of Fine Gael
- In office 14 January 1991 – 5 February 1993
- Leader: John Bruton
- Preceded by: John Bruton
- Succeeded by: Nora Owen
- In office 14 September 1977 – 26 March 1987
- Leader: Garret FitzGerald
- Preceded by: Tom O'Higgins
- Succeeded by: John Bruton

Minister for Foreign Affairs
- In office 14 December 1982 – 10 March 1987
- Taoiseach: Garret FitzGerald
- Preceded by: Gerry Collins
- Succeeded by: Brian Lenihan

Minister for the Environment
- In office 30 June 1981 – 9 March 1982
- Taoiseach: Garret FitzGerald
- Preceded by: Ray Burke
- Succeeded by: Ray Burke

Minister for Education
- In office 2 December 1976 – 25 May 1977
- Taoiseach: Liam Cosgrave
- Preceded by: Richard Burke
- Succeeded by: John Wilson

Minister for Transport and Power
- In office 14 March 1973 – 2 December 1976
- Taoiseach: Liam Cosgrave
- Preceded by: Michael O'Kennedy
- Succeeded by: Tom Fitzpatrick

Teachta Dála
- In office June 1981 – June 1997
- Constituency: Cork South-Central
- In office June 1977 – June 1981
- Constituency: Cork City
- In office June 1969 – June 1977
- Constituency: Cork City South-East

Personal details
- Born: 10 August 1928 Blackrock, Cork, Ireland
- Died: 26 August 2016 (aged 88) Cork, Ireland
- Party: Fine Gael
- Spouse: Margaret O'Mullane (m. 1953; died 2013)
- Children: 6, including Deirdre
- Parent: Anthony Barry (father)
- Education: University College Cork

Peter Barry (10 August 1928 – 26 August 2016) was an Irish Fine Gael politician who served as Tánaiste from January 1987 to March 1987, Deputy leader of Fine Gael from 1977 to 1987 and 1991 to 1993, Minister for Foreign Affairs from 1982 to 1987, Minister for the Environment from 1981 to 1982, Minister for Education from 1976 to 1977, Minister for Transport and Power from 1973 to 1976 and Lord Mayor of Cork from 1970 to 1971. He served as a Teachta Dála (TD) from 1969 to 1997.

== Early life and education ==
Barry was born in Blackrock, Cork, in 1928. He was the son of Anthony Barry, a Fine Gael TD and a well-known businessman. He was educated at Christian Brothers College, Cork and then became the major shareholder in the family company, Barry's Tea.

== Political career ==
He was first elected to Dáil Éireann as a Fine Gael TD for the Cork City South-East constituency at the 1969 general election. He would go on to win a Dáil seat at eight successive further general elections, changing constituency to Cork City in 1977 and Cork South-Central in 1981. When Fine Gael came to power following the 1973 general election, he was appointed Minister for Transport and Power. In 1976, he became Minister for Education. In 1979, after Garret FitzGerald had become leader of Fine Gael, Barry was elected deputy leader. From June 1981 to March 1982, he served as Minister for the Environment.

From December 1982 to 1987, he was Minister for Foreign Affairs. In this capacity, he was heavily involved in the negotiations which resulted in the 1985 Anglo-Irish Agreement. He also became the first joint chairman of the Anglo-Irish Inter-Governmental Conference, established under the Agreement by the Irish and British governments. Following the Labour Party's withdrawal from the coalition government in 1987, Barry became Tánaiste, for a brief period. He was the first member of Fine Gael to hold the office of Tánaiste.

When FitzGerald resigned as Fine Gael leader after the 1987 general election, Barry was one of three candidates (along with Alan Dukes and John Bruton) who contested the party leadership. Dukes was the eventual victor.

He retired at the 1997 general election, at which his seat was held for Fine Gael by his daughter Deirdre Clune. She later served as a Senator representing the Cultural and Educational Panel, but resigned in 2014, on being elected as a Member of the European Parliament for Ireland South.

=== 1986 Northern Ireland by-elections ===
In 1986, the fifteen Unionist members of the House of Commons in Westminster resigned in protest at the Anglo-Irish Agreement, causing by-elections. To ensure contests in each constituency, Wesley Robert Williamson changed his name by deed poll to Peter Barry, deliberately taking the name of the Irish Minister held responsible for the negotiations, and stood in the four constituencies, North Antrim, South Antrim, East Londonderry and Strangford, under the label "For the Anglo-Irish Agreement". Despite not campaigning, he won over 6,000 votes.

== Personal life ==
His sister, Terry Kelly, served as Mayor of Limerick from 1983 to 1984.

== See also ==
- Families in the Oireachtas

Civic offices
Preceded by Thomas Pearse Leahy	Lord Mayor of Cork; 1970–1971	Succeeded by Timothy J. O'Sullivan
Political offices
Preceded by Michael O'Kennedy	Minister for Transport and Power; 1973–1976	Succeeded by Tom Fitzpatrick
Preceded by Richard Burke	Minister for Education; 1976–1977	Succeeded by John Wilson
Preceded by Ray Burke	Minister for the Environment; 1981–1982	Succeeded by Ray Burke
Preceded by Gerry Collins	Minister for Foreign Affairs; 1982–1987	Succeeded by Brian Lenihan
Preceded by Dick Spring	Tánaiste; 1987	Succeeded by Brian Lenihan
Party political offices
Preceded by Tom O'Higgins	Deputy leader of Fine Gael; 1977–1987	Succeeded by John Bruton
Preceded by John Bruton	Deputy leader of Fine Gael; 1991–1993	Succeeded by Nora Owen

Dáil	Election	Deputy (Party)	Deputy (Party)	Deputy (Party)
19th	1969	Pearse Wyse (FF)	Gus Healy (FF)	Peter Barry (FG)
20th	1973	Pearse Wyse (FF)	Gus Healy (FF)	Peter Barry (FG)
21st	1977	Constituency abolished. See Cork City		

Dáil	Election	Deputy (Party)	Deputy (Party)	Deputy (Party)	Deputy (Party)	Deputy (Party)
21st	1977	Jack Lynch (FF)	Seán French (FF)	Pearse Wyse (FF)	Patrick Kerrigan (Lab)	Peter Barry (FG)
21st	1979 by-election	Jack Lynch (FF)	Seán French (FF)	Pearse Wyse (FF)	Liam Burke (FG)	Peter Barry (FG)
22nd	1981	Constituency abolished. See Cork North-Central and Cork South-Central				

Dáil	Election	Deputy (Party)	Deputy (Party)	Deputy (Party)	Deputy (Party)	Deputy (Party)
22nd	1981	Eileen Desmond (Lab)	Gene Fitzgerald (FF)	Pearse Wyse (FF)	Hugh Coveney (FG)	Peter Barry (FG)
23rd	1982 (Feb)	Eileen Desmond (Lab)	Gene Fitzgerald (FF)	Pearse Wyse (FF)	Jim Corr (FG)	Peter Barry (FG)
24th	1982 (Nov)	Eileen Desmond (Lab)	Gene Fitzgerald (FF)	Pearse Wyse (FF)	Hugh Coveney (FG)	Peter Barry (FG)
25th	1987	Toddy O'Sullivan (Lab)	John Dennehy (FF)	Batt O'Keeffe (FF)	Pearse Wyse (PDs)	Peter Barry (FG)
26th	1989	Toddy O'Sullivan (Lab)	John Dennehy (FF)	Micheál Martin (FF)	Pearse Wyse (PDs)	Peter Barry (FG)
27th	1992	Toddy O'Sullivan (Lab)	Batt O'Keeffe (FF)	Micheál Martin (FF)	Pat Cox (PDs)	Peter Barry (FG)
27th	1994 by-election	Toddy O'Sullivan (Lab)	Batt O'Keeffe (FF)	Micheál Martin (FF)	Hugh Coveney (FG)	Peter Barry (FG)
28th	1997	John Dennehy (FF)	Batt O'Keeffe (FF)	Micheál Martin (FF)	Hugh Coveney (FG)	Deirdre Clune (FG)
28th	1998 by-election	John Dennehy (FF)	Batt O'Keeffe (FF)	Micheál Martin (FF)	Simon Coveney (FG)	Deirdre Clune (FG)
29th	2002	John Dennehy (FF)	Batt O'Keeffe (FF)	Micheál Martin (FF)	Simon Coveney (FG)	Dan Boyle (GP)
30th	2007	Ciarán Lynch (Lab)	Michael McGrath (FF)	Micheál Martin (FF)	Simon Coveney (FG)	Deirdre Clune (FG)
31st	2011	Ciarán Lynch (Lab)	Michael McGrath (FF)	Micheál Martin (FF)	Simon Coveney (FG)	Jerry Buttimer (FG)
32nd	2016	Donnchadh Ó Laoghaire (SF)	Michael McGrath (FF)	Micheál Martin (FF)	Simon Coveney (FG)	4 seats 2016–2024
33rd	2020	Donnchadh Ó Laoghaire (SF)	Michael McGrath (FF)	Micheál Martin (FF)	Simon Coveney (FG)	4 seats 2016–2024
34th	2024	Donnchadh Ó Laoghaire (SF)	Séamus McGrath (FF)	Micheál Martin (FF)	Jerry Buttimer (FG)	Pádraig Rice (SD)
