= Donnchadh Ó Laoghaire =

Irish politician (born 1989)

Donnchadh Ó Laoghaire TD
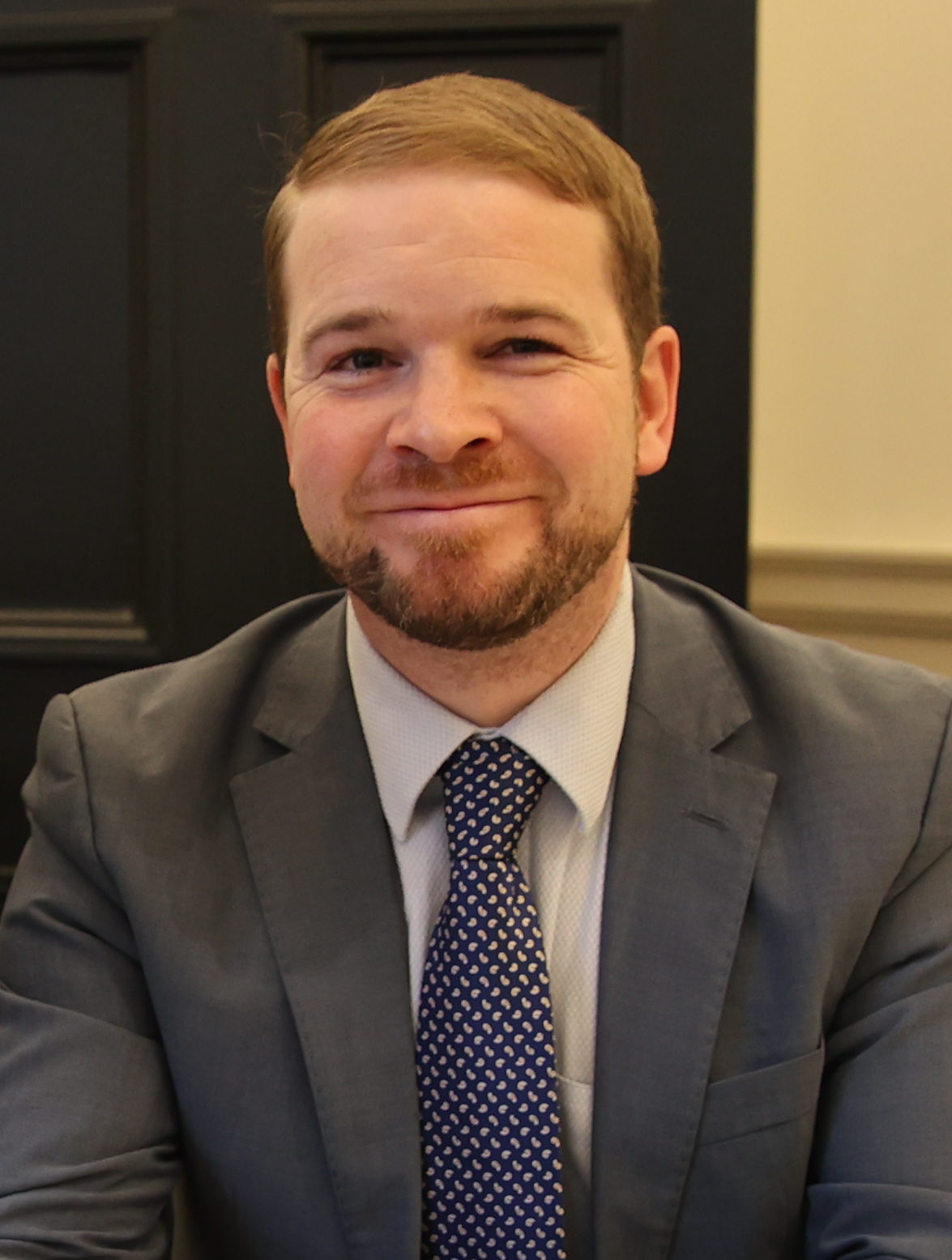
- Ó Laoghaire in 2024

Teachta Dála
- Incumbent
- Assumed office February 2016
- Constituency: Cork South-Central

Personal details
- Born: 8 February 1989 (age 37) Cork, Ireland
- Party: Sinn Féin
- Spouse: Eimear Ruane-McAteer (m. 2021)
- Children: 3
- Education: University College Cork

Donnchadh Ó Laoghaire (Irish pronunciation: [ˈd̪ˠʊn̪ˠəxə oː ˈl̪ˠeːɾʲə]; born 8 February 1989) is an Irish Sinn Féin politician who has been a Teachta Dála (TD) for the Cork South-Central constituency since the 2016 general election.

== Early life ==
Ó Laoghaire is from Togher, Cork. As a youth, he was a member of the local Scouting Ireland group, the 37th Cork (Togher), before going on to be an adult volunteer in the Scout group in The Lough. He attended University College Cork (UCC) and graduated with a law degree. While in UCC, he joined Sinn Féin's youth wing Ógra Shinn Féin, eventually taking a year out to work as an organiser for Ógra. He then worked as a parliamentary assistant for Sinn Féin politicians David Cullinane, Trevor Ó Clochartaigh and Sandra McLellan.

== Political career ==
While working as McLellan's parliamentary assistant, he ran in the 2014 Cork County Council election, and was elected, serving as a member of Cork County Council from 2014 to 2016. He was re-elected at the 2020 general election. As of 2021, he is Sinn Féin's spokesperson for Education.

In April 2021, Ó Laoghaire settled a defamation claim against RTÉ for over €150,000 following comments made about Ó Laoghaire on Liveline.

At the 2024 general election, Ó Laoghaire was re-elected to the Dáil.

== Political views ==
Ó Laoghaire supports Eoin O'Broin's categorisation of Sinn Féin ideology as "Left Republican". Ó Laoghaire views Left Republicanism's core values as seeking equality, Irish unity, national democracy, and pluralism.

Speaking regarding the link between Irish Republicanism and violence, Ó Laoghaire has stated that it was not necessary to agree with the Provisional Irish Republican Army campaign or every aspect of Sinn Féin's past to support or join the party, though he argued it would be difficult to identify with Sinn Féin without understanding the root causes of the conflict. He described pre-1968 Northern Ireland as an unsustainable, discriminatory and authoritarian system where reform had failed, leading to escalation after events such as the Burntollet Bridge incident. He noted that many Sinn Féin members did not agree with all aspects of the IRA's actions, with some rejecting the armed struggle entirely, and said this diversity of views should be welcomed, as the party's focus was on shaping Ireland's future.

== Personal life ==
In 2021, Ó Laoghaire married Eimear Ruane-McAteer. The couple have three children.

Dáil	Election	Deputy (Party)	Deputy (Party)	Deputy (Party)	Deputy (Party)	Deputy (Party)
22nd	1981	Eileen Desmond (Lab)	Gene Fitzgerald (FF)	Pearse Wyse (FF)	Hugh Coveney (FG)	Peter Barry (FG)
23rd	1982 (Feb)	Eileen Desmond (Lab)	Gene Fitzgerald (FF)	Pearse Wyse (FF)	Jim Corr (FG)	Peter Barry (FG)
24th	1982 (Nov)	Eileen Desmond (Lab)	Gene Fitzgerald (FF)	Pearse Wyse (FF)	Hugh Coveney (FG)	Peter Barry (FG)
25th	1987	Toddy O'Sullivan (Lab)	John Dennehy (FF)	Batt O'Keeffe (FF)	Pearse Wyse (PDs)	Peter Barry (FG)
26th	1989	Toddy O'Sullivan (Lab)	John Dennehy (FF)	Micheál Martin (FF)	Pearse Wyse (PDs)	Peter Barry (FG)
27th	1992	Toddy O'Sullivan (Lab)	Batt O'Keeffe (FF)	Micheál Martin (FF)	Pat Cox (PDs)	Peter Barry (FG)
27th	1994 by-election	Toddy O'Sullivan (Lab)	Batt O'Keeffe (FF)	Micheál Martin (FF)	Hugh Coveney (FG)	Peter Barry (FG)
28th	1997	John Dennehy (FF)	Batt O'Keeffe (FF)	Micheál Martin (FF)	Hugh Coveney (FG)	Deirdre Clune (FG)
28th	1998 by-election	John Dennehy (FF)	Batt O'Keeffe (FF)	Micheál Martin (FF)	Simon Coveney (FG)	Deirdre Clune (FG)
29th	2002	John Dennehy (FF)	Batt O'Keeffe (FF)	Micheál Martin (FF)	Simon Coveney (FG)	Dan Boyle (GP)
30th	2007	Ciarán Lynch (Lab)	Michael McGrath (FF)	Micheál Martin (FF)	Simon Coveney (FG)	Deirdre Clune (FG)
31st	2011	Ciarán Lynch (Lab)	Michael McGrath (FF)	Micheál Martin (FF)	Simon Coveney (FG)	Jerry Buttimer (FG)
32nd	2016	Donnchadh Ó Laoghaire (SF)	Michael McGrath (FF)	Micheál Martin (FF)	Simon Coveney (FG)	4 seats 2016–2024
33rd	2020	Donnchadh Ó Laoghaire (SF)	Michael McGrath (FF)	Micheál Martin (FF)	Simon Coveney (FG)	4 seats 2016–2024
34th	2024	Donnchadh Ó Laoghaire (SF)	Séamus McGrath (FF)	Micheál Martin (FF)	Jerry Buttimer (FG)	Pádraig Rice (SD)
