= Cork South-Central =

Irish parliamentary constituency (1981–present)

- Dáil constituency
- Location of Cork South-Central within Ireland
- Interactive map of constituency boundaries since the 2024 general election
- Major settlements: Bishopstown; Carrigaline; Cork City (City centre and southside); Douglas; Passage West

Current constituency
- Created: 1981
- Seats: 5 (1981–2016); 4 (2016–2024); 5 (2024–)
- TDs: Jerry Buttimer (FG); Micheál Martin (FF); Séamus McGrath (FF); Donnchadh Ó Laoghaire (SF); Pádraig Rice (SD)
- Local government area: Cork City; County Cork
- EP constituency: South

Cork South-Central is a parliamentary constituency represented in Dáil Éireann, the lower house of the Irish parliament or Oireachtas. The constituency elects five deputies (Teachtaí Dála, commonly known as TDs) on the system of proportional representation by means of the single transferable vote (PR-STV).

== History and boundaries ==
The constituency was created under the Electoral (Amendment) Act 1980 and first used at the 1981 general election, taking in parts of the former Cork City and Cork Mid constituencies. It is a mixed urban-rural constituency encompassing the south of Cork City, county towns and a rural hinterland. It encompasses the electoral areas of Cork City south of the river Lee, together with most of the Carrigaline electoral area of County Cork, including the Ringaskiddy and Passage West areas.

The Constituency Review Report 2023 of the Electoral Commission recommended that at the next general election, Cork South-Central be increased to a five-seat constituency with the transfer of territory from Cork North-Central.

The Electoral (Amendment) Act 2023 defines the constituency as:

"The city of Cork, except the parts thereof which are comprised in the constituencies of Cork North-Central and Cork North-West;

and, in the county of Cork, the electoral divisions of:

Carrigaline, Monkstown Urban, in the former Rural District of Cork;

and those parts contained in the county of Cork of the electoral divisions of:

Ballygarvan, Douglas, Inishkenny, Monkstown Rural, in the former Rural District of Cork;
Carrigaline, Kilpatrick, Liscleary, Templebreedy, in the former Rural District of Kinsale."

Changes to the Cork South-Central constituency
Years	TDs	Boundaries	Notes
1981–1992	5	The county borough of Cork, except the part in the constituency of Cork North-Central; and, in the county of Cork, the district electoral divisions of Ballincollig, Ballygarvan, Bishopstown, Carrigaline, Douglas, Dunderrow, Inishkenny, Lehenagh, Monkstown Rural, Monkstown Urban, Ovens in the former Rural District of Cork; Ballyfeard, Ballyfoyle, Ballymartle, Carrigaline, Cullen, Farranbrien, Kilmonoge, Kilpatrick, Kinure, Liscleary, Nohaval, Templebreedy, Templemichael, in the former Rural District of Kinsale.	
1992–2002	5	The county borough of Cork, except the part in the constituency of Cork North-Central; and, in the county of Cork, the district electoral divisions of Ballincollig, Ballygarvan, Bishopstown, Carrigaline, Douglas, Dunderrow, Inishkenny, Lehenagh, Monkstown Rural, Monkstown Urban, Ovens in the former Rural District of Cork; Ballyfeard, Ballyfoyle, Carrigaline, Cullen, Farranbrien, Kilmonoge, Kilpatrick, Kinure, Liscleary, Nohaval, Templebreedy in the former Rural District of Kinsale.	Wards of Bishopstown A, Bishopstown B and Bishopstown C transferred to Cork North-Central; district electoral divisions of Ballymartle and Templemichael transferred to Cork South-West.
2002–2007	5	The city of Cork, except the part in the constituency of Cork North-Central; and, in the county of Cork, the electoral divisions of Ballincollig, Ballygarvan, Bishopstown, Carrigaline, Douglas, Dunderrow, Inishkenny, Lehenagh, Monkstown Rural, Monkstown Urban in the former Rural District of Cork; Ballyfeard, Ballyfoyle, Carrigaline, Cullen, Farranbrien, Kilmonoge, Kilpatrick, Kinure, Liscleary, Nohaval, Templebreedy in the former Rural District of Kinsale.	Electoral divisions of Evergreen, Glasheen A, Glasheen B, Tramore A and Turners Cross A transferred to Cork North-Central; Electoral division of Ovens transferred to Cork North-West.
2007–2016	5	The city of Cork, except the part in the constituency of Cork North-Central; and, in the county of Cork, the electoral divisions of Ballygarvan, Bishopstown, Carrigaline, Douglas, Iniskenny, Lehenagh, Monkstown Rural, Monkstown Urban in the former Rural District of Cork; Carrigaline, Kilpatrick, Liscleary, Templebreedy in the former Rural District of Kinsale.	Electoral divisions of Ballinlough A, Bishopstown A, Bishopstown B, Bishopstown C, Centre A, Centre B, City Hall A, City Hall B, Evergreen, Gillabbey A, Gilabbey B, Gilabbey C, Glasheen A, Glasheen B, Mardyke, South Gate, South Gate B, Tramore A and Turner's Cross A transferred from Cork North-Central; Electoral divisions of Dunderrow, Ballyfeard, Ballyfoyle, Cullen, Farranbrien, Kilmonoge, Kinure and Nohaval transferred to Cork South-West; Electoral division of Ballincollig transferred to Cork North-West.
2016–	4	The city of Cork, except the part in the constituency of Cork North-Central; and, in the county of Cork, the electoral divisions of Ballygarvan, Carrigaline, Douglas, Iniskenny, Lehenagh, Monkstown Rural, Monkstown Urban, and the townland of Ballinaspig in the electoral division of Bishopstown (part) in the former Rural District of Cork; Carrigaline, Kilpatrick, Liscleary, Templebreedy in the former Rural District of Kinsale.	Electoral divisions of Bishopstown A, Bishopstown B, Bishopstown C, Centre A, Centre B, Gillabbey A, Gillabbey B, Gillabbey C, Glasheen A, Glasheen B, Mardyke and the townland of Inchigaggin transferred to Cork North-Central.

== TDs ==
Teachtaí Dála (TDs) for Cork South-Central 1981–
Key to parties: FF = Fianna Fáil; FG = Fine Gael; GP = Green; Lab = Labour; PDs = Progressive Democrats; SF = Sinn Féin; SD = Social Democrats
Dáil	Election	Deputy (Party)	Deputy (Party)	Deputy (Party)	Deputy (Party)	Deputy (Party)
22nd	1981	Eileen Desmond (Lab)	Gene Fitzgerald (FF)	Pearse Wyse (FF)	Hugh Coveney (FG)	Peter Barry (FG)
23rd	1982 (Feb)	Eileen Desmond (Lab)	Gene Fitzgerald (FF)	Pearse Wyse (FF)	Jim Corr (FG)	Peter Barry (FG)
24th	1982 (Nov)	Eileen Desmond (Lab)	Gene Fitzgerald (FF)	Pearse Wyse (FF)	Hugh Coveney (FG)	Peter Barry (FG)
25th	1987	Toddy O'Sullivan (Lab)	John Dennehy (FF)	Batt O'Keeffe (FF)	Pearse Wyse (PDs)	Peter Barry (FG)
26th	1989	Toddy O'Sullivan (Lab)	John Dennehy (FF)	Micheál Martin (FF)	Pearse Wyse (PDs)	Peter Barry (FG)
27th	1992	Toddy O'Sullivan (Lab)	Batt O'Keeffe (FF)	Micheál Martin (FF)	Pat Cox (PDs)	Peter Barry (FG)
27th	1994 by-election	Toddy O'Sullivan (Lab)	Batt O'Keeffe (FF)	Micheál Martin (FF)	Hugh Coveney (FG)	Peter Barry (FG)
28th	1997	John Dennehy (FF)	Batt O'Keeffe (FF)	Micheál Martin (FF)	Hugh Coveney (FG)	Deirdre Clune (FG)
28th	1998 by-election	John Dennehy (FF)	Batt O'Keeffe (FF)	Micheál Martin (FF)	Simon Coveney (FG)	Deirdre Clune (FG)
29th	2002	John Dennehy (FF)	Batt O'Keeffe (FF)	Micheál Martin (FF)	Simon Coveney (FG)	Dan Boyle (GP)
30th	2007	Ciarán Lynch (Lab)	Michael McGrath (FF)	Micheál Martin (FF)	Simon Coveney (FG)	Deirdre Clune (FG)
31st	2011	Ciarán Lynch (Lab)	Michael McGrath (FF)	Micheál Martin (FF)	Simon Coveney (FG)	Jerry Buttimer (FG)
32nd	2016	Donnchadh Ó Laoghaire (SF)	Michael McGrath (FF)	Micheál Martin (FF)	Simon Coveney (FG)	4 seats 2016–2024
33rd	2020	Donnchadh Ó Laoghaire (SF)	Michael McGrath (FF)	Micheál Martin (FF)	Simon Coveney (FG)	4 seats 2016–2024
34th	2024	Donnchadh Ó Laoghaire (SF)	Séamus McGrath (FF)	Micheál Martin (FF)	Jerry Buttimer (FG)	Pádraig Rice (SD)

Note: The columns in this table are used only for presentational purposes, and no significance should be attached to the order of columns. For details of the order in which seats were won at each election, see the detailed results of that election.

== Elections ==
*: Outgoing TD

=== 2024 general election ===
2024 general election: Cork South-Central
Party	Candidate	FPv%	Count																	
Party	Candidate	FPv%	1	2	3	4	5	6	7	8	9	10	11	12	13	14	15	16	17	18
Fianna Fáil	Micheál Martin	23.2	14,526																	
Fianna Fáil	Séamus McGrath	12.4	7,794	9,940	9,950	9,957	9,972	9,982	10,016	10,051	10,064	10,758								
Sinn Féin	Donnchadh Ó Laoghaire	11.1	6,947	7,041	7,055	7,068	7,092	7,116	7,179	7,245	7,383	7,405	7,418	7,468	7,580	7,853	10,152	10,647		
Social Democrats	Pádraig Rice	8.6	5,368	5,447	5,455	5,481	5,512	5,630	5,665	5,680	6,194	6,220	6,238	6,324	7,103	7,279	7,527	9,418	9,533	10,242
Fine Gael	Jerry Buttimer	7.0	4,407	4,834	4,840	4,846	4,854	4,878	4,909	4,918	4,927	5,082	5,181	5,955	6,286	6,459	6,532	7,223	7,250	10,917
Fine Gael	Shane O'Callaghan	5.8	3,664	3,959	3,960	3,962	3,976	3,980	3,989	4,009	4,014	4,082	4,133	5,004	5,232	5,479	5,512	5,943	5,958	
Independent	Mick Finn	5.7	3,582	3,706	3,734	3,770	3,816	3,843	4,083	4,323	4,369	4,408	4,433	4,486	4,585	5,488	5,640	6,138	6,177	6,651
Labour	Laura Harmon	4.8	3,005	3,111	3,114	3,128	3,147	3,200	3,237	3,243	3,315	3,378	3,404	3,555	4,262	4,405	4,643			
Sinn Féin	Michelle Cowhey Shahid	4.3	2,714	2,731	2,745	2,753	2,774	2,816	2,838	2,860	2,960	2,968	2,969	2,993	3,060	3,214				
Aontú	Anna Daly	3.6	2,273	2,297	2,303	2,313	2,379	2,393	2,434	2,784	2,815	2,835	2,846	2,892	2,951					
Green	Monica Oikeh	3.4	2,156	2,233	2,240	2,260	2,265	2,294	2,307	2,314	2,381	2,418	2,447	2,596						
Fine Gael	Úna McCarthy	3.3	2,078	2,213	2,215	2,217	2,221	2,227	2,233	2,247	2,251	2,313	2,347							
PBP–Solidarity	Shane Laird (Note: Laird is a member of People Before Profit.)	1.4	876	882	894	914	926	1,002	1,018	1,052										
National Party	Ted Neville	1.4	858	864	894	904	959	962	978											
Fianna Fáil	Margaret Kenneally	1.2	726	1,214	1,215	1,218	1,221	1,225	1,232	1,239	1,241									
Independent	Paudie Dineen	0.9	543	569	580	598	619	633												
Rabharta	Lorna Bogue	0.7	425	433	436	451	460													
Independent Ireland	Veronica Houlihan	0.5	348	353	381	392														
Independent	Graham de Barra	0.3	217	223	230															
Independent Ireland	Valerie Ward	0.2	104	105																
Independent	John O'Leary	0.1	58	61																
Independent	Tony Field	0.1	35	37																
Electorate: 105,076 Valid: 62,704 Spoilt: 423 Quota: 10,451 Turnout: 60.1%

=== 2020 general election ===
2020 general election: Cork South-Central
Party	Candidate	FPv%	Count							
Party	Candidate	FPv%	1	2	3	4	5	6	7	8
Sinn Féin	Donnchadh Ó Laoghaire	24.6	14,057							
Fianna Fáil	Micheál Martin	19.3	11,023	11,197	11,234	11,297	11,360	11,505		
Fine Gael	Simon Coveney	16.3	9,327	9,408	9,439	9,465	9,525	9,720	9,847	12,170
Fianna Fáil	Michael McGrath	16.2	9,236	9,499	9,527	9,576	9,636	9,775	10,350	10,809
Green	Lorna Bogue	9.4	5,379	5,787	5,833	5,931	6,448	7,184	7,537	9,179
Fine Gael	Jerry Buttimer	4.9	2,828	2,869	2,882	2,897	2,926	3,066	3,112	
Aontú	Anna Daly	2.4	1,350	1,495	1,565	1,664	1,736	1,821		
Labour	Ciara Kennedy	2.2	1,263	1,404	1,424	1,490	1,707			
Social Democrats	Patricia O'Dwyer	1.9	1,077	1,311	1,367	1,439				
Solidarity–PBP	Bobby Murray Walsh (Note: Murray Walsh was a member of People Before Profit.)	1.3	764	1,360	1,466	1,651	1,977	2,120	2,377	
Independent	Paudie Dineen	0.8	429	697	898					
Independent	William O'Brien	0.4	202	381						
Independent	John Donohoe	0.2	103	145						
Independent	Sean O'Leary	0.2	102	158						
Electorate: 90,916 Valid: 57,140 Spoilt: 317 Quota: 11,429 Turnout: 63.2%

=== 2016 general election ===
2016 general election: Cork South-Central
Party	Candidate	FPv%	Count										
Party	Candidate	FPv%	1	2	3	4	5	6	7	8	9	10	11
Fianna Fáil	Michael McGrath	21.2	11,795										
Fianna Fáil	Micheál Martin	20.4	11,346										
Fine Gael	Simon Coveney	14.3	7,965	8,180	8,233	8,241	8,293	8,303	8,468	8,527	8,591	9,315	10,372
Sinn Féin	Donnchadh Ó Laoghaire	12.5	6,986	7,090	7,122	7,152	7,257	7,414	7,524	7,877	8,366	8,526	10,653
Fine Gael	Jerry Buttimer	11.5	6,419	6,498	6,530	6,532	6,568	6,582	6,701	6,727	6,786	7,843	9,117
Labour	Ciarán Lynch	4.3	2,417	2,462	2,478	2,481	2,504	2,513	2,574	2,611	2,685		
Independent	Mick Finn	4.3	2,378	2,423	2,446	2,454	2,528	2,583	2,686	2,869	3,199	3,356	
Green	Lorna Bogue	3.7	2,064	2,095	2,108	2,114	2,183	2,243	2,364	2,452	2,930	3,291	
AAA–PBP	Fiona Ryan	1.7	937	954	960	976	1,037	1,492	1,592	1,882			
Renua	Ciarán Kenneally	1.6	887	931	944	951	990	1,014					
Independent	Diarmuid Ó Cadhla	1.6	869	885	891	941	1,047	1,107	1,188				
AAA–PBP	Jim O'Connell	1.4	795	810	815	829	880						
Independent	Joe Harris	0.6	350	371	376	388							
Independent	Elizabeth Hourihane	0.5	304	327	329	333							
Independent	Michael Mohally	0.3	170	173	176								
Electorate: 84,482 Valid: 55,682 Spoilt: 404 Quota: 11,137 Turnout: 66.4%

=== 2011 general election ===
2011 general election: Cork South-Central
Party	Candidate	FPv%	Count											
Party	Candidate	FPv%	1	2	3	4	5	6	7	8	9	10	11	12
Fianna Fáil	Micheál Martin	16.7	10,715											
Fine Gael	Simon Coveney	14.8	9,447	9,450	9,471	9,521	9,558	9,712	9,976	10,169	10,531	10,872		
Labour	Ciarán Lynch	13.2	8,481	8,484	8,516	8,543	8,593	8,810	9,218	9,921	12,565			
Fianna Fáil	Michael McGrath	11.3	7,221	7,248	7,274	7,327	7,350	7,484	7,635	7,911	8,120	8,393	9,025	10,023
Fine Gael	Jerry Buttimer	11.1	7,128	7,130	7,150	7,173	7,194	7,327	7,553	7,822	8,032	8,410	13,096	
Fine Gael	Deirdre Clune	8.8	5,650	5,652	5,672	5,689	5,709	5,803	5,982	6,124	6,364	6,690		
Sinn Féin	Chris O'Leary	8.2	5,250	5,251	5,291	5,319	5,414	5,688	5,796	6,463	6,719	7,268	7,640	8,187
Labour	Paula Desmond	5.3	3,388	3,389	3,412	3,455	3,499	3,609	3,877	4,127				
Independent	Mick Finn	3.7	2,386	2,387	2,440	2,540	2,597	2,882	2,960					
Green	Dan Boyle	2.6	1,640	1,641	1,650	1,672	1,708	1,800						
New Vision	David McCarthy (Note: New Vision was an electoral alliance of independent non-party candidates and did not appear on the ballot.)	1.4	880	880	917	952	1,037							
Independent	Ted Neville	0.8	523	523	547	581	639							
Independent	Diarmaid Ó Cadhla	0.8	508	508	531	563								
Independent	Seán Dunphy	0.7	448	448	481									
Independent	Eric Isherwood	0.3	193	193										
Independent	Finbarr O'Driscoll	0.1	92	92										
Independent	Gerard Linehan	0.1	90	90										
Electorate: 90,044 Valid: 64,040 Spoilt: 624 (1.0%) Quota: 10,674 Turnout: 64,664 (71.8%)

=== 2007 general election ===
2007 general election: Cork South-Central
Party	Candidate	FPv%	Count					
Party	Candidate	FPv%	1	2	3	4	5	6
Fianna Fáil	Micheál Martin	19.0	11,226					
Fianna Fáil	Michael McGrath	16.7	9,866					
Fine Gael	Simon Coveney	9.9	5,863	5,960	6,058	6,451	8,042	9,363
Fine Gael	Deirdre Clune	9.7	5,739	5,843	5,941	6,447	8,565	9,875
Labour	Ciarán Lynch	9.2	5,466	5,566	5,730	6,528	7,285	9,851
Fine Gael	Jerry Buttimer	8.8	5,180	5,242	5,337	5,760		
Fianna Fáil	John Dennehy	8.6	5,062	5,810	5,921	7,087	7,448	8,067
Green	Dan Boyle	8.4	4,945	5,057	5,263	6,318	6,994	
Sinn Féin	Henry Cremin	5.1	3,020	3,054	3,198			
Progressive Democrats	John Minihan	2.7	1,596	1,706	1,807			
Immigration Control	Ted Neville	1.4	804	814				
Independent	Gerard Linehan	0.2	155	156				
Independent	Morgan Stack	0.2	116	118				
Independent	Maurice Fitzgerald	0.1	30	31				
Electorate: 91,090 Valid: 59,068 Spoilt: 592 (0.9%) Quota: 9,845 Turnout: 59,660 (65.5%)

=== 2002 general election ===
2002 general election: Cork South-Central
Party	Candidate	FPv%	Count									
Party	Candidate	FPv%	1	2	3	4	5	6	7	8	9	10
Fianna Fáil	Micheál Martin	26.7	14,742									
Fianna Fáil	Batt O'Keeffe	11.9	6,556	8,224	8,279	8,393	8,694	8,897	9,112	9,331		
Fine Gael	Deirdre Clune	10.0	5,535	5,848	5,886	5,982	6,075	6,593				
Fianna Fáil	John Dennehy	10.0	5,533	7,256	7,295	7,697	8,061	8,281	8,480	8,684	8,766	8,789
Fine Gael	Simon Coveney	9.4	5,183	5,757	5,793	5,906	6,038	6,634	11,573			
Independent	Kathy Sinnott	9.0	4,984	5,393	5,491	5,909	6,450	7,215	7,724	8,654	8,696	8,783
Green	Dan Boyle	9.0	4,952	5,394	5,506	5,766	6,334	7,761	8,304	9,317		
Labour	Brendan Ryan	5.9	3,282	3,461	3,509	3,743	3,966					
Sinn Féin	Tom Hanlon	3.7	2,063	2,176	2,254	2,480						
Independent	Con O'Connell	3.3	1,821	1,914	2,004							
Immigration Control	Ted Neville	0.7	372	383								
Socialist Workers	Michael O'Sullivan	0.4	217	227								
Electorate: 89,646 Valid: 55,240 Spoilt: 545 (0.9%) Quota: 9,207 Turnout: 55,785 (62.2%)

=== 1998 by-election ===
Fine Gael TD Hugh Coveney died on 14 March 1998. A by-election to fill the vacancy was held on 23 October 1998. It was won by the Fine Gael candidate Simon Coveney, son of the deceased TD.

1998 by-election: Cork South-Central
Party	Candidate	FPv%	Count		
Party	Candidate	FPv%	1	2	3
Fine Gael	Simon Coveney	37.7	16,212	16,720	23,230
Fianna Fáil	Sinead Behan	29.4	12,658	13,372	16,379
Labour	Toddy O'Sullivan	19.0	8,171	8,689	
Green	Dan Boyle	8.1	3,461	4,017	
Sinn Féin	Henry Cremin	2.7	1,158		
Progressive Democrats	Peter Kelly	2.3	971		
Independent	Benny Cooney	0.5	197		
Natural Law	Brian McEnery	0.4	150		
Independent	Jim Tallon	0.1	29		
Electorate: 87,606 Valid: 43,007 Quota: 21,504 Turnout: 49.1%

=== 1997 general election ===
1997 general election: Cork South-Central
Party	Candidate	FPv%	Count								
Party	Candidate	FPv%	1	2	3	4	5	6	7	8	9
Fianna Fáil	Micheál Martin	17.5	9,652								
Fine Gael	Hugh Coveney	17.2	9,524								
Fianna Fáil	Batt O'Keeffe	13.2	7,279	7,462	7,478	7,585	7,812	8,419	9,194		
Fianna Fáil	John Dennehy	11.9	6,524	6,682	6,694	6,788	6,938	7,118	7,851	8,124	8,975
Labour	Toddy O'Sullivan	8.9	4,908	4,933	4,979	5,090	5,229	5,410	5,512	6,054	7,636
Fine Gael	Deirdre Clune	8.4	4,602	4,622	4,781	4,860	5,009	5,196	5,476	7,274	8,469
Green	Dan Boyle	6.6	3,622	3,650	3,666	4,051	4,375	4,588	4,884	5,184	
Fine Gael	Sylvester Cotter	4.9	2,701	2,712	2,794	2,853	2,935	3,048	3,182		
Progressive Democrats	Tom Coughlan	4.2	2,304	2,339	2,347	2,400	2,473	2,536			
Independent	Derry Canty	2.7	1,497	1,501	1,505	1,540	1,719				
Independent	Matty O'Callaghan	2.3	1,254	1,263	1,268	1,444					
Independent	Tim Murphy	1.2	663	665	666						
Independent	Seán P. Twomey	0.4	215	216	217						
Natural Law	Nora Anne Luck	0.3	182	183	183						
Independent	Séan Ahern	0.2	112	113	113						
Electorate: 84,288 Valid: 55,039 Spoilt: 362 (0.7%) Quota: 9,174 Turnout: 55,401 (65.7%)

=== 1994 by-election ===
Progressive Democrats TD Pat Cox resigned as a TD on 19 July 1994 following his re-election to the European Parliament. A by-election to fill the vacancy was held on 10 November 1994.

1994 by-election: Cork South-Central
Party	Candidate	FPv%	Count					
Party	Candidate	FPv%	1	2	3	4	5	6
Fianna Fáil	John Dennehy	31.6	13,316	13,423	13,832	14,040	14,683	17,421
Fine Gael	Hugh Coveney	31.2	13,128	13,224	13,539	14,337	14,810	19,396
Green	Dan Boyle	15.8	6,677	6,982	7,453	7,928	8,437	
Independent	Brendan Ryan	6.2	2,618	2,853	3,074	3,268	3,561	
Labour	Joe O'Flynn	4.6	1,940	2,022	2,073	2,144		
Progressive Democrats	Alan Ellard	4.1	1,719	1,789	1,873			
Christian Solidarity	Catherine Kelly	4.0	1,704	1,764				
Workers' Party	Sean McCarthy	1.9	813					
Natural Law	Brian McEnery	0.5	219					
Electorate: 78,420 Valid: 42,134 Quota: 21,068 Turnout: 53.7%

=== 1992 general election ===
1992 general election: Cork South-Central
Party	Candidate	FPv%	Count														
Party	Candidate	FPv%	1	2	3	4	5	6	7	8	9	10	11	12	13	14	15
Labour	Toddy O'Sullivan	18.0	9,662														
Fianna Fáil	Micheál Martin	14.8	7,939	7,994	8,001	8,010	8,026	8,082	8,148	8,267	8,400	8,493	8,971				
Progressive Democrats	Pat Cox	12.5	6,720	6,816	6,824	6,829	6,839	6,868	6,884	6,953	7,134	7,436	7,545	7,546	8,100	8,842	9,400
Fianna Fáil	Batt O'Keeffe	10.3	5,532	5,566	5,569	5,570	5,579	5,588	5,638	5,709	5,754	5,792	6,128	6,146	6,549	6,762	6,985
Fine Gael	Peter Barry	9.4	5,020	5,099	5,099	5,105	5,111	5,133	5,146	5,180	5,286	6,157	6,261	6,262	6,721	7,088	9,408
Fianna Fáil	John Dennehy	7.3	3,925	3,951	3,953	3,955	3,961	3,983	4,027	4,081	4,122	4,138	4,736	4,750	4,986	5,309	5,733
Fine Gael	Denis (Dino) Cregan	5.5	2,925	3,003	3,004	3,007	3,014	3,081	3,110	3,148	3,222	3,715	3,761	3,762	3,999	4,552	
Democratic Left	Kathleen Lynch	4.7	2,539	2,720	2,732	2,737	2,780	2,937	3,032	3,056	3,395	3,436	3,470	3,471	3,807		
Independent	Liam Hurley	4.2	2,239	2,278	2,281	2,292	2,304	2,339	2,404	2,482	2,651	2,685	2,974	2,976			
Fianna Fáil	Barry Cogan	3.6	1,941	1,952	1,955	1,962	1,965	1,967	1,983	2,030	2,058	2,081					
Fine Gael	Jim Corr	3.4	1,828	1,859	1,860	1,863	1,867	1,872	1,881	1,911	1,975						
Green	Dan Boyle	2.2	1,166	1,205	1,219	1,227	1,246	1,281	1,378	1,462							
Independent	John Weldon	1.3	697	703	706	729	734	773	795								
Sinn Féin	Liam Burke	1.1	592	598	599	599	610	633									
Independent	Con O'Connell	1.0	526	540	554	560	592										
Workers' Party	Jerry McCarthy	0.3	172	196	197	198											
Independent	Seán P. Twomey	0.2	87	93	105												
Independent	Nora-Anne Luck	0.2	85	89													
Electorate: 76,141 Valid: 53,595 Spoilt: 712 (1.3%) Quota: 8,933 Turnout: 54,307 (71.3%)

=== 1989 general election ===
1989 general election: Cork South-Central
Party	Candidate	FPv%	Count						
Party	Candidate	FPv%	1	2	3	4	5	6	7
Fine Gael	Peter Barry	14.5	7,791	7,975	8,178	8,360	12,843		
Fianna Fáil	Micheál Martin	12.2	6,564	6,612	7,294	7,685	7,917	8,074	8,458
Labour	Toddy O'Sullivan	11.8	6,300	6,393	6,534	9,092			
Fianna Fáil	Batt O'Keeffe	11.2	6,012	6,068	6,754	6,882	7,020	7,130	7,388
Fine Gael	Jim Corr	11.0	5,899	6,109	6,233	6,421			
Fianna Fáil	John Dennehy	10.4	5,586	5,638	7,134	7,372	7,552	7,660	8,017
Progressive Democrats	Pearse Wyse	10.3	5,527	6,490	6,684	7,171	8,323	11,825	
Workers' Party	Kathleen Lynch	8.3	4,457	4,533	4,611				
Fianna Fáil	Barry Cogan	6.8	3,652	3,731					
Progressive Democrats	John Kevin Coleman	3.1	1,679						
Independent	William Fitzsimon	0.3	150						
Electorate: 78,385 Valid: 53,617 Quota: 8,937 Turnout: 68.4%

=== 1987 general election ===
1987 general election: Cork South-Central
Party	Candidate	FPv%	Count									
Party	Candidate	FPv%	1	2	3	4	5	6	7	8	9	10
Progressive Democrats	Pearse Wyse	19.4	10,935									
Fine Gael	Peter Barry	13.0	7,328	7,449	7,570	7,695	7,960	8,089	8,207	9,343	9,541	
Fianna Fáil	John Dennehy	10.8	6,099	6,185	6,264	6,318	6,425	6,738	8,471	8,831	12,113	
Fine Gael	Hugh Coveney	8.8	4,926	5,023	5,117	5,245	5,530	5,637	5,717	7,052	7,408	7,500
Labour	Toddy O'Sullivan	8.6	4,862	5,045	5,159	5,337	5,607	6,607	6,922	7,673	7,952	8,069
Fianna Fáil	Batt O'Keeffe	7.9	4,437	4,507	4,552	4,585	4,641	4,763	5,713	6,034	7,184	9,711
Fianna Fáil	Barry Cogan	7.7	4,305	4,367	4,403	4,514	4,721	4,935	5,475	5,723		
Fianna Fáil	Micheál Martin	6.4	3,619	3,710	3,754	3,811	3,909	4,219				
Progressive Democrats	Owen Curtin	5.5	3,112	3,295	4,245	4,424	4,775	5,036	5,168			
Workers' Party	Kathleen Lynch	4.2	2,349	2,539	2,566	2,791	2,940					
Independent	Charles Hennessy	2.8	1,585	1,739	1,762	1,967						
Independent	Mary Dunphy	2.2	1,229	1,377	1,402							
Independent	Sean Beausang	1.3	756									
Independent	Bernie Murphy	0.8	441									
Independent	Cornelius O'Donovan	0.4	245									
Independent	Michael T. Murphy	0.1	31									
Electorate: 75,322 Valid: 56,259 Quota: 9,377 Turnout: 74.7%

=== November 1982 general election ===
November 1982 general election: Cork South-Central
Party	Candidate	FPv%	Count						
Party	Candidate	FPv%	1	2	3	4	5	6	7
Fine Gael	Peter Barry	19.2	9,472						
Fianna Fáil	Pearse Wyse	17.5	8,673						
Fine Gael	Hugh Coveney	15.4	7,604	8,615					
Fianna Fáil	Gene Fitzgerald	14.4	7,136	7,149	7,364	7,367	7,660	7,813	8,048
Labour	Eileen Desmond	13.1	6,496	6,577	6,620	6,675	6,878	7,415	8,473
Fianna Fáil	Barry Cogan	6.8	3,375	3,387	3,471	3,473	3,758	3,875	4,003
Fine Gael	Tomás Ryan	5.4	2,689	2,777	2,787	3,093	3,162	3,468	3,619
Workers' Party	Noel Power	3.0	1,485	1,490	1,499	1,501	1,755	1,964	
Independent	Owen Casey	2.6	1,307	1,323	1,329	1,333	1,444		
Fianna Fáil	Valentine Jago	0.9	447	448	507	508			
Irish Republican Socialist	Jim Lane	0.8	398	400	403	403			
Democratic Socialist	Garry O'Sullivan	0.8	369	370	372	372			
Electorate: 67,062 Valid: 49,451 Quota: 8,242 Turnout: 73.7%

=== February 1982 general election ===
February 1982 general election: Cork South-Central
Party	Candidate	FPv%	Count				
Party	Candidate	FPv%	1	2	3	4	5
Fianna Fáil	Pearse Wyse	16.7	8,092				
Fine Gael	Peter Barry	16.6	8,062	8,089			
Fianna Fáil	Gene Fitzgerald	15.5	7,500	7,562	7,625	8,093	
Labour	Eileen Desmond	13.4	6,494	6,613	6,907	7,287	8,399
Fine Gael	Jim Corr	11.9	5,769	5,862	6,297	6,846	10,297
Fianna Fáil	Donal Coleman	9.7	4,688	4,732	4,764	5,060	5,209
Fine Gael	Hugh Coveney	8.7	4,210	4,246	4,558	4,780	
Independent	Mary Kelly	3.9	1,929	2,057	2,090		
Fine Gael	Denis Cregan	2.4	1,168	1,192			
Independent	Declan Murphy	1.2	564				
Electorate: 64,507 Valid: 48,476 Spoilt: 347 (0.7%) Quota: 8,080 Turnout: 48,823 (75.7%)

=== 1981 general election ===
1981 general election: Cork South-Central
Party	Candidate	FPv%	Count						
Party	Candidate	FPv%	1	2	3	4	5	6	7
Fine Gael	Peter Barry	18.1	9,010						
Fianna Fáil	Gene Fitzgerald	15.8	7,889	7,898	8,295	8,413			
Fianna Fáil	Pearse Wyse	15.7	7,819	7,827	8,533				
Labour	Eileen Desmond	13.9	6,961	7,001	7,261	7,273	7,861	8,900	
Fine Gael	Hugh Coveney	10.6	5,274	5,492	5,629	5,638	6,256	6,647	6,946
Fine Gael	Jim Corr	9.4	4,705	5,055	5,153	5,158	5,958	6,364	6,571
Fianna Fáil	Barry Cogan	7.7	3,821	3,831	4,439	4,503	4,602		
Fine Gael	Denis Cregan	4.2	2,109	2,155	2,206	2,210			
Fianna Fáil	Chrissie Ahern	3.9	1,988	1,993					
Independent	Sean Twomey	0.7	358	359					
Electorate: 64,507 Valid: 49,934 Spoilt: 399 (0.8%) Quota: 8,323 Turnout: 50,333 (78.0%)

== See also ==
- Dáil constituencies
- Elections in the Republic of Ireland
- Politics of the Republic of Ireland
- List of Dáil by-elections
- List of political parties in the Republic of Ireland
