= John Minihan (politician) =

Irish former politician (born 1957)

Senator
- In office 12 September 2002 – 13 September 2007
- Constituency: Nominated by the Taoiseach

Personal details
- Born: 24 November 1957 (age 68) County Cork, Ireland
- Party: Progressive Democrats

John Minihan (born 24 November 1957) is an Irish former politician who served as a member of Seanad Éireann for the Progressive Democrats. He had previously served in the Irish Defence Forces where he attained the rank of captain. He stood as Progressive Democrats candidate for the Cork South-Central constituency at the 2007 general election.

== Life before politics ==
Born in County Cork, Ireland; Minihan entered Military College in November 1975 and was stationed in the Eastern Command section. He served three tours of duty with United Nations peacekeeping forces in Lebanon. After his final tour of duty in Lebanon, he returned to Cork where he served as Adjutant in Collins Barracks. In 1996 he retired at the rank of captain to run the family pharmacy business.

== Political career ==
Minihan entered local politics in 1999 when he was elected to Cork City Council for the Progressive Democrats (PDs). In July 2003 he was elected Chairman of the Progressive Democrats.

He unsuccessfully contested the 2002 general election, where he polled 3,126 first preferences votes in the Cork North Central constituency. He was a member of the three-man team representing the Progressive Democrats which negotiated the terms under which the party entered government in coalition with Fianna Fáil.

Subsequently, he was recommended by Mary Harney, Progressive Democrats party leader and Tánaiste, Minihan was nominated by the Taoiseach Bertie Ahern to the Seanad, where on the 12 September he made his maiden speech speaking on the Treaty of Nice.

He worked in a number of committees and jobs including Chair of the Progressive Democrats parliamentary party. He was coordinator of the Oireachtas Joint Houses Friends of Science Committee. He served as a member of the Joint Oireachtas committees on Education and Science, and party spokesman on Education, Defence and Childcare.

On the abolishment of dual mandate in 2003, he resigned his seat on Cork City Council which was filled by co-option. The party seat was not retained by the PDs in the 2004 local elections. In January 2006 he was selected to run for a Dáil seat as a Progressive Democrats candidate in the Cork South-Central at the 2007 general election, but did not win a seat, getting 1,596 first preference votes. He was not returned to the Seanad in the 2007 Seanad election. Minihan is retired from politics.
