= Deirdre Clune =

Irish politician (born 1959)

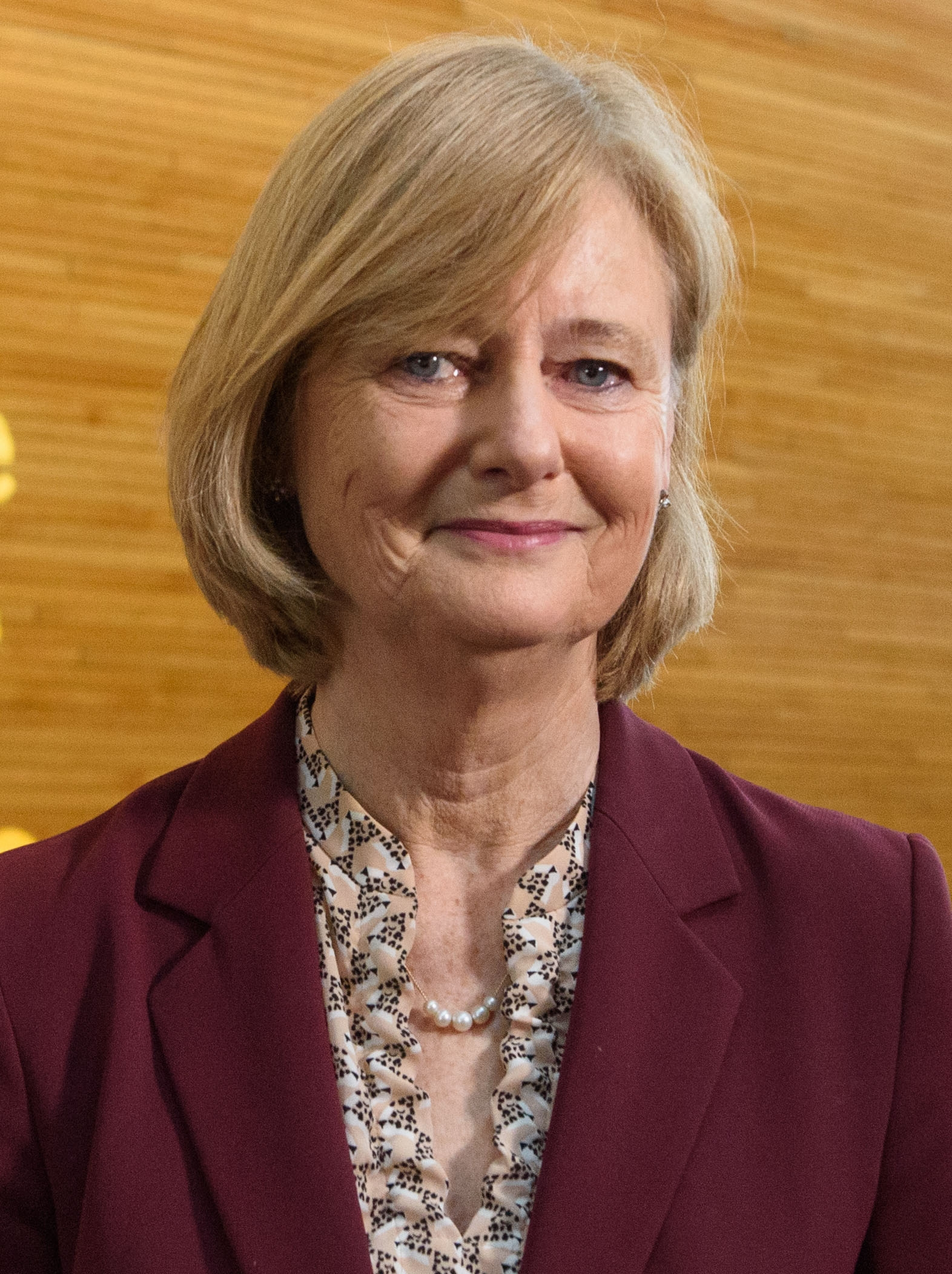
- Clune in 2022

Member of the European Parliament
- In office 1 February 2020 – 17 July 2024
- In office 1 July 2014 – 24 May 2019
- Constituency: South

Senator
- In office 25 May 2011 – 27 May 2014
- Constituency: Cultural and Educational Panel

Teachta Dála
- In office May 2007 – February 2011
- In office June 1997 – May 2002
- Constituency: Cork South-Central

Lord Mayor of Cork
- In office 20 May 2005 – 23 May 2006

Cork City Councillor
- In office June 1999 – May 2007
- Constituency: Cork South-East

Personal details
- Born: Deirdre Barry; 1 June 1959 (age 67) Blackrock, Cork, Ireland
- Party: Ireland: Fine Gael; EU: European People's Party
- Spouse: Conor Clune (m. 1982)
- Children: 4
- Parent: Peter Barry (father)
- Relatives: Anthony Barry (grandfather)
- Education: University College Cork; Trinity College Dublin
- Website: deirdreclune.ie

Deirdre Clune (née Barry; born 1 June 1959) is an Irish politician who served as a Member of the European Parliament (MEP) from Ireland for the South constituency from 2014 to 2019, and again from 2020 to 2024. She is a member of Fine Gael, part of the European People's Party.

She previously served as a Senator for the Cultural and Educational Panel from 2011 to 2014, a Teachta Dála (TD) for the Cork South-Central constituency from 1997 to 2002 and 2007 to 2011 and Lord Mayor of Cork from 2005 to 2006.

== Early life ==
Clune was educated at Ursuline Convent Cork, and went on to graduate from University College Cork in 1980, with a B.E. in Civil Engineering. She completed a diploma in Management Engineering at Trinity College Dublin in 1983 and returned to UCC in 1996 to complete her HDip in Environmental Engineering.

== Political career ==
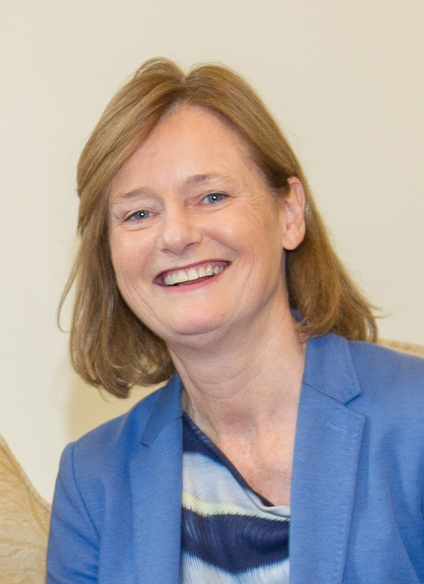
Clune in 2014

Clune was first elected to Dáil Éireann at the 1997 general election succeeding her father, Peter Barry who was retiring. Her grandfather Anthony Barry had also been a TD, making her a third generation member of the Dáil. In the Dáil, she was appointed Fine Gael front bench spokesperson on Arts, Heritage, Gaeltacht and the Islands in June 2000 and spokesperson on Environmental and Consumer Affairs from February 2001.

She lost her seat at the 2002 general election. She also contested the 2002 elections to the 22nd Seanad on the Industrial and Commercial Panel, but was unsuccessful.

She was a member of Cork City Council from 1999 to 2007 and became the 68th Lord Mayor of Cork on 27 June 2005.

Clune regained her Dáil seat at the 2007 general election. She was appointed deputy spokesperson on Enterprise with special responsibility for Innovation from 2007 to 2010. In July 2010, she was appointed as party spokesperson on Innovation and Research.

She lost her seat at the 2011 general election to party colleague Jerry Buttimer. She was subsequently elected to Seanad Éireann on the Cultural and Educational Panel in April 2011, where she served as Fine Gael Seanad spokesperson on Enterprise, Jobs and Innovation.

At the 2014 European Parliament election, she was elected for the South constituency. She was re-elected at the 2019 European Parliament election for South but took the fifth and final Brexit seat, so she did not take her seat until after the United Kingdom left the European Union on 31 January 2020.

On 15 November 2023, Clune announced that she would not contest the 2024 European Parliament election.

== See also ==
- Families in the Oireachtas

Civic offices
Preceded by Seán Martin	Lord Mayor of Cork; 2005	Succeeded by Michael Ahern

Dáil	Election	Deputy (Party)	Deputy (Party)	Deputy (Party)	Deputy (Party)	Deputy (Party)
22nd	1981	Eileen Desmond (Lab)	Gene Fitzgerald (FF)	Pearse Wyse (FF)	Hugh Coveney (FG)	Peter Barry (FG)
23rd	1982 (Feb)	Eileen Desmond (Lab)	Gene Fitzgerald (FF)	Pearse Wyse (FF)	Jim Corr (FG)	Peter Barry (FG)
24th	1982 (Nov)	Eileen Desmond (Lab)	Gene Fitzgerald (FF)	Pearse Wyse (FF)	Hugh Coveney (FG)	Peter Barry (FG)
25th	1987	Toddy O'Sullivan (Lab)	John Dennehy (FF)	Batt O'Keeffe (FF)	Pearse Wyse (PDs)	Peter Barry (FG)
26th	1989	Toddy O'Sullivan (Lab)	John Dennehy (FF)	Micheál Martin (FF)	Pearse Wyse (PDs)	Peter Barry (FG)
27th	1992	Toddy O'Sullivan (Lab)	Batt O'Keeffe (FF)	Micheál Martin (FF)	Pat Cox (PDs)	Peter Barry (FG)
27th	1994 by-election	Toddy O'Sullivan (Lab)	Batt O'Keeffe (FF)	Micheál Martin (FF)	Hugh Coveney (FG)	Peter Barry (FG)
28th	1997	John Dennehy (FF)	Batt O'Keeffe (FF)	Micheál Martin (FF)	Hugh Coveney (FG)	Deirdre Clune (FG)
28th	1998 by-election	John Dennehy (FF)	Batt O'Keeffe (FF)	Micheál Martin (FF)	Simon Coveney (FG)	Deirdre Clune (FG)
29th	2002	John Dennehy (FF)	Batt O'Keeffe (FF)	Micheál Martin (FF)	Simon Coveney (FG)	Dan Boyle (GP)
30th	2007	Ciarán Lynch (Lab)	Michael McGrath (FF)	Micheál Martin (FF)	Simon Coveney (FG)	Deirdre Clune (FG)
31st	2011	Ciarán Lynch (Lab)	Michael McGrath (FF)	Micheál Martin (FF)	Simon Coveney (FG)	Jerry Buttimer (FG)
32nd	2016	Donnchadh Ó Laoghaire (SF)	Michael McGrath (FF)	Micheál Martin (FF)	Simon Coveney (FG)	4 seats 2016–2024
33rd	2020	Donnchadh Ó Laoghaire (SF)	Michael McGrath (FF)	Micheál Martin (FF)	Simon Coveney (FG)	4 seats 2016–2024
34th	2024	Donnchadh Ó Laoghaire (SF)	Séamus McGrath (FF)	Micheál Martin (FF)	Jerry Buttimer (FG)	Pádraig Rice (SD)
