= Pádraig Rice =

Irish politician

Pádraig Rice TD
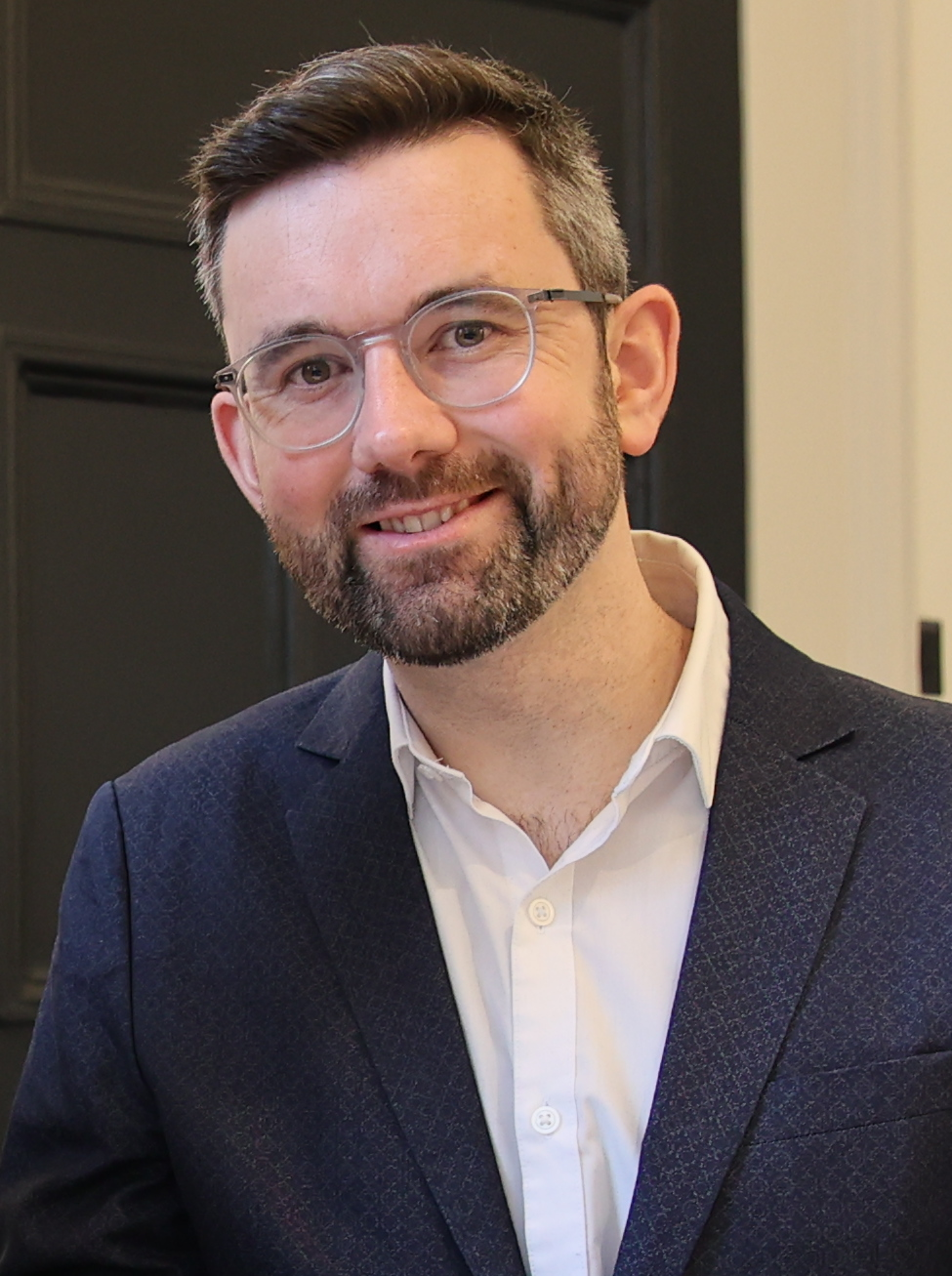
- Rice in 2024

Teachta Dála
- Incumbent
- Assumed office November 2024
- Constituency: Cork South-Central

Personal details
- Born: 1990 (age 35–36) Ireland
- Party: Social Democrats
- Spouse: Aaron O'Sullivan
- Education: University College Cork; University of Oxford

Pádraig Rice (born 1990) is an Irish Social Democrats politician who has been a Teachta Dála (TD) for the Cork South-Central constituency since the 2024 general election. Rice was a member of Cork City Council for the Cork City South Central area from June to November 2024, becoming the first Social Democrat to sit on the council.

== Early life and education ==
Rice was born in 1990 and raised in Camp, County Kerry. In 2008 he moved to Cork to study at University College Cork (UCC), where he became involved in the LGBTQ+ community. In 2013, Rice graduated from UCC with a First Class Honours BSc in International Development and Food Policy. He was awarded the Peel Memorial Prize for Outstanding Contribution to University Life. After completing a Masters in Public Policy at the University of Oxford, he subsequently returned to UCC where he completed a law degree in 2023.

== Political and social activism ==
As an undergraduate at UCC, Rice served as chairperson of the LGBT Society, and later, president of UCC Societies Guild. He was also the Welfare Officer for UCC Students' Union and was involved in the Students for Marriage Equality Campaign leading up to the 2015 marriage equality referendum.

Rice worked as the coordinator of the Gay Project, a community project in Cork City from 2018 to 2020. During his tenure, he helped establish several new LGBTQI+ community groups and support services, including Cork Frontrunners, the Gold Over 55s group, and the OUTLit Bookclub. Rice was also involved in the movement to repeal the Eighth Amendment of the Constitution as Secretary of Cork Together for Yes and organised LGBT+ for Yes events. Additionally, Rice served as a committee member of Cork Pride, a member of the Gay Health Network, and as a board member of LGBT Ireland.

In March 2023, Rice, representing the LGBT Ireland organisation, spoke to the Oireachtas as part of the Coalition Against Hate Crime (an umbrella organisation for 22 civil society organisations). He highlighted a rise in homophobic violence in Ireland, including the 2021 knife assault on a trans woman, the murders of Aidan Moffitt and Michael Snee, and other assaults.

Rice has also worked with Trócaire in Uganda and as a political advisor and parliamentary assistant, first with senator Colette Kelleher and with TD Cian O'Callaghan.

== Cork City Council (June–November 2024) ==
Rice was elected to Cork City Council in June 2024, with more than 10% of the first preference vote, becoming the first Social Democrat to sit on the council. He focused on housing affordability and dereliction, social infrastructure improvements, accessibility, and climate action.

Rice successfully brought forward a motion which committed Cork City Council to using factual and accurate information, based on credible sources, in council discussions. He also proposed a new city park.

In March 2023 Rice put forward a motion which would commit Cork City Council to a 20% annual increase in tree planting over the next five years to combat climate change and enhance the city's biodiversity.

Niamh O'Connor was co-opted to his Council seat following his election to the Dáil.

== TD (2024- present) ==
Rice was elected for Cork South-Central at the 2024 general election.

In January 2025, Rice was announced as the Social Democrats spokesperson for health. He is an advocate for the full implementation of Sláintecare. Rice has criticised the "unsustainable" housing policies employed by the government, citing the record level homelessness figures in the country.

In April 2025, Rice was announced as the new Chairperson of the Oireachtas Health Committee.

== Political views ==
Rice is an advocate of secularism. In August 2024 Rice called for the removal of prayers and religious iconography, including a crucifix, from Cork City Council meetings. He expressed his surprise that such practices were still part of council proceedings, arguing that Ireland is a democracy, not a theocracy.

== Personal life ==
Rice lives in Ballyphehane with his husband Aaron O'Sullivan. Rice is a peace commissioner, an honorary appointment made by the Department of Justice.

Dáil	Election	Deputy (Party)	Deputy (Party)	Deputy (Party)	Deputy (Party)	Deputy (Party)
22nd	1981	Eileen Desmond (Lab)	Gene Fitzgerald (FF)	Pearse Wyse (FF)	Hugh Coveney (FG)	Peter Barry (FG)
23rd	1982 (Feb)	Eileen Desmond (Lab)	Gene Fitzgerald (FF)	Pearse Wyse (FF)	Jim Corr (FG)	Peter Barry (FG)
24th	1982 (Nov)	Eileen Desmond (Lab)	Gene Fitzgerald (FF)	Pearse Wyse (FF)	Hugh Coveney (FG)	Peter Barry (FG)
25th	1987	Toddy O'Sullivan (Lab)	John Dennehy (FF)	Batt O'Keeffe (FF)	Pearse Wyse (PDs)	Peter Barry (FG)
26th	1989	Toddy O'Sullivan (Lab)	John Dennehy (FF)	Micheál Martin (FF)	Pearse Wyse (PDs)	Peter Barry (FG)
27th	1992	Toddy O'Sullivan (Lab)	Batt O'Keeffe (FF)	Micheál Martin (FF)	Pat Cox (PDs)	Peter Barry (FG)
27th	1994 by-election	Toddy O'Sullivan (Lab)	Batt O'Keeffe (FF)	Micheál Martin (FF)	Hugh Coveney (FG)	Peter Barry (FG)
28th	1997	John Dennehy (FF)	Batt O'Keeffe (FF)	Micheál Martin (FF)	Hugh Coveney (FG)	Deirdre Clune (FG)
28th	1998 by-election	John Dennehy (FF)	Batt O'Keeffe (FF)	Micheál Martin (FF)	Simon Coveney (FG)	Deirdre Clune (FG)
29th	2002	John Dennehy (FF)	Batt O'Keeffe (FF)	Micheál Martin (FF)	Simon Coveney (FG)	Dan Boyle (GP)
30th	2007	Ciarán Lynch (Lab)	Michael McGrath (FF)	Micheál Martin (FF)	Simon Coveney (FG)	Deirdre Clune (FG)
31st	2011	Ciarán Lynch (Lab)	Michael McGrath (FF)	Micheál Martin (FF)	Simon Coveney (FG)	Jerry Buttimer (FG)
32nd	2016	Donnchadh Ó Laoghaire (SF)	Michael McGrath (FF)	Micheál Martin (FF)	Simon Coveney (FG)	4 seats 2016–2024
33rd	2020	Donnchadh Ó Laoghaire (SF)	Michael McGrath (FF)	Micheál Martin (FF)	Simon Coveney (FG)	4 seats 2016–2024
34th	2024	Donnchadh Ó Laoghaire (SF)	Séamus McGrath (FF)	Micheál Martin (FF)	Jerry Buttimer (FG)	Pádraig Rice (SD)
