= Pat Cox =

Irish former politician (born 1952)

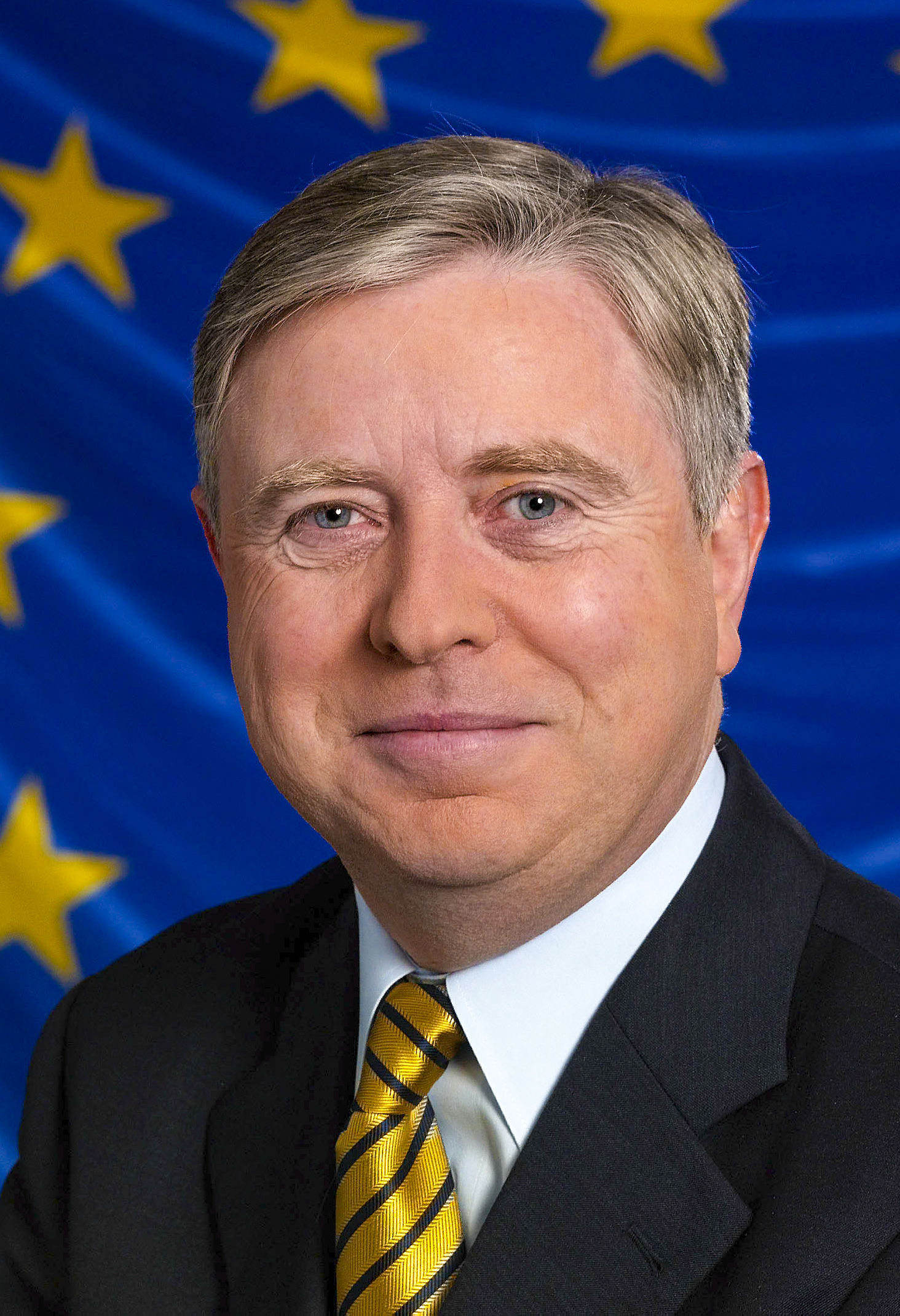
- Official portrait, 2002

President of the European Parliament
- In office 15 January 2002 – 20 July 2004
- Vice President: Gérard Onesta
- Preceded by: Nicole Fontaine
- Succeeded by: Josep Borrell

Leader of the European Liberal Democrat and Reform Party Group
- In office 1 June 1998 – 15 January 2002
- Preceded by: Gijs de Vries
- Succeeded by: Graham Watson

Member of the European Parliament
- In office 25 July 1989 – 20 July 2004
- Constituency: Munster

Teachta Dála
- In office November 1992 – 17 July 1994
- Constituency: Cork South-Central

Personal details
- Born: Patrick Cox; 28 November 1952 (age 73) Dublin, Ireland
- Party: Fine Gael
- Other political affiliations: Progressive Democrats (1985–1994); ELDR (1994–2004)
- Spouse: Cathy Cox (m. 1987)
- Children: 6
- Education: University of Limerick; Trinity College Dublin

Patrick Cox (born 28 November 1952) is an Irish former Fine Gael politician, journalist and television current affairs presenter who served as President of the European Parliament from 2002 to 2004 and Leader of the European Liberal Democrat and Reform Party Group from 1998 to 2002. He served as a Member of the European Parliament (MEP) for the Munster constituency from 1989 to 2004 and a Teachta Dála (TD) for Cork South-Central from 1992 to 1994.

Cox was a presenter with RTÉ's Today Tonight.

== Early and personal life ==
Cox was born in Dublin in 1952, but raised in Limerick. He was then educated at Ardscoil Rís in Limerick, the University of Limerick and Trinity College Dublin. He is married to Cathy, and lived at Ashboro, Shanakiel in the Cork north side suburb of Sunday's Well for 16 years.

== Early career ==
Cox first came to prominence as a journalist, then a presenter with RTÉ's Today Tonight, a four-nights-a-week current affairs programme which dominated the Irish television schedules in the 1980s. He left the programme to become a political candidate.

== Political career ==
=== Career in national politics ===
Cox stood as a Fianna Fáil candidate at the 1979 local elections.

=== Member of the European Parliament, 1989–2004 ===
Cox was elected an MEP in 1989 for the constituency of Munster, representing the Progressive Democrats (PDs). During his first term, he served on the Committee on Economic and Monetary Affairs and Industrial Policy.

At the 1992 general election, Cox was also elected to Dáil Éireann as a TD for Cork South-Central. Following Desmond O'Malley's retirement from the party leadership in 1993, Cox stood for election to the post but was beaten by Mary Harney. He became deputy leader.

Cox left the PDs in May 1994 in a dispute over his seat as an MEP. It was expected that Cox would not contest his seat in the 1994 European election; Des O'Malley, who had a large Munster base in Limerick city and County Limerick, was selected as the party candidate. However, Cox then decided to contest the seat as an independent, beating O'Malley. On being elected, he resigned his Dáil seat, and a by-election was held on 10 November 1994, which was won by Fine Gael. He subsequently served on the Committee on Institutional Affairs from 1994 until 1997 and on the Committee on Economic and Monetary Affairs and Industrial Policy from 1997 until 1999. In addition to his committee assignments, he was a member of the Parliament's Delegation for relations with South Africa.

When incumbent Gijs de Vries stepped down to enter the government of Prime Minister Wim Kok of the Netherlands, Cox was elected president of the ELDR group in the European Parliament in 1998, becoming the first Irishman to lead a political group in the Parliament. He subsequently played a key role in the fall of the Santer Commission by consistently – and loudly – calling for the Commissioners to resign.

Cox was unanimously re-elected Group President in June 1999, following his re-election as an MEP at the 1999 European Parliament election. He resigned this post when he became President of the European Parliament on 15 January 2002, in accordance with an agreement between the European People's Party (Christian Democrats) and the ELDR groups at the start of the term (in the customary two-way split of the five-year Presidency of the European Parliament). He succeeded the Frenchwoman Nicole Fontaine. At his first press conference following his election as president he spoke positively of direct talks between the Cypriot President Glafcos Clerides and Turkish Cypriot President Rauf Denktaş.

In July 2003, Cox took a personal telephone apology from Prime Minister Silvio Berlusconi after Berlusconi managed to offend several MEPs. The controversy arose after Berlusconi compared a German MEP to a Nazi concentration camp commandant.

Cox did not contest the 2004 elections to the European parliament. The Christian Democrats (European People's Party – EPP) and Socialist Groups agreed on the customary two-way split of the Presidency of the European Parliament. Josep Borrell Fontelles, a Spanish Socialist, assumed the Presidency on 20 July 2004, holding it until 15 January 2007.

== Later career ==
Cox is a member of the Comite d'Honneur of the Institute of European Affairs. In 2006, he was elected President of European Movement, an international pro-European lobby association. In June 2009, Pat Cox temporarily stepped down as president and took over the position of the campaign director for the pro-Lisbon treaty initiative Ireland for Europe. He resigned as president of the European Movement in May 2013.

Also in 2009, Cox co-founded the European Privacy Association.

On 15 September 2010, Cox supported the new initiative Spinelli Group, which was founded to reinvigorate the drive toward federalisation of the European Union (EU). Other prominent supporters include Jacques Delors, Daniel Cohn-Bendit, Guy Verhofstadt, Andrew Duff and Elmar Brok.

In June 2011, Irish media reported that Cox, who had previously said he wanted to stand as an independent candidate in 2011's Irish presidential election, was seeking to join Fine Gael to get the party's nomination. Fine Gael's national executive on 16 June 2011 approved his application to join the party's St Luke's branch in Cork. In July 2011, Gay Mitchell became the Fine Gael candidate. Before that, Cox was "pleased" to help prepare Fine Gael's first-100-day strategy after it won the 2011 general election.

Between 2012 and 2014, Cox and Aleksander Kwaśniewski led a European Parliament monitoring mission in Ukraine to monitor the criminal cases against Yulia Tymoshenko, Yuriy Lutsenko and Valeriy Ivaschenko.

== Other activities ==
=== International organizations ===
- European Investment Bank (EIB), Member of the Appointment Advisory Committee (since 2017)

=== Corporate boards ===
- Appian Asset Management, Member of the Board
- Ecocem, Member of the Board, Chair of the Board (since 2021)
- European Integration Solutions LLC, Managing Partner (since 2005)
- KPMG, Chairman of the Public Interest Committee
- Liberty Global, Member of the European Advisory Council
- Michelin, Member of the supervisory board (since 2005)

=== Non-profit organizations ===
- Institute of International and European Affairs (IIEA), Member of the Board
- Jean Monnet Foundation for Europe, President (since 2015)
- Yalta European Strategy (YES), Member
- European Movement International, President (2005–2011)
- Limerick National City of Culture, Chair (2013–2014)

== Recognition ==
On 20 May 2004, Cox was awarded the Charlemagne Prize (Karlspreis) for his achievements with regard to the enlargement of the European Union and for his work in promoting greater EU democratisation.

In addition, he is a recipient of the Grand Cross of the Order of the Star of Romania and a Knight Grand Cross of the Order of Merit of the Italian Republic.

Political offices
| Preceded by Nicole Fontaine | President of the European Parliament; 2002–2004 | Succeeded by Josep Borrell |

| Dáil | Election | Deputy (Party) | Deputy (Party) | Deputy (Party) | Deputy (Party) | Deputy (Party) |
|---|---|---|---|---|---|---|
| 22nd | 1981 | Eileen Desmond (Lab) | Gene Fitzgerald (FF) | Pearse Wyse (FF) | Hugh Coveney (FG) | Peter Barry (FG) |
| 23rd | 1982 (Feb) | Eileen Desmond (Lab) | Gene Fitzgerald (FF) | Pearse Wyse (FF) | Jim Corr (FG) | Peter Barry (FG) |
| 24th | 1982 (Nov) | Eileen Desmond (Lab) | Gene Fitzgerald (FF) | Pearse Wyse (FF) | Hugh Coveney (FG) | Peter Barry (FG) |
| 25th | 1987 | Toddy O'Sullivan (Lab) | John Dennehy (FF) | Batt O'Keeffe (FF) | Pearse Wyse (PDs) | Peter Barry (FG) |
| 26th | 1989 | Toddy O'Sullivan (Lab) | John Dennehy (FF) | Micheál Martin (FF) | Pearse Wyse (PDs) | Peter Barry (FG) |
| 27th | 1992 | Toddy O'Sullivan (Lab) | Batt O'Keeffe (FF) | Micheál Martin (FF) | Pat Cox (PDs) | Peter Barry (FG) |
| 27th | 1994 by-election | Toddy O'Sullivan (Lab) | Batt O'Keeffe (FF) | Micheál Martin (FF) | Hugh Coveney (FG) | Peter Barry (FG) |
| 28th | 1997 | John Dennehy (FF) | Batt O'Keeffe (FF) | Micheál Martin (FF) | Hugh Coveney (FG) | Deirdre Clune (FG) |
| 28th | 1998 by-election | John Dennehy (FF) | Batt O'Keeffe (FF) | Micheál Martin (FF) | Simon Coveney (FG) | Deirdre Clune (FG) |
| 29th | 2002 | John Dennehy (FF) | Batt O'Keeffe (FF) | Micheál Martin (FF) | Simon Coveney (FG) | Dan Boyle (GP) |
| 30th | 2007 | Ciarán Lynch (Lab) | Michael McGrath (FF) | Micheál Martin (FF) | Simon Coveney (FG) | Deirdre Clune (FG) |
| 31st | 2011 | Ciarán Lynch (Lab) | Michael McGrath (FF) | Micheál Martin (FF) | Simon Coveney (FG) | Jerry Buttimer (FG) |
| 32nd | 2016 | Donnchadh Ó Laoghaire (SF) | Michael McGrath (FF) | Micheál Martin (FF) | Simon Coveney (FG) | 4 seats 2016–2024 |
| 33rd | 2020 | Donnchadh Ó Laoghaire (SF) | Michael McGrath (FF) | Micheál Martin (FF) | Simon Coveney (FG) | 4 seats 2016–2024 |
| 34th | 2024 | Donnchadh Ó Laoghaire (SF) | Séamus McGrath (FF) | Micheál Martin (FF) | Jerry Buttimer (FG) | Pádraig Rice (SD) |
