= Hugh Coveney =

Irish politician (1935–1998)

Minister of State
- 1995–1997: Finance

Minister for the Marine
- In office 15 December 1994 – 23 May 1995
- Taoiseach: John Bruton
- Preceded by: David Andrews
- Succeeded by: Seán Barrett

Minister for Defence
- In office 15 December 1994 – 23 May 1995
- Taoiseach: John Bruton
- Preceded by: David Andrews
- Succeeded by: Seán Barrett

Teachta Dála
- In office November 1994 – 14 March 1998
- In office November 1982 – February 1987
- In office June 1981 – February 1982
- Constituency: Cork South-Central

Personal details
- Born: 20 July 1935 Cork, Ireland
- Died: 14 March 1998 (aged 62) Crosshaven, County Cork, Ireland
- Party: Fine Gael
- Spouse: Pauline Brown (m. 1969)
- Children: 7, including Simon
- Education: College of Estate Management

Hugh Coveney (20 July 1935 – 14 March 1998) was an Irish Fine Gael politician who served as Minister of State at the Department of Finance from 1996 to 1997, Minister for the Marine and Minister for Defence from 1994 to 1995 and Lord Mayor of Cork from 1982 to 1983. He served as a Teachta Dála (TD) for the Cork South-Central constituency from 1981 to 1982, 1982 to 1987 and 1994 to 1998.

== Early life ==
Coveney was born into one of Cork's prosperous "merchant prince" families in 1935. He was educated at Christian Brothers College, Cork, Clongowes Wood College and the College of Estate Management, London. He worked as a chartered quantity surveyor in his father's surveying firm, Patrick F. Coveney Associates (later P. F. Coveney & Son). He was subsequently a fellow of the Royal Institution of Chartered Surveyors. He married Pauline Brown in 1969; and they had six sons and one daughter.

== Political career ==
Coveney served as Lord Mayor of Cork from 1982 to 1983. He was first elected to Dáil Éireann as a Fine Gael TD for the Cork South-Central constituency at the 1981 general election. He lost his seat in the first general election of 1982 but regained it in the second election in the same year. He lost his seat again at the 1987 general election and did not contest the 1989 or 1992 general elections. He was elected to the Dáil again in the 1994 Cork South-Central by-election caused by the resignation of the Progressive Democrats TD Pat Cox.

He was appointed to cabinet in December 1994 under Taoiseach John Bruton as Minister for Defence and Minister for the Marine. However, he was demoted to a junior ministry in May 1995 after allegations of improper contact with businessmen. It was revealed that he had made a telephone call to Bord Gáis asking that his family firm be considered for a state contract.

== Yachting ==
Coveney's yacht Golden Apple of The Sun (designed by Cork-based designer Ron Holland) was a successful competitor in the Admiral's Cup in the 1970s.

A later 50-foot (15 m) yacht Golden Apple was used by the family for the "Sail Chernobyl" project. The family sailed around the world to raise €650,000 for the Chernobyl Children's Project, a charity which offers assistance to children affected by the 1986 Chernobyl disaster.

== Death ==
In March 1998, it became publicly known that the Moriarty Tribunal had questioned Coveney about whether he had a secret offshore account with Ansbacher Bank, a bank which had become notorious for facilitating tax-evasion. Ten days later, on 13 March 1998, Coveney visited his solicitor to change his will. The next day, 14 March 1998, Coveney died in a fall from a seaside cliff while out walking alone. His son, Simon Coveney, insisted that his father had never held an Ansbacher account. It later emerged that Hugh Coveney had $175,000 on deposit in the secret Cayman Island-based bank. The account was closed in 1979.

His son, Simon, was elected a TD to succeed his father in the resulting by-election on 3 November 1998.

== See also ==
- Families in the Oireachtas

Civic offices
Preceded by Paud Black	Lord Mayor of Cork; 1982	Succeeded by John Dennehy
Political offices
Preceded by David Andrews	Minister for Defence; 1994–1995	Succeeded by Seán Barrett
Preceded by David Andrews	Minister for the Marine; 1994–1995	Succeeded by Seán Barrett
Preceded by Jim Higgins	Minister of State at the Department of Finance; 1995–1997	Succeeded by Martin Cullen

Dáil	Election	Deputy (Party)	Deputy (Party)	Deputy (Party)	Deputy (Party)	Deputy (Party)
22nd	1981	Eileen Desmond (Lab)	Gene Fitzgerald (FF)	Pearse Wyse (FF)	Hugh Coveney (FG)	Peter Barry (FG)
23rd	1982 (Feb)	Eileen Desmond (Lab)	Gene Fitzgerald (FF)	Pearse Wyse (FF)	Jim Corr (FG)	Peter Barry (FG)
24th	1982 (Nov)	Eileen Desmond (Lab)	Gene Fitzgerald (FF)	Pearse Wyse (FF)	Hugh Coveney (FG)	Peter Barry (FG)
25th	1987	Toddy O'Sullivan (Lab)	John Dennehy (FF)	Batt O'Keeffe (FF)	Pearse Wyse (PDs)	Peter Barry (FG)
26th	1989	Toddy O'Sullivan (Lab)	John Dennehy (FF)	Micheál Martin (FF)	Pearse Wyse (PDs)	Peter Barry (FG)
27th	1992	Toddy O'Sullivan (Lab)	Batt O'Keeffe (FF)	Micheál Martin (FF)	Pat Cox (PDs)	Peter Barry (FG)
27th	1994 by-election	Toddy O'Sullivan (Lab)	Batt O'Keeffe (FF)	Micheál Martin (FF)	Hugh Coveney (FG)	Peter Barry (FG)
28th	1997	John Dennehy (FF)	Batt O'Keeffe (FF)	Micheál Martin (FF)	Hugh Coveney (FG)	Deirdre Clune (FG)
28th	1998 by-election	John Dennehy (FF)	Batt O'Keeffe (FF)	Micheál Martin (FF)	Simon Coveney (FG)	Deirdre Clune (FG)
29th	2002	John Dennehy (FF)	Batt O'Keeffe (FF)	Micheál Martin (FF)	Simon Coveney (FG)	Dan Boyle (GP)
30th	2007	Ciarán Lynch (Lab)	Michael McGrath (FF)	Micheál Martin (FF)	Simon Coveney (FG)	Deirdre Clune (FG)
31st	2011	Ciarán Lynch (Lab)	Michael McGrath (FF)	Micheál Martin (FF)	Simon Coveney (FG)	Jerry Buttimer (FG)
32nd	2016	Donnchadh Ó Laoghaire (SF)	Michael McGrath (FF)	Micheál Martin (FF)	Simon Coveney (FG)	4 seats 2016–2024
33rd	2020	Donnchadh Ó Laoghaire (SF)	Michael McGrath (FF)	Micheál Martin (FF)	Simon Coveney (FG)	4 seats 2016–2024
34th	2024	Donnchadh Ó Laoghaire (SF)	Séamus McGrath (FF)	Micheál Martin (FF)	Jerry Buttimer (FG)	Pádraig Rice (SD)
