= John Dennehy =

Irish former politician (born 1940)

Teachta Dála
- In office June 1997 – May 2007
- In office February 1987 – November 1992
- Constituency: Cork South-Central

Personal details
- Born: 22 March 1940 (age 86) Cork, Ireland
- Party: Fianna Fáil

John Dennehy (born 22 March 1940) is an Irish former Fianna Fáil politician. He was a Teachta Dála (TD) for the Cork South-Central constituency.

== Early life ==
Dennehy was educated at Sharman Crawford Technical Institute and Cork College of Commerce. A fitter by trade, Dennehy spent most of his working life with Irish Steel in Haulbowline until he went full-time into politics.

== Career ==
Dennehy was elected to Cork City Council for the South–West area in 1974 and subsequently re-elected at every election until he resigned from the council in 2003 due to the dual mandate rule. He was Lord Mayor of Cork from 1983 to 1984.

He stood unsuccessfully at the 1977 general election for the Cork Mid constituency, and in 1979 he was narrowly defeated in a by-election for the Cork City constituency by Fine Gael's Liam Burke in one of a string of by-election defeats for the Fianna Fáil government.

Dennehy was first elected to Dáil Éireann at the 1987 general election but lost his seat to party colleague Batt O'Keeffe at the 1992 general election. He regained his seat at the 1997 general election and narrowly held it by 6 votes against a challenge from Kathy Sinnott at the 2002 general election. He lost his seat at the 2007 general election.

Civic offices
Preceded by Hugh Coveney	Lord Mayor of Cork; 1983–1984	Succeeded by Liam Burke

Dáil	Election	Deputy (Party)	Deputy (Party)	Deputy (Party)	Deputy (Party)	Deputy (Party)
22nd	1981	Eileen Desmond (Lab)	Gene Fitzgerald (FF)	Pearse Wyse (FF)	Hugh Coveney (FG)	Peter Barry (FG)
23rd	1982 (Feb)	Eileen Desmond (Lab)	Gene Fitzgerald (FF)	Pearse Wyse (FF)	Jim Corr (FG)	Peter Barry (FG)
24th	1982 (Nov)	Eileen Desmond (Lab)	Gene Fitzgerald (FF)	Pearse Wyse (FF)	Hugh Coveney (FG)	Peter Barry (FG)
25th	1987	Toddy O'Sullivan (Lab)	John Dennehy (FF)	Batt O'Keeffe (FF)	Pearse Wyse (PDs)	Peter Barry (FG)
26th	1989	Toddy O'Sullivan (Lab)	John Dennehy (FF)	Micheál Martin (FF)	Pearse Wyse (PDs)	Peter Barry (FG)
27th	1992	Toddy O'Sullivan (Lab)	Batt O'Keeffe (FF)	Micheál Martin (FF)	Pat Cox (PDs)	Peter Barry (FG)
27th	1994 by-election	Toddy O'Sullivan (Lab)	Batt O'Keeffe (FF)	Micheál Martin (FF)	Hugh Coveney (FG)	Peter Barry (FG)
28th	1997	John Dennehy (FF)	Batt O'Keeffe (FF)	Micheál Martin (FF)	Hugh Coveney (FG)	Deirdre Clune (FG)
28th	1998 by-election	John Dennehy (FF)	Batt O'Keeffe (FF)	Micheál Martin (FF)	Simon Coveney (FG)	Deirdre Clune (FG)
29th	2002	John Dennehy (FF)	Batt O'Keeffe (FF)	Micheál Martin (FF)	Simon Coveney (FG)	Dan Boyle (GP)
30th	2007	Ciarán Lynch (Lab)	Michael McGrath (FF)	Micheál Martin (FF)	Simon Coveney (FG)	Deirdre Clune (FG)
31st	2011	Ciarán Lynch (Lab)	Michael McGrath (FF)	Micheál Martin (FF)	Simon Coveney (FG)	Jerry Buttimer (FG)
32nd	2016	Donnchadh Ó Laoghaire (SF)	Michael McGrath (FF)	Micheál Martin (FF)	Simon Coveney (FG)	4 seats 2016–2024
33rd	2020	Donnchadh Ó Laoghaire (SF)	Michael McGrath (FF)	Micheál Martin (FF)	Simon Coveney (FG)	4 seats 2016–2024
34th	2024	Donnchadh Ó Laoghaire (SF)	Séamus McGrath (FF)	Micheál Martin (FF)	Jerry Buttimer (FG)	Pádraig Rice (SD)
