= Dan Boyle (politician) =

Irish politician (born 1962)

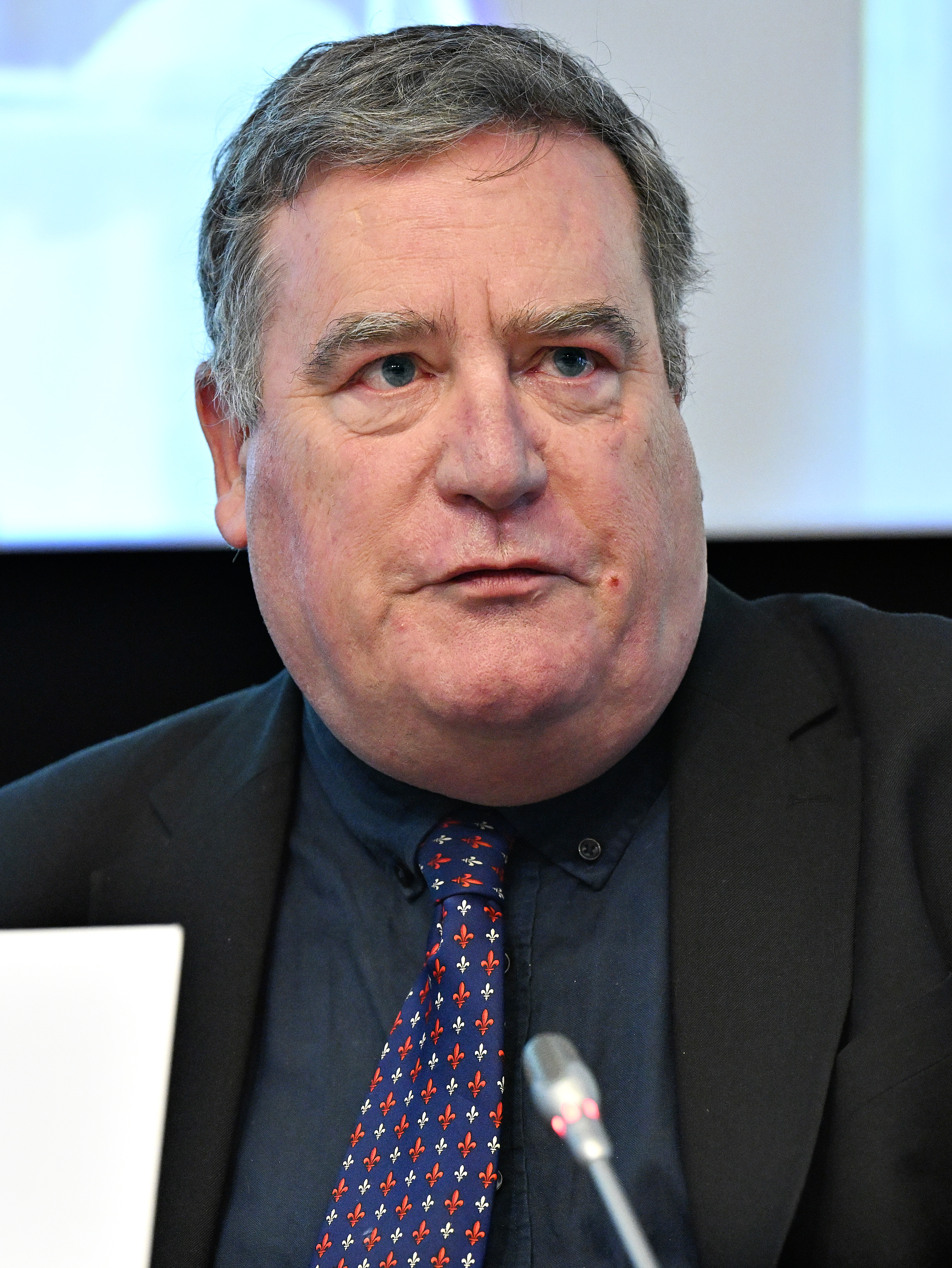
- Boyle in 2023

Lord Mayor of Cork
- In office June 2024 – June 2025
- Preceded by: Kieran McCarthy
- Succeeded by: Fergal Dennehy

Deputy leader of the Seanad
- In office 16 August 2007 – 23 January 2011
- Taoiseach: Brian Cowen
- Leader: Donie Cassidy
- Preceded by: John Dardis
- Succeeded by: Ivana Bacik

Senator
- In office 13 September 2007 – 25 May 2011
- Constituency: Nominated by the Taoiseach

Teachta Dála
- In office June 2002 – June 2007
- Constituency: Cork South-Central

Personal details
- Born: Daniel Boyle; 14 August 1962 (age 63) Chicago, Illinois, U.S.
- Party: Green Party
- Spouse: Bláithín Hurley (m. 1987; div. 2014)
- Children: 1
- Education: Cork Institute of Technology; University College Cork

Daniel Boyle (born 14 August 1962) is an Irish Green Party politician and author who served as Deputy leader of the Seanad from 2007 to 2011. He was a Senator from 2007 to 2011, after being nominated by the Taoiseach. He served as a Teachta Dála (TD) for the Cork South-Central from 2002 to 2007.

He was elected to Cork City Council in May 2019.

== Early life and education ==
Boyle was born in Chicago, Illinois, to emigrant Irish parents. He has lived in his mother's native city of Cork since he was eight years of age, in the Turners Cross area of the city. He was educated at local schools; Scoil Chríost Rí and Coláiste Chríost Rí, and at the Cork Institute of Technology, where he studied Business Studies and Child Care. He received an MBS in Government from University College Cork in 2015. He was married to Bláithín Hurley from 1987 to 2014, they have one daughter.

At the time of the 1992 general election, he had served as a board member of the Cork Youth Federation, the National Youth Federation, and as chair of the National Youth Clubs Council.

== Political career ==
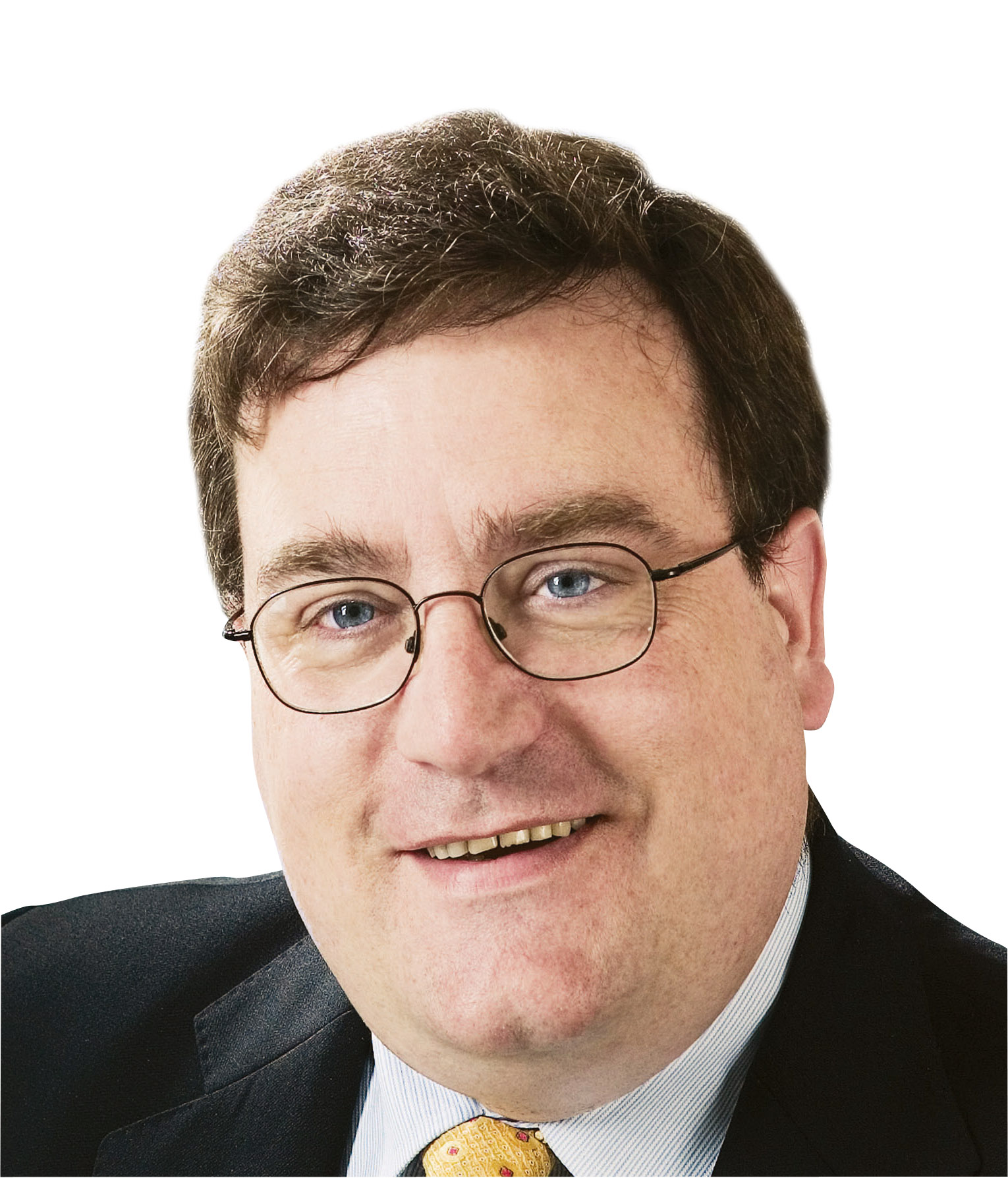
Boyle, circa 2006

In 1991, he won election to Cork City Council, the first Green Party candidate to do so. At the 2002 general election, he was elected to Dáil Éireann for the Cork South-Central constituency. He was the Green Party Spokesperson for Finance, Social and Family Affairs and Community, Rural Development and the Islands during the 29th Dáil. He was also the party whip. In 2002, he resigned his seat on Cork City Council, where he was replaced by Chris O'Leary.

At the 2007 general election, Boyle lost his seat in the Dáil. He was subsequently part of the Green Party team that negotiated a programme that brought the party into the Irish government for the first time in its history. He was nominated by Taoiseach Bertie Ahern to Seanad Éireann as a Senator on 3 August 2007. He was appointed as Deputy leader of the Seanad on 16 August 2007. He succeeded John Gormley as Chair of the Green Party in 2007. He was succeeded in that office by Roderic O'Gorman in 2011.

He was an unsuccessful candidate for the Green Party in the 2009 European Parliament election for the South constituency.

Commenting on Willie O'Dea's defamation case on 17 February 2010, Boyle said that he has "no confidence" in O'Dea and declaring him to be "compromised". On 18 February 2010, O'Dea resigned as Minister for Defence.

He ran for Dáil Éireann in Cork South-Central constituency at the 2011 general election, but failed to get elected. He stood as a candidate in the 2011 Seanad election on the Industrial and Commercial Panel but was not elected. He was an unsuccessful Green Party candidate for Cork City Council at the 2014 local elections. In May 2019, Boyle was elected to Cork City Council for the Cork South Central local electoral area. In November 2019, he sought to have further drive-thru restaurants banned in Cork. The Southern Star reported in October 2020 that Boyle was a voluntary board member of CHA, an Approved Housing Body (2020). He has also served as a board member of the Firkin Crane, the Crawford Art Gallery, Corcadorca Theatre Company, Terence MacSwiney Community College and the Lavitt Gallery. He is currently a board member of Arts at Civic Trust House CLG. He was made a community representative on the Public Participation Network for Cork City Council. Boyle has served as Vice President of the National Youth Council of Ireland and Chair of NASC, the Irish Immigrant Support Agency.

As of 2021, Boyle served on the Board of the Irish Council of Social Housing.

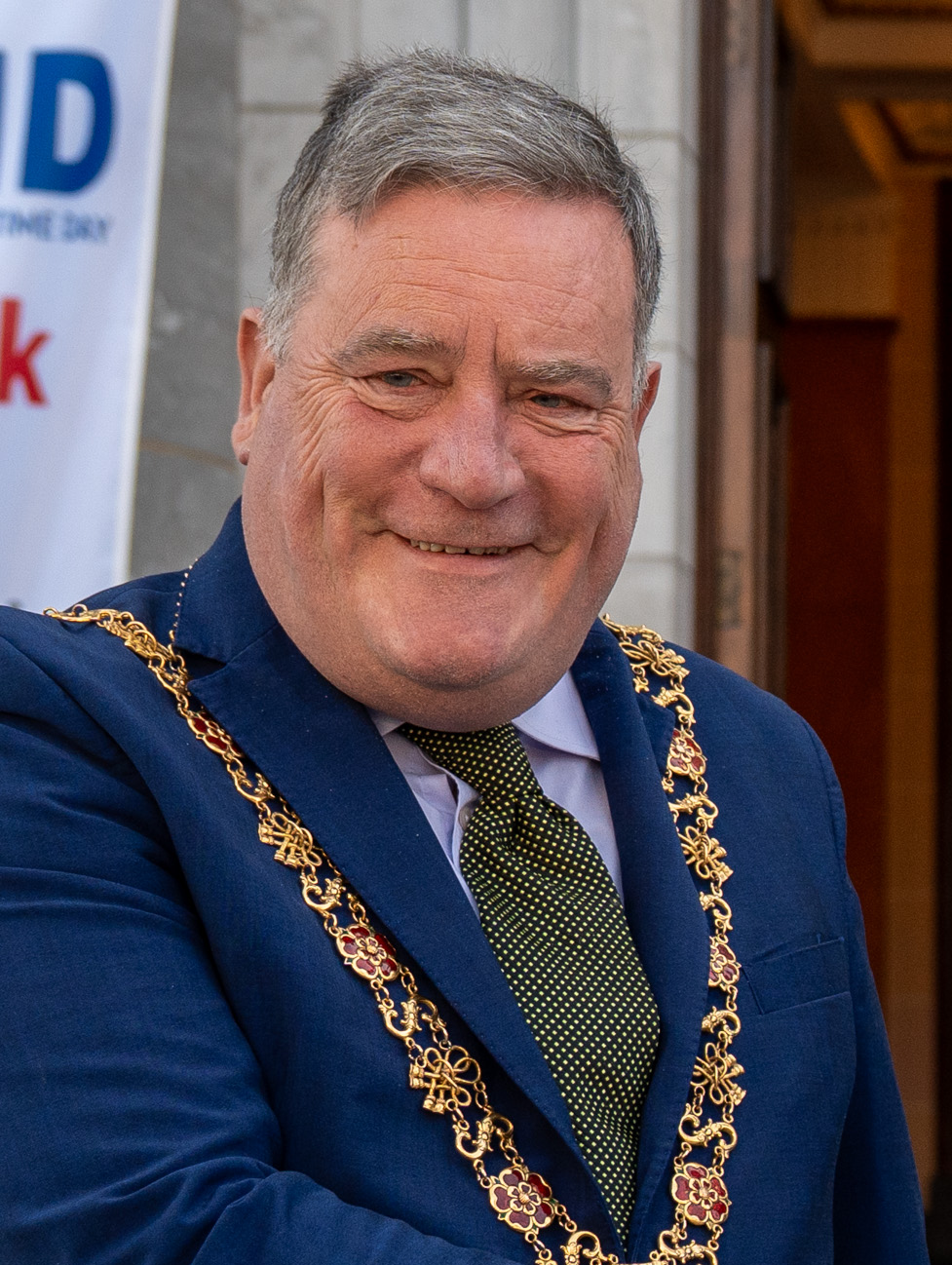
Boyle as Lord Mayor of Cork in 2025

On 21 June 2024, Boyle was elected as Lord Mayor of Cork, the first Green Party lord mayor of Cork city.

== Other work ==
In 2011, he released a music album titled Third Adolescence.

He has authored three books on political history - A Journey to Change (2006); Without Power of Glory (2012) and Making Up The Numbers (2017).

He was later hired by the Wales Green Party in 2015, as their campaign manager for the 2016 Welsh Assembly election. In 2015, he was credited by the Irish Examiner as being the driving force behind the Green Foundation think tank.

Dáil	Election	Deputy (Party)	Deputy (Party)	Deputy (Party)	Deputy (Party)	Deputy (Party)
22nd	1981	Eileen Desmond (Lab)	Gene Fitzgerald (FF)	Pearse Wyse (FF)	Hugh Coveney (FG)	Peter Barry (FG)
23rd	1982 (Feb)	Eileen Desmond (Lab)	Gene Fitzgerald (FF)	Pearse Wyse (FF)	Jim Corr (FG)	Peter Barry (FG)
24th	1982 (Nov)	Eileen Desmond (Lab)	Gene Fitzgerald (FF)	Pearse Wyse (FF)	Hugh Coveney (FG)	Peter Barry (FG)
25th	1987	Toddy O'Sullivan (Lab)	John Dennehy (FF)	Batt O'Keeffe (FF)	Pearse Wyse (PDs)	Peter Barry (FG)
26th	1989	Toddy O'Sullivan (Lab)	John Dennehy (FF)	Micheál Martin (FF)	Pearse Wyse (PDs)	Peter Barry (FG)
27th	1992	Toddy O'Sullivan (Lab)	Batt O'Keeffe (FF)	Micheál Martin (FF)	Pat Cox (PDs)	Peter Barry (FG)
27th	1994 by-election	Toddy O'Sullivan (Lab)	Batt O'Keeffe (FF)	Micheál Martin (FF)	Hugh Coveney (FG)	Peter Barry (FG)
28th	1997	John Dennehy (FF)	Batt O'Keeffe (FF)	Micheál Martin (FF)	Hugh Coveney (FG)	Deirdre Clune (FG)
28th	1998 by-election	John Dennehy (FF)	Batt O'Keeffe (FF)	Micheál Martin (FF)	Simon Coveney (FG)	Deirdre Clune (FG)
29th	2002	John Dennehy (FF)	Batt O'Keeffe (FF)	Micheál Martin (FF)	Simon Coveney (FG)	Dan Boyle (GP)
30th	2007	Ciarán Lynch (Lab)	Michael McGrath (FF)	Micheál Martin (FF)	Simon Coveney (FG)	Deirdre Clune (FG)
31st	2011	Ciarán Lynch (Lab)	Michael McGrath (FF)	Micheál Martin (FF)	Simon Coveney (FG)	Jerry Buttimer (FG)
32nd	2016	Donnchadh Ó Laoghaire (SF)	Michael McGrath (FF)	Micheál Martin (FF)	Simon Coveney (FG)	4 seats 2016–2024
33rd	2020	Donnchadh Ó Laoghaire (SF)	Michael McGrath (FF)	Micheál Martin (FF)	Simon Coveney (FG)	4 seats 2016–2024
34th	2024	Donnchadh Ó Laoghaire (SF)	Séamus McGrath (FF)	Micheál Martin (FF)	Jerry Buttimer (FG)	Pádraig Rice (SD)
