= List of members of the European Parliament for Ireland, 1984–1989 =

This is a list of the 15 members of the European Parliament for Ireland elected at the 1984 European Parliament election. They served in the 1984 to 1989 session.

== List ==
Name	Constituency	National party	EP group
Niall Andrews	Dublin	Fianna Fáil	EDA
Mary Banotti	Dublin	Fine Gael	EPP
Sylvester Barrett	Munster	Fianna Fáil	EDA
Mark Clinton	Leinster	Fine Gael	EPP
Gene Fitzgerald	Munster	Fianna Fáil	EDA
Jim Fitzsimons	Leinster	Fianna Fáil	EDA
Seán Flanagan	Connacht–Ulster	Fianna Fáil	EDA
Patrick Lalor	Leinster	Fianna Fáil	EDA
Eileen Lemass	Dublin	Fianna Fáil	EDA
T. J. Maher	Munster	Independent	ELDR
Joe McCartin	Connacht–Ulster	Fine Gael	EPP
Ray MacSharry	Connacht–Ulster	Fianna Fáil	EDA
Tom Raftery	Munster	Fine Gael	EPP
Richie Ryan†	Dublin	Fine Gael	EPP
Tom O'Donnell	Munster	Fine Gael	EPP

^{†}Replaced during term, see table below for details.

== Changes ==
Party	Outgoing	Constituency	Reason	Date	Replacement
Fine Gael	Richie Ryan	Dublin	Ryan was appointed to the European Court of Auditors	May 1986	Chris O'Malley

== See also ==
- List of members of the European Parliament (1984–1989) – List by country
