= List of members of the European Parliament for Ireland, 1979–1984 =

This is a list of the 15 members of the European Parliament for Ireland elected at the 1979 European Parliament election. They served in the 1979 to 1984 session.

== List ==
Name	Constituency	National party	EP group
Neil Blaney	Connacht–Ulster	Independent Fianna Fáil	CDI
Mark Clinton	Leinster	Fine Gael	EPP
Jerry Cronin†	Munster	Fianna Fáil	EPD
Noel Davern	Munster	Fianna Fáil	EPD
Eileen Desmond†	Munster	Labour	PES
Síle de Valera	Dublin	Fianna Fáil	EPD
Seán Flanagan	Connacht–Ulster	Fianna Fáil	EPD
Liam Kavanagh†	Leinster	Labour	PES
Patrick Lalor	Leinster	Fianna Fáil	EPD
T. J. Maher	Munster	Independent	ELDR
Joe McCartin	Connacht–Ulster	Fine Gael	EPP
John O'Connell†	Dublin	Labour	PES
Tom O'Donnell	Munster	Fine Gael	EPP
Michael O'Leary†	Dublin	Labour	PES
Richie Ryan	Dublin	Fine Gael	EPP

^{†}Replaced during term, see table below for details.

== Changes ==
Party	Outgoing	Constituency	Reason	Date	Replacement
Labour	Eileen Desmond	Munster	Desmond appointed as Minister for Health on 30 June 1981	7 July 1981	Seán Treacy
Labour	Liam Kavanagh	Leinster	Kavanagh appointed as Minister for Labour on 30 June 1981	9 July 1981	Séamus Pattison†
Labour	John O'Connell	Dublin	O'Connell appointed as Ceann Comhairle on 30 June 1981	21 October 1981	John Horgan†
Labour	Michael O'Leary	Dublin	O'Leary appointed as Tánaiste on 30 June 1981	1 July 1981	Frank Cluskey†
Labour	Séamus Pattison	Leinster	Pattison resigned on 15 December 1983	8 February 1984	Justin Keating
Labour	John Horgan	Dublin	Horgan resigned on 1 January 1983	2 March 1983	Flor O'Mahony
Labour	Frank Cluskey	Dublin	Cluskey resigned on 14 December 1982	2 March 1982	Brendan Halligan
Fianna Fáil	Jerry Cronin	Munster	Cronin resigned on 23 May 1984	23 May 1984	None

== See also ==
- List of members of the European Parliament (1979–1984) – List by country
