= List of members of the European Parliament for Ireland, 1989–1994 =

This is a list of the 15 members of the European Parliament for Ireland elected at the 1989 European Parliament election. They served in the 1989 to 1994 session.

== List ==
Name	Constituency	National party	EP group
Niall Andrews	Dublin	Fianna Fáil	EDA
Mary Banotti	Dublin	Fine Gael	EPP
Neil Blaney	Connacht–Ulster	Independent Fianna Fáil	RBW
Patrick Cooney	Leinster	Fine Gael	EPP
Pat Cox	Munster	Progressive Democrats	ELDR
John Cushnahan	Munster	Fine Gael	EPP
Proinsias De Rossa†	Dublin	Workers' Party (Note: Until 11 January 1993 De Rossa was a member of the Workers' Party.)	GUE/NGL (Note: Member until 18 February 1991)
Proinsias De Rossa†	Dublin	Democratic Left	GUE/NGL (Note: Member until 11 January 1993)
Barry Desmond†	Dublin	Labour	PES
Gene Fitzgerald	Munster	Fianna Fáil	EDA
Jim Fitzsimons	Leinster	Fianna Fáil	EDA
Mark Killilea	Connacht–Ulster	Fianna Fáil	EDA
Patrick Lalor	Leinster	Fianna Fáil	EDA
Paddy Lane	Munster	Fianna Fáil	EDA
T. J. Maher	Munster	Independent	ELDR
Joe McCartin	Connacht–Ulster	Fine Gael	EPP

^{†}Replaced during term, see table below for details.

== Changes ==
Party	Outgoing	Constituency	Reason	Date	Replacement
Workers' Party	Proinsias De Rossa	Dublin	Resignation in the run-up to the foundation of Democratic Left	February 1992	Des Geraghty (Note: Member of Non-Inscrits from 11 January 1993)
Labour	Barry Desmond	Dublin	Desmond appointed to the European Court of Auditors	February 1994	Bernie Malone

== See also ==
- List of members of the European Parliament (1989–1994) – List by country
