= 1984 European Parliament election in Ireland =

- 14 June 1984

15 Irish seats to the European Parliament
- Turnout: 1,147,745 (47.6% ▼16.0 pp)
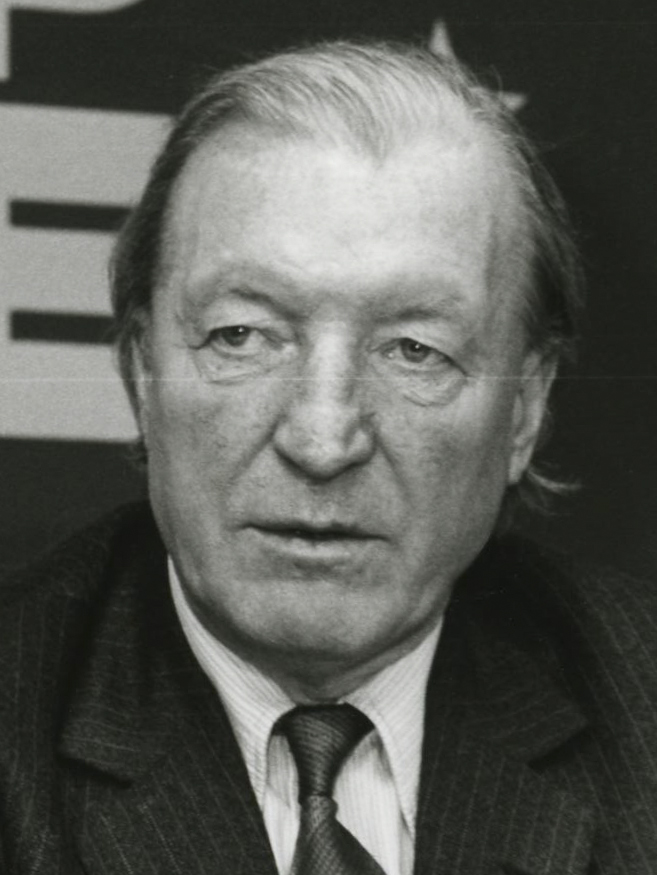

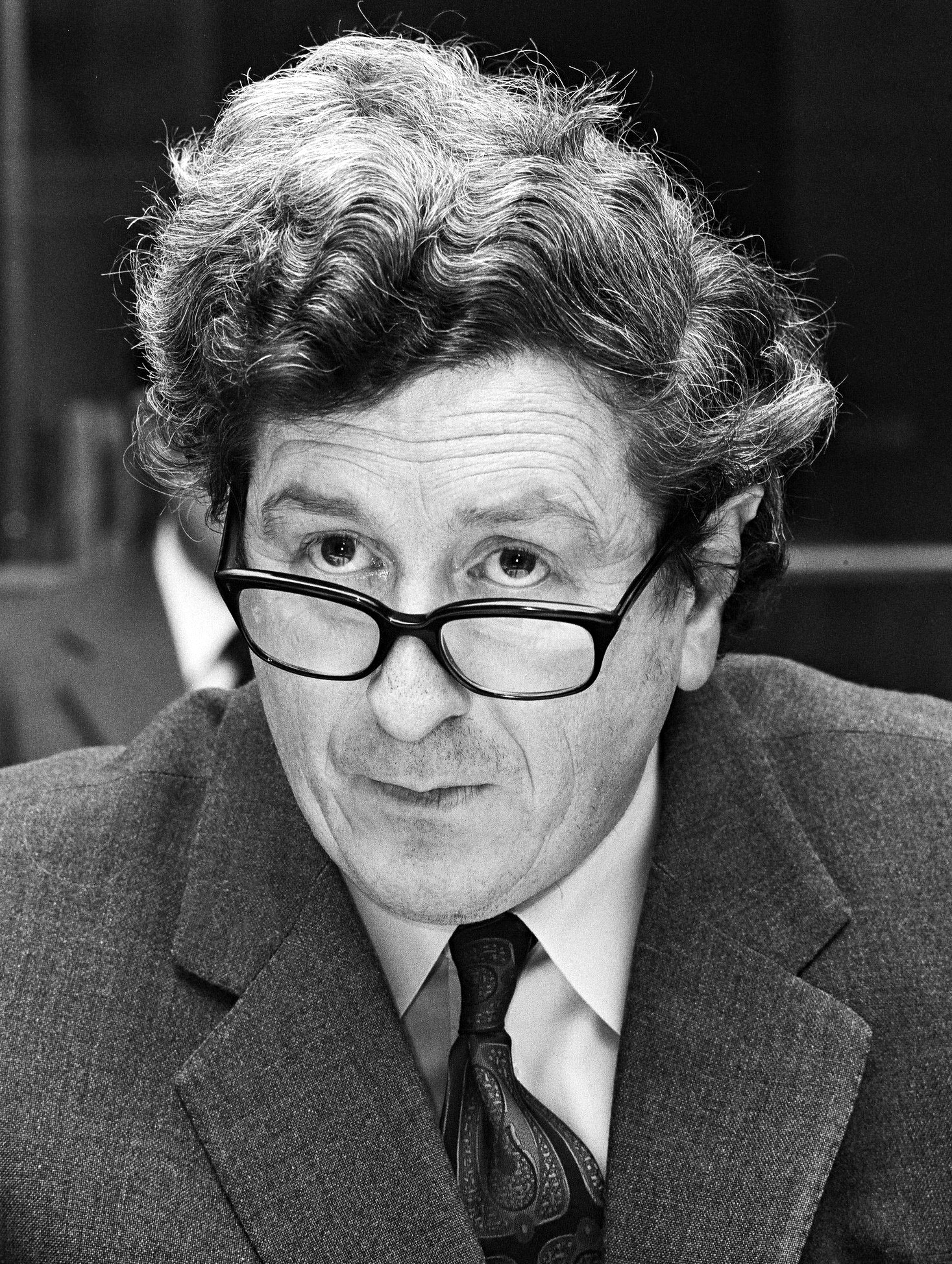

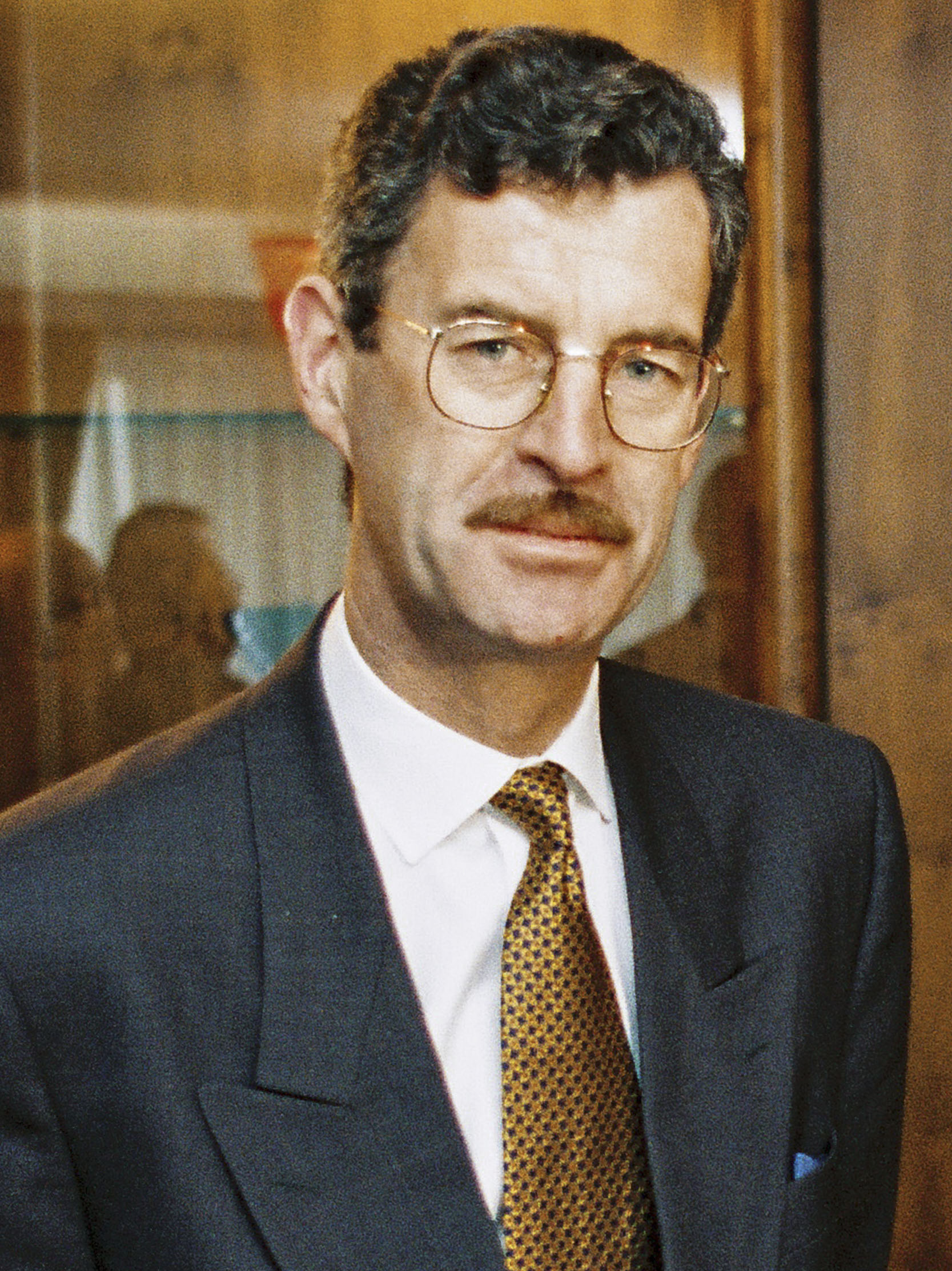

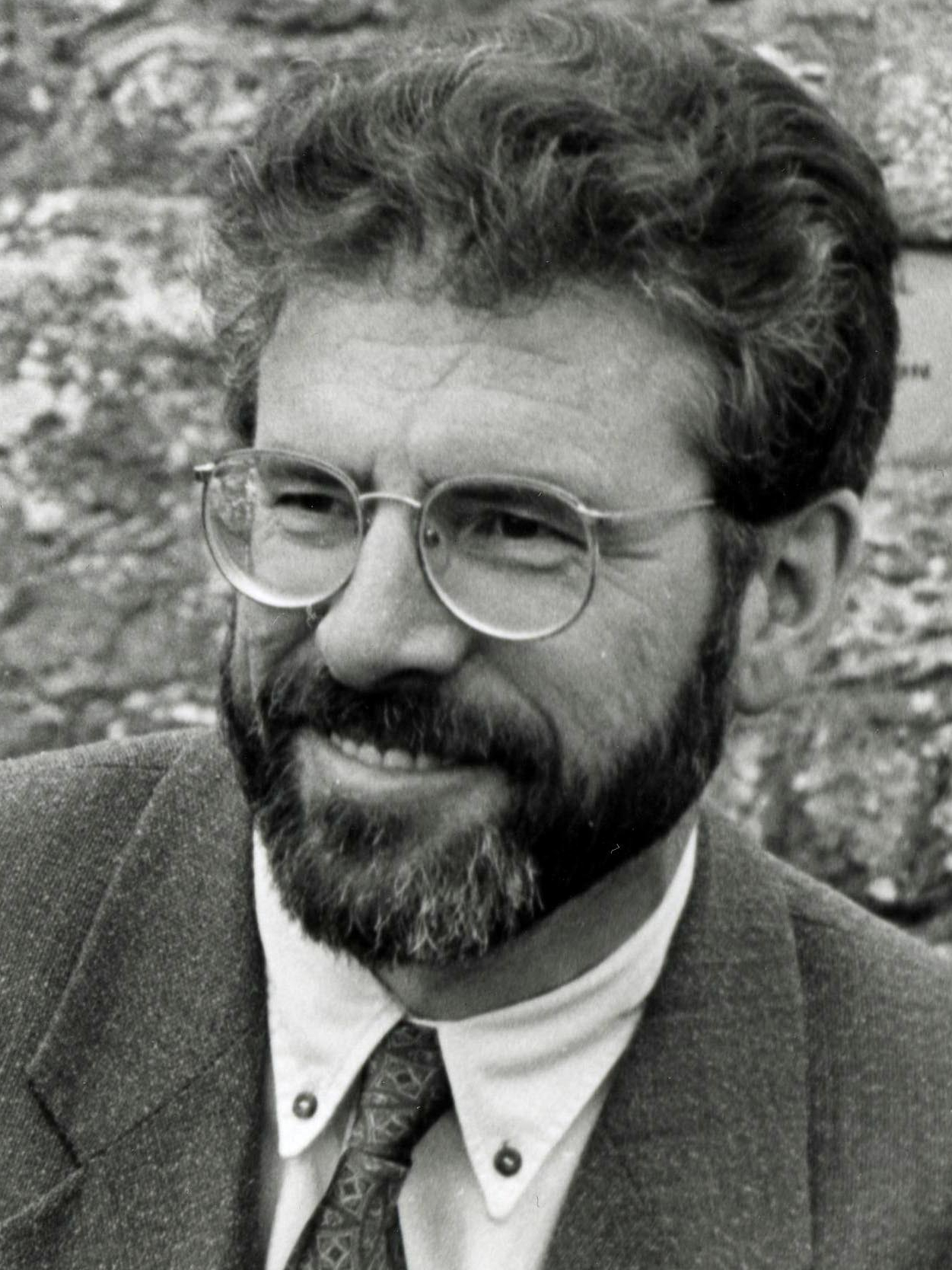

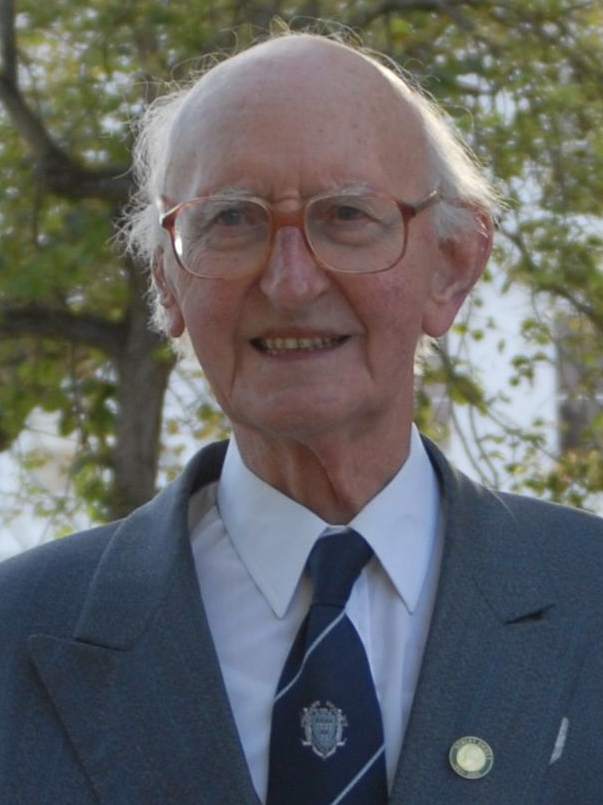

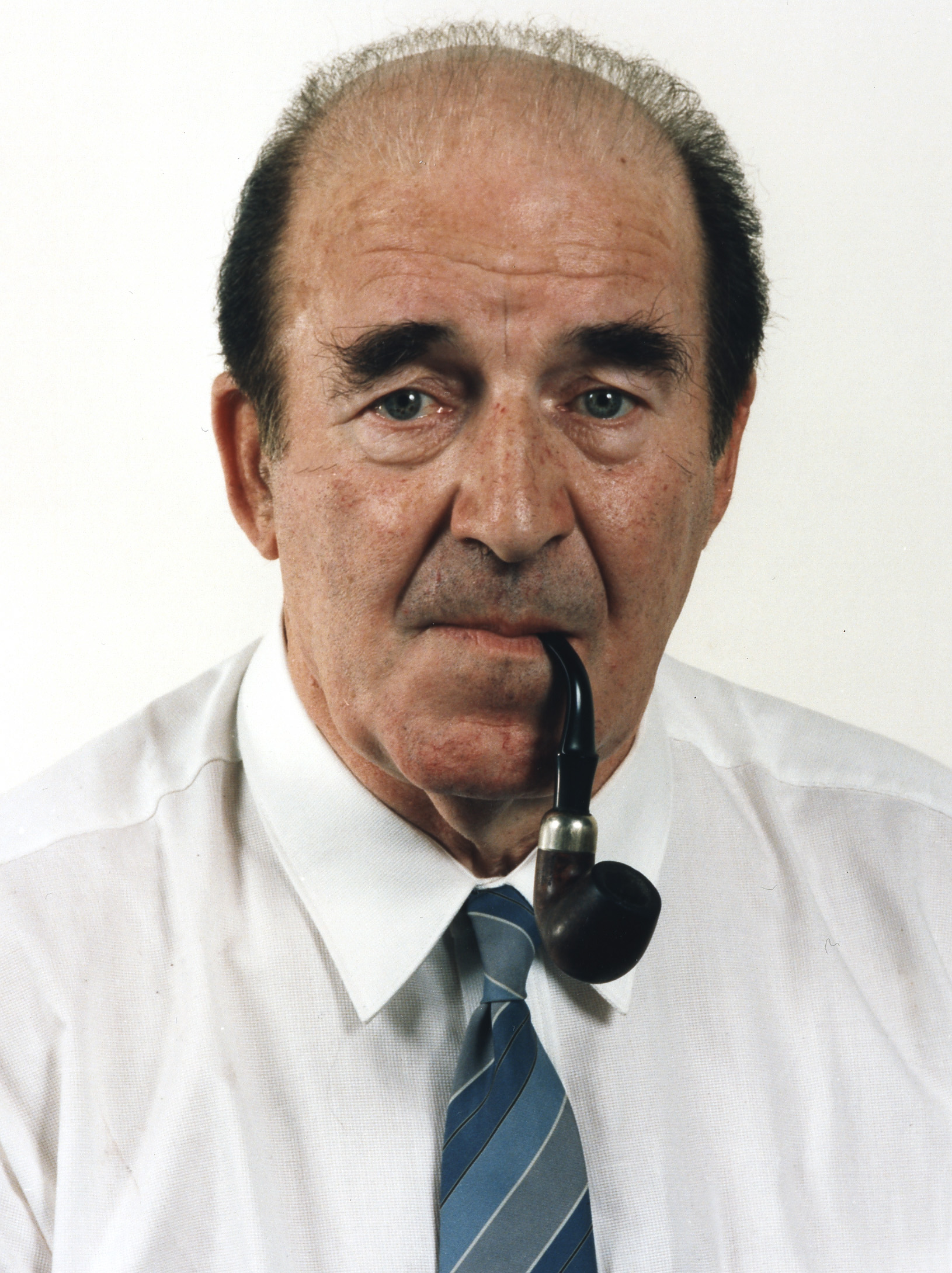
	First party	Second party	Third party
Leader	Charles Haughey	Garret FitzGerald	Dick Spring
Party	Fianna Fáil	Fine Gael	Labour
Alliance	EPD	EPP	SOC
Leader since	7 December 1979	1 July 1977	1 November 1982
Seats won	8 / 15	6 / 15	0 / 15
Seat change	▲3	▲2	▼4
Popular vote	438,946	361,034	93,656
Percentage	39.2%	32.2%	8.3%
Swing	▲4.5 pp	▼0.9 pp	▼6.2 pp
	Fourth party	Fifth party	Sixth party
Leader	Gerry Adams	Tomás Mac Giolla	Neil Blaney
Party	Sinn Féin	Workers' Party	Independent Fianna Fáil
Alliance			RBW
Leader since	13 November 1983	14 October 1962	1972
Seats won	0 / 15	0 / 15	0 / 15
Seat change	Steady	Steady	▼1
Popular vote	54,672	43,942	32,504
Percentage	4.9%	3.3%	2.9%
Swing			▼3.2 pp

The 1984 European Parliament election in Ireland was the Irish component of the 1984 European Parliament election. A constitutional amendment to allow the franchise at general elections to be extended to non-Irish citizens was approved by referendum on the same day.

== Constituencies ==
Ireland had 15 MEPs who were elected on the electoral system of proportional representation by means of the single transferable vote (PR-STV) in four constituencies based on the provinces of Ireland:

- Connacht–Ulster (3 seats);
- Dublin (4 seats);
- Leinster (3 seats);
- Munster (5 seats).

== Results ==
Party	Votes	%	+/–	Seats	+/–
Fianna Fáil	438,946	39.18	+4.5	8	+3
Fine Gael	361,034	32.22	-0.9	6	+2
Labour Party	93,656	8.36	-6.2	0	-4
Sinn Féin	54,672	4.88	New	0	New
Workers' Party	48,449	4.32	+1.0	0	0
Independent Fianna Fáil	32,504	2.90	-3.2	0	-1
Green Party	5,242	0.47	New	0	New
Independent	85,913	7.67	-0.6	1	0
Total	1,120,416	100.00	–	15	–
Valid votes	1,120,416	97.62			
Invalid/blank votes	27,329	2.38			
Total votes	1,147,745	100.00			
Registered voters/turnout	2,413,404	47.56			

=== MEPs elected ===
Constituency	Name	Party	EP group
Connacht–Ulster	Ray MacSharry	Fianna Fáil	EPD
Connacht–Ulster	Joe McCartin	Fine Gael	EPP
Connacht–Ulster	Seán Flanagan	Fianna Fáil	EPD
Dublin	Richie Ryan	Fine Gael	EPP
Dublin	Mary Banotti	Fine Gael	EPP
Dublin	Niall Andrews	Fianna Fáil	EPD
Dublin	Eileen Lemass	Fianna Fáil	EPD
Leinster	Mark Clinton	Fine Gael	EPP
Leinster	Jim Fitzsimons	Fianna Fáil	EPD
Leinster	Patrick Lalor	Fianna Fáil	EPD
Munster	T. J. Maher	Independent	ELDR
Munster	Tom O'Donnell	Fine Gael	EPP
Munster	Sylvester Barrett	Fianna Fáil	EPD
Munster	Tom Raftery	Fine Gael	EPP
Munster	Gene Fitzgerald	Fianna Fáil	EPD

=== Voting details ===
1979–2004 European Parliament Ireland constituencies

Constituency	Electorate	Turnout	Spoilt	Valid Poll	Quota	Seats	Candidates
Connacht–Ulster	471,577	241,244 (51.2%)	5,763 (2.4%)	235,481	58,871	3	11
Dublin	704,873	288,831 (40.9%)	6,153 (2.1%)	282,678	56,536	4	12
Leinster	545,878	268,491 (49.2%)	9,197 (3.4%)	259,294	64,824	3	9
Munster	691,076	349,179 (50.5%)	6,216 (1.8%)	342,963	57,161	5	9
Total	2,413,404	1,147,745 (47.6%)	27,329 (2.4%)	1,120,416	—	15	41
