= 1979 European Parliament election in Ireland =

- 7 June 1979

15 Irish seats to the European Parliament
- Turnout: 1,392,285 (63.6%)
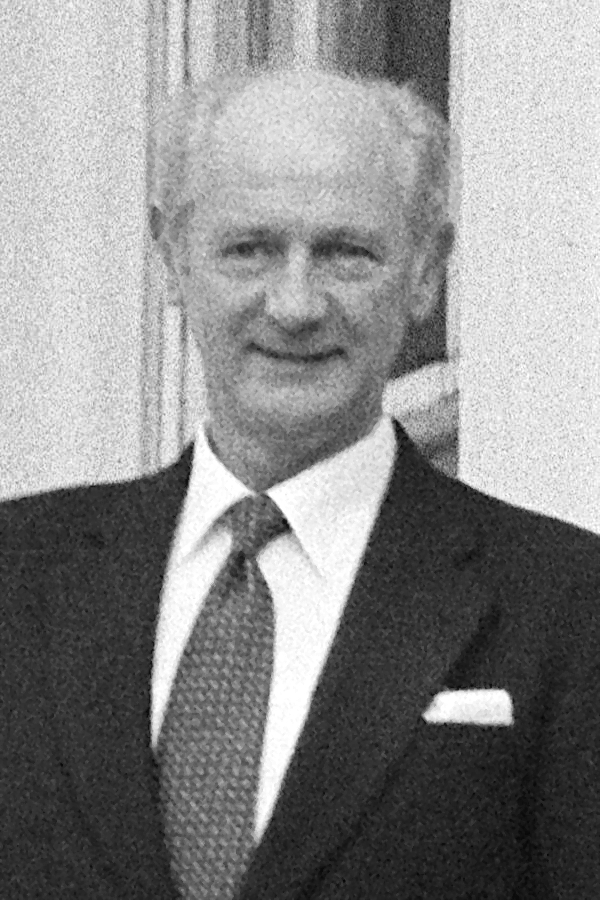

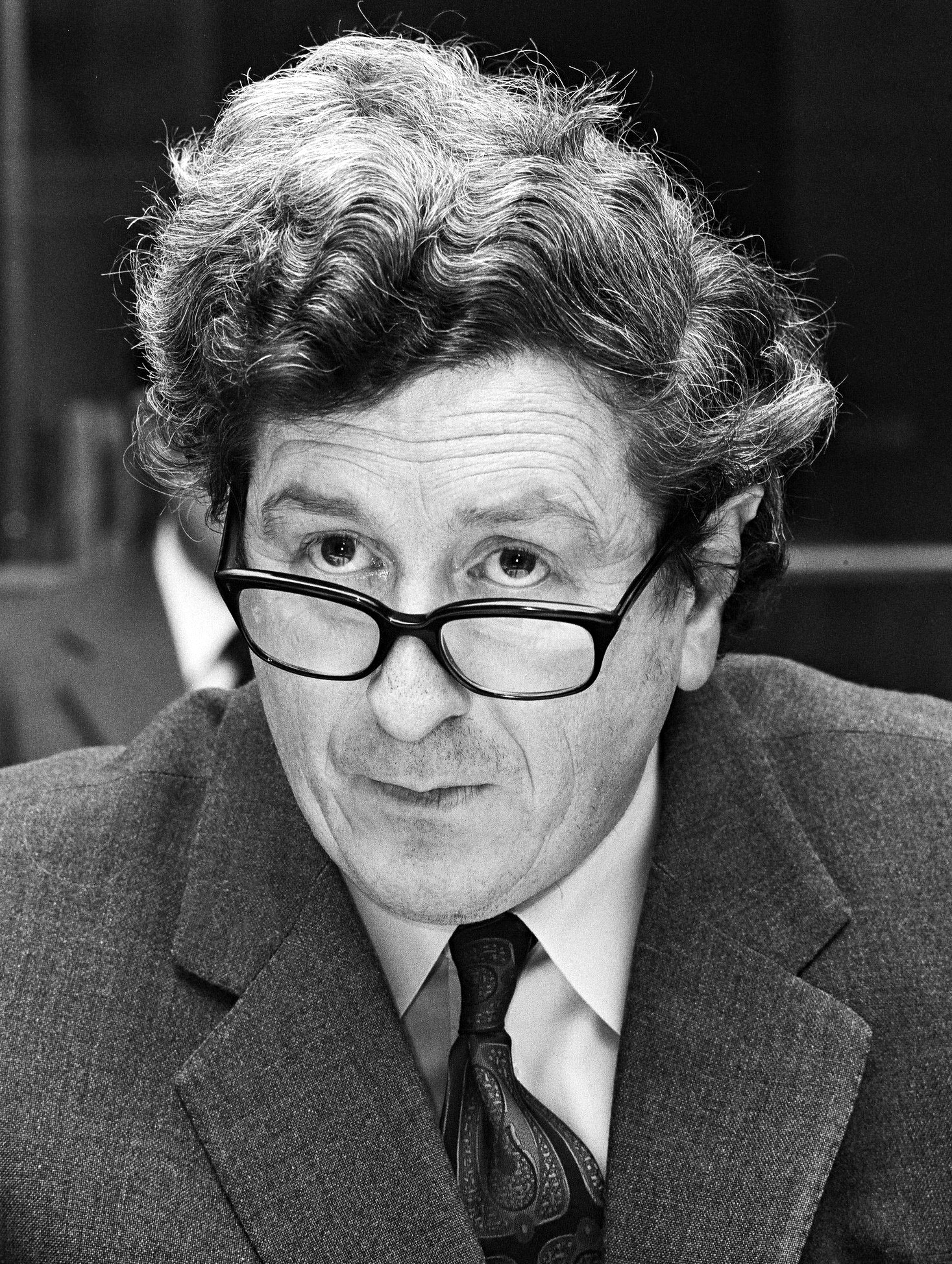

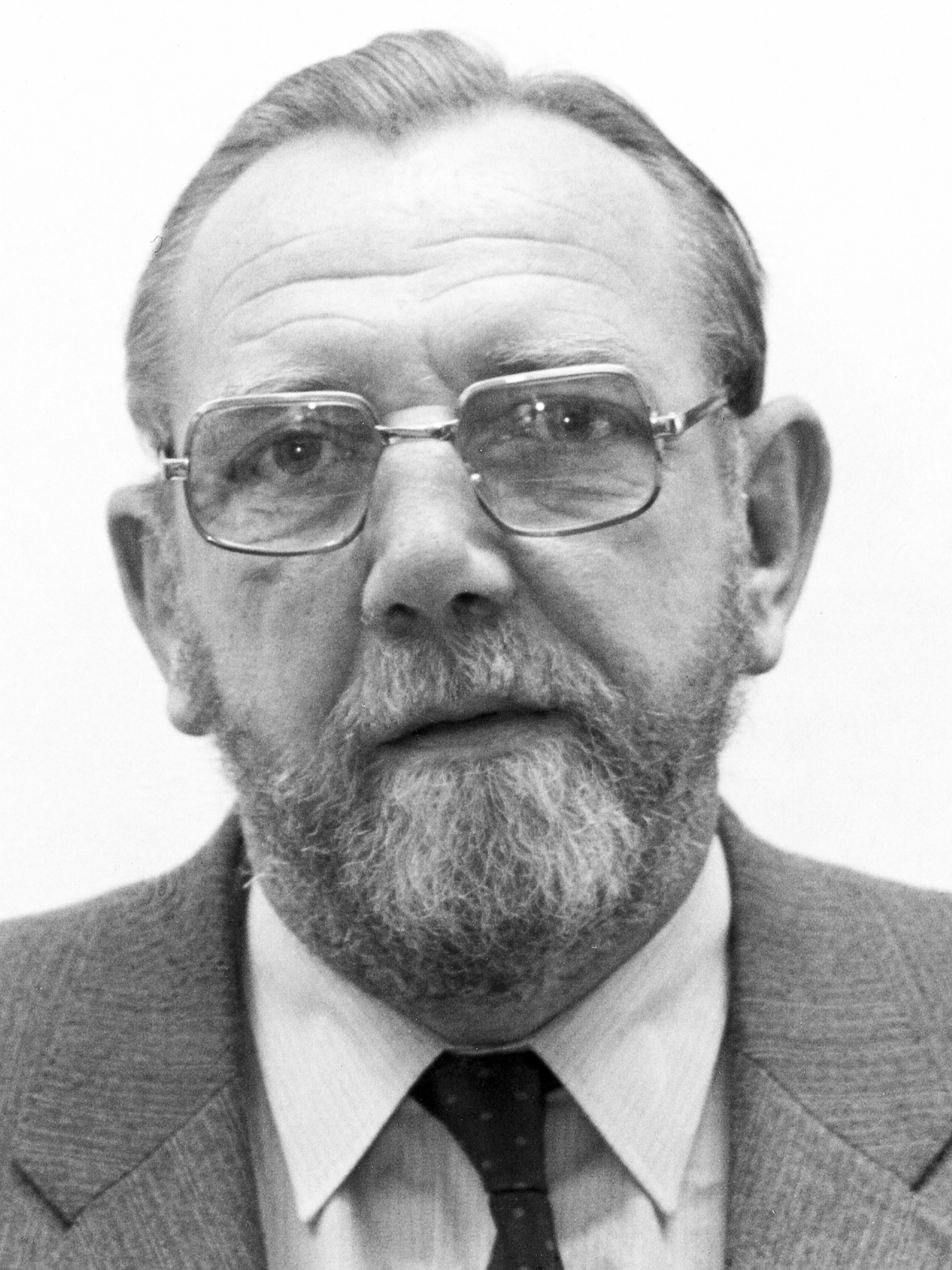

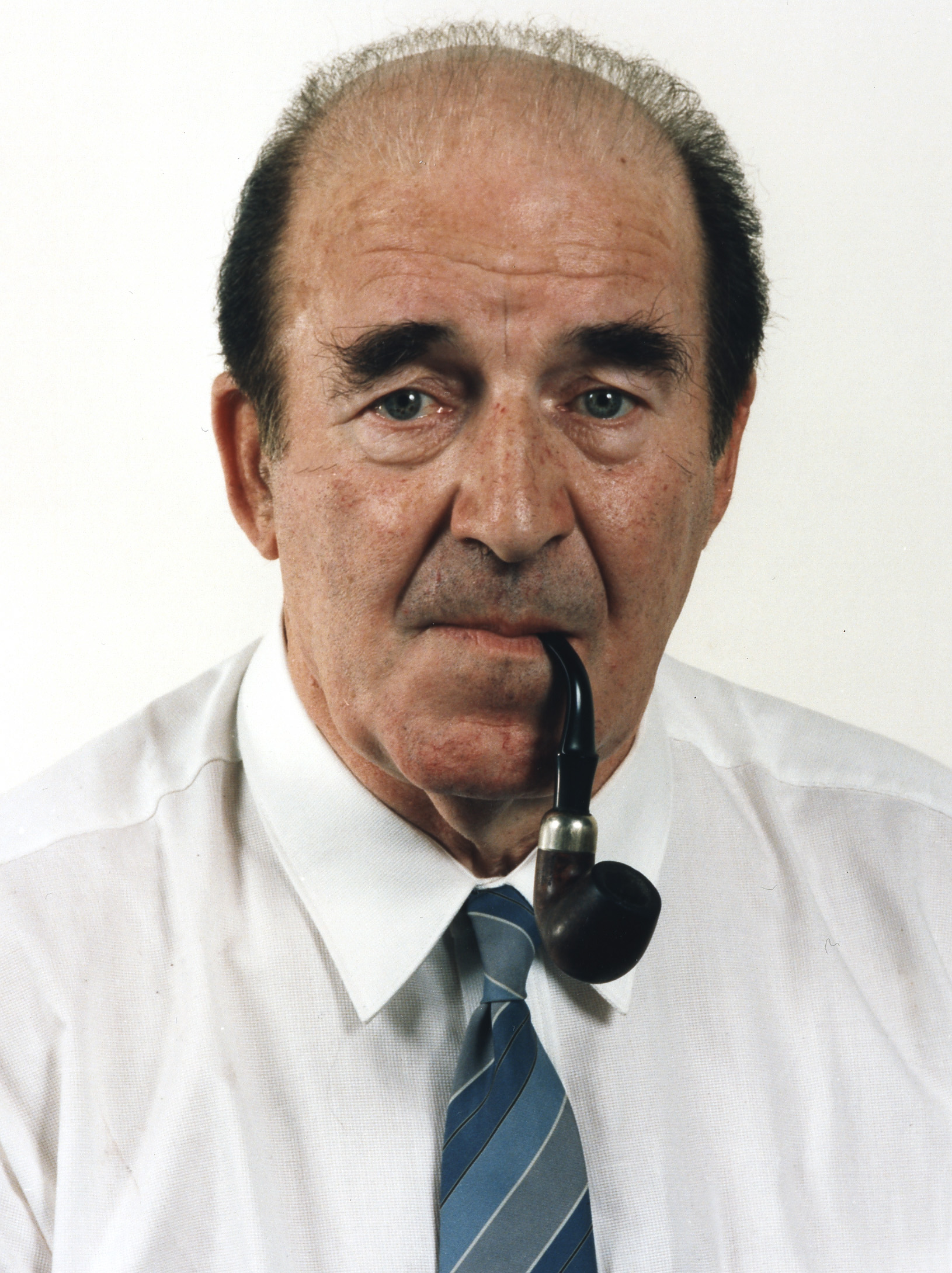

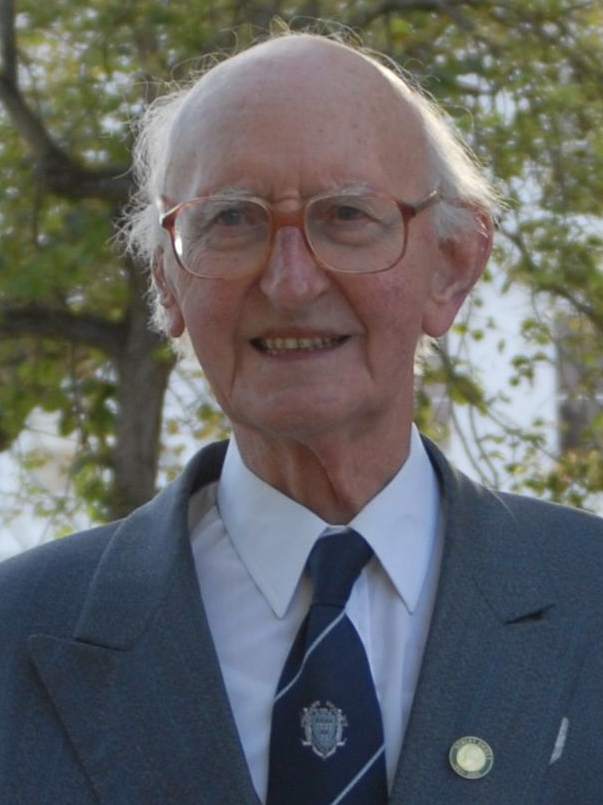
	First party	Second party	Third party
Leader	Jack Lynch	Garret FitzGerald	Frank Cluskey
Party	Fianna Fáil	Fine Gael	Labour
Alliance	EPD	EPP	SOC
Leader since	9 November 1966	1977	1977
Seats won	5 / 15	4 / 15	4 / 15
Popular vote	464,451	443,652	193,898
Percentage	34.7%	33.1%	14.5%
	Fourth party	Fifth party
Leader	Neil Blaney	Tomás Mac Giolla
Party	Independent Fianna Fáil	Sinn Féin The Workers' Party
Alliance	CDI
Leader since	1972	14 October 1962
Seats won	1 / 15	0 / 15
Popular vote	81,522	43,942
Percentage	6.1%	3.3%

The 1979 European Parliament election in Ireland was the Irish component of the 1979 European Parliament election. These were the first direct elections to the European Parliament, and the first election to be held simultaneously across the entire Island of Ireland since the 1921 Irish elections. The election was conducted under the single transferable vote.

== Constituencies ==
Ireland was entitled to 15 MEPs who were elected on the electoral system of proportional representation by means of the single transferable vote (PR-STV) in four constituencies based on the provinces of Ireland:

- Connacht–Ulster (3 seats);
- Dublin (4 seats);
- Leinster (3 seats);
- Munster (5 seats).

== Results ==
Party	Votes	%	Seats
Fianna Fáil	464,451	34.68	5
Fine Gael	443,652	33.13	4
Labour Party	193,898	14.48	4
Independent Fianna Fáil	81,522	6.09	1
Sinn Féin The Workers' Party	43,942	3.28	0
Independent	111,607	8.33	1
Total	1,339,072	100.00	15
Valid votes	1,339,072	96.18	
Invalid/blank votes	53,213	3.82	
Total votes	1,392,285	100.00	
Registered voters/turnout	2,188,798	63.61	

=== MEPs elected ===
Constituency	Name	Party	EP group
Connacht–Ulster	Neil Blaney	Independent Fianna Fáil	CDI
Connacht–Ulster	Joe McCartin	Fine Gael	EPP
Connacht–Ulster	Seán Flanagan	Fianna Fáil	EPD
Dublin	Richie Ryan	Fine Gael	EPP
Dublin	John O'Connell	Labour	SOC
Dublin	Síle de Valera	Fianna Fáil	EPD
Dublin	Michael O'Leary	Labour	SOC
Leinster	Mark Clinton	Fine Gael	EPP
Leinster	Patrick Lalor	Fianna Fáil	EPD
Leinster	Liam Kavanagh	Labour	SOC
Munster	T.J. Maher	Independent	ELDR
Munster	Eileen Desmond	Labour	SOC
Munster	Tom O'Donnell	Fine Gael	EPP
Munster	Jerry Cronin	Fianna Fáil	EPD
Munster	Noel Davern	Fianna Fáil	EPD

=== Voting details ===
1979–2004 European Parliament Ireland constituencies

Constituency	Electorate	Turnout	Spoilt	Valid Poll	Quota	Seats	Candidates
Connacht–Ulster	442,471	320,713 (72.5%)	14,547 (4.5%)	306,166	76,542	3	11
Dublin	618,454	304,068 (49.2%)	8,653 (2.8%)	295,415	59,084	4	13
Leinster	486,248	322,312 (66.30%)	15,416 (4.80%)	306,896	61,380	3	9
Munster	641,625	445,192 (69.40%)	14,597 (3.3%)	430,595	71,766	5	13
Total	2,188,798	1,392,285 (63.6%)	53,213 (3.8%)	1,339,072	—	15	46

== Aftermath ==
Provisional Sinn Féin did not contest the election. However, the relative success of Bernadette McAliskey in Northern Ireland helped prompt Sinn Féin to stand in subsequent European elections.
