= European Parliament constituencies in the Republic of Ireland =

Ireland has 14 seats in the European Parliament. Elections are held on the electoral system of proportional representation by means of the single transferable vote (PR-STV).

At the 2024 European Parliament election for the Tenth European Parliament, MEPs were elected from the following constituencies:

Constituency	Area	Seats
Dublin	The counties of: Dún Laoghaire-Rathdown, Fingal and South Dublin; and the city of Dublin.	4
Midlands–North-West	The counties of: Cavan, Donegal, Galway, Kildare, Laois, Leitrim, Longford, Louth, Mayo, Meath, Monaghan, Offaly, Roscommon, Sligo and Westmeath; and the city of Galway.	5
South	The counties of: Carlow, Clare, Cork, Kerry, Kilkenny, Tipperary, Wexford and Wicklow; the cities and counties of Limerick and Waterford; and the city of Cork.	5

In June 2023, the European Parliament adopted a resolution to add 11 MEPs. This was adopted by the European Council in September 2023. Ireland gained one MEP under this arrangement, increasing from 13 to 14.

The Electoral Commission sought submissions on a review of European Parliament Constituencies. In a report in November 2023, it recommended that the additional seat be given to the constituency of Midlands–North-West, with the transfer of County Laois and County Offaly from South. This change was implemented by the Electoral (Amendment) Act 2023.

== Changes ==
This lists the number of MEPs elected at each European Parliament election by constituency.

Election	Constituencies				Total seats
(1973)	(MEPs nominated by Oireachtas)				10
	Dublin	Leinster	Munster	Connacht–Ulster	
1979	4	3	5	3	15
1984	4	3	5	3	15
1989	4	3	5	3	15
1994	4	4	4	3	15
1999	4	4	4	3	15
	Dublin	East	South	North-West	
2004	4	3	3 (Note: County Clare moved from Munster/South to Connacht–Ulster/North–West.)	3	13
2009	3	3 (Note: Counties Longford and Westmeath moved from East to North–West.)	3	3	12
	Dublin	South		Midlands–North-West	
2014	3	4 (Note: Counties Carlow, Kilkenny, Wexford and Wicklow moved from East to South.) (Note: County Clare moved from North-West/Midlands–North-West to South.)		4 (Note: Counties of Kildare, Laois, Louth, Meath, Offaly and Westmeath moved from East to North-West/Midlands–North-West.)	11
2019	4 (Note: The last candidate elected in 2019 in Dublin and in South did not take their seat until after the United Kingdom had left the EU on 31 January 2020.)	5 (Note: Counties Laois and Offaly moved from Midlands–North-West to South.)		4	13
2024	4	5 (Note: Counties Laois and Offaly to move from South to Midlands–North-West.)		5	14

== European Parliament constituencies since 1979 ==
1979–2004

2004–2009

2009–2014

2014–2019

2019–2024

2024–present

== See also ==
- Northern Ireland (European Parliament constituency)
