= Connacht–Ulster =

Former European Parliament constituency

- European Parliament constituency
- Shown within Ireland
- Member state: Ireland
- Created: 1979
- Dissolved: 2004
- MEPs: 3

Connacht–Ulster was a constituency of the European Parliament in Ireland between 1979 and 2004. Throughout its history, it elected three Members of the European Parliament (MEPs) using the single transferable vote (STV) system.

== History and boundaries ==
The constituency was created in 1979 for the first direct elections to the European Parliament. It comprised the counties of Galway, Leitrim, Mayo, Roscommon and Sligo from the historic province of Connacht together with the Ulster counties of Cavan, Donegal, and Monaghan. It was abolished under the European Parliament Elections (Amendment) Act 2004 and succeeded by the new North-West constituency.

== MEPs ==
Members of the European Parliament (MEPs) for Connacht–Ulster 1979–2004
Key to parties: FF = Fianna Fáil; FG = Fine Gael; IFF = Independent Fianna Fáil; Ind = Independent
| Parl. | Election | Member (Party) | Member (Party) | Member (Party) |
| 1st | 1979 | Neil Blaney (IFF) | Seán Flanagan (FF) | Joe McCartin (FG) |
| 2nd | 1984 | Ray MacSharry (Note: Ray MacSharry resigned on 10 March 1987 and was substituted by Mark Killilea (FF / EDA) on 24 March 1987.) (FF) | Seán Flanagan (FF) | Joe McCartin (FG) |
| 2nd | 1987 | Mark Killilea (FF) | Seán Flanagan (FF) | Joe McCartin (FG) |
| 3rd | 1989 | Mark Killilea (FF) | Neil Blaney (IFF) | Joe McCartin (FG) |
| 4th | 1994 | Mark Killilea (FF) | Pat "the Cope" Gallagher (Note: Pat "the Cope" Gallagher was substituted by Seán Ó Neachtain (FF / UEN) on 2 July 2002, following the 2002 general election.) (FF) | Joe McCartin (FG) |
| 5th | 1999 | Dana Rosemary Scallon (Ind) | Pat "the Cope" Gallagher (FF) | Joe McCartin (FG) |
| 5th | 2002 | Dana Rosemary Scallon (Ind) | Seán Ó Neachtain (FF) | Joe McCartin (FG) |
| 6th | 2004 | Constituency abolished. See North-West. | | |

Note: The columns in this table are used only for presentational purposes, and no significance should be attached to the order of columns. For details of the order in which seats were won at each election, see the detailed results of that election.

== Elections ==
*: Outgoing MEP elected at the previous election.
†: Outgoing MEP co-opted subsequent to the previous election.

=== 1999 election ===
1999 European Parliament election: Connacht–Ulster
| Party | Candidate | FPv% | Count | | | | | |
| Party | Candidate | FPv% | 1 | 2 | 3 | 4 | 5 | 6 |
|---|---|---|---|---|---|---|---|---|
| Fianna Fáil | Pat "the Cope" Gallagher | 20.6 | 66,055 | 66,381 | 66,902 | 72,673 | 98,258 | |
| Fine Gael | Joe McCartin | 19.9 | 63,632 | 63,811 | 64,506 | 68,388 | 72,764 | 75,275 |
| Independent | Dana Rosemary Scallon | 16.0 | 51,086 | 51,366 | 52,802 | 59,444 | 67,887 | 72,855 |
| Fianna Fáil | Noel Treacy | 15.0 | 47,933 | 48,060 | 48,470 | 51,544 | | |
| Independent | Marian Harkin | 14.8 | 47,372 | 47,712 | 48,632 | 56,141 | 60,316 | 64,152 |
| Sinn Féin | Seán MacManus | 6.4 | 20,457 | 20,571 | 20,801 | | | |
| Labour | Gerard Gibbons | 3.3 | 10,522 | 10,827 | 10,972 | | | |
| Independent | Liam Sharkey | 1.7 | 5,334 | 5,404 | | | | |
| Independent | Luke 'Ming' Flanagan | 1.6 | 5,000 | 5,539 | 5,650 | | | |
| Natural Law | Paul Campbell | 0.6 | 1,920 | | | | | |
| Independent | Paul Raymond | 0.3 | 840 | | | | | |
Electorate: 541,552 Valid: 320,151 Spoilt: 12,085 (3.6%) Quota: 80,038 Turnout: 332,236 (61.4%)

Mark Killilea retired and his seat was gained by Independent Dana Rosemary Scallon.

=== 1994 election ===
1994 European Parliament election: Connacht–Ulster
| Party | Candidate | FPv% | Count | | | | |
| Party | Candidate | FPv% | 1 | 2 | 3 | 4 | 5 |
|---|---|---|---|---|---|---|---|
| Fianna Fáil | Pat "the Cope" Gallagher | 22.9 | 53,171 | 54,122 | 57,657 | 59,372 | |
| Fianna Fáil | Mark Killilea | 19.6 | 45,638 | 46,445 | 47,500 | 53,030 | 59,773 |
| Fine Gael | Joe McCartin | 16.4 | 38,039 | 38,861 | 39,461 | 43,896 | 49,371 |
| Fine Gael | Jim Higgins | 13.3 | 30,947 | 32,100 | 32,768 | 37,135 | 42,153 |
| Progressive Democrats | Bobby Molloy | 9.1 | 21,219 | 22,784 | 23,538 | | |
| Labour | Ann Gallagher | 8.5 | 19,826 | 22,195 | 25,303 | 27,875 | |
| Sinn Féin | Pat Doherty | 6.0 | 13,939 | 14,665 | | | |
| Green | Richard Douthwaite | 3.7 | 8,628 | | | | |
| Natural Law | Mary Louise Lacey | 0.5 | 1,223 | | | | |
Electorate: 496,352 Valid: 232,630 Spoilt: 4,971 (2.1%) Quota: 58,158 Turnout: 237,601 (47.9%)

Pat "the Cope" Gallagher of Fianna Fáil gained the seat vacated by Neil Blaney.

=== 1989 election ===
1989 European Parliament election: Connacht–Ulster
| Party | Candidate | FPv% | Count | | | | | | | | |
| Party | Candidate | FPv% | 1 | 2 | 3 | 4 | 5 | 6 | 7 | 8 | 9 |
|---|---|---|---|---|---|---|---|---|---|---|---|
| Fianna Fáil | Mark Killilea | 17.2 | 53,842 | 53,950 | 54,122 | 54,395 | 54,668 | 55,095 | 57,686 | 58,795 | 67,246 |
| Independent Fianna Fáil | Neil Blaney | 16.9 | 52,852 | 53,075 | 53,922 | 54,425 | 55,981 | 56,940 | 59,954 | 63,193 | 69,857 |
| Fianna Fáil | Seán Doherty | 15.5 | 48,288 | 48,367 | 48,569 | 48,725 | 49,186 | 49,474 | 50,694 | 51,562 | 53,641 |
| Fine Gael | Joe McCartin | 14.9 | 46,523 | 46,579 | 46,694 | 47,045 | 47,328 | 47,589 | 52,737 | 71,091 | 84,697 |
| Progressive Democrats | Bobby Molloy | 13.0 | 40,476 | 40,564 | 40,754 | 41,613 | 41,804 | 43,254 | 45,621 | 48,227 | |
| Fine Gael | Paddy Harte | 9.8 | 30,745 | 30,798 | 31,225 | 31,559 | 31,715 | 32,137 | 34,663 | | |
| Fine Gael | Angela Lupton | 3.3 | 10,165 | 10,212 | 10,254 | 10,553 | 10,615 | 11,154 | | | |
| Sinn Féin | Pat Doherty | 2.5 | 7,716 | 8,119 | 8,237 | 8,315 | 10,668 | 11,094 | | | |
| Sinn Féin | Caoimhghín Ó Caoláin | 2.0 | 6,173 | 6,441 | 6,553 | 6,656 | | | | | |
| Labour | Ivan McPhillips | 1.6 | 4,969 | 5,012 | 5,306 | | | | | | |
| Workers' Party | Jimmy Brick | 1.5 | 4,759 | 4,840 | 5,333 | 6,710 | 6,841 | | | | |
| Workers' Party | Seamus Rodgers | 1.3 | 4,097 | 4,112 | | | | | | | |
| Sinn Féin | Dermot Guy | 0.5 | 1,697 | | | | | | | | |
Electorate: 464,661 Valid: 312,302 Spoilt: 10,362 (3.2%) Quota: 78,076 Turnout: 322,664 (69.4%)

Neil Blaney regained his seat at the expense of Fianna Fáil.

=== 1984 election ===
1984 European Parliament election: Connacht–Ulster
| Party | Candidate | FPv% | Count | | | | | | | | |
| Party | Candidate | FPv% | 1 | 2 | 3 | 4 | 5 | 6 | 7 | 8 | 9 |
|---|---|---|---|---|---|---|---|---|---|---|---|
| Fianna Fáil | Ray MacSharry | 24.1 | 56,803 | 56,955 | 57,252 | 57,718 | 57,896 | 58,740 | 59,448 | | |
| Fine Gael | Joe McCartin | 21.7 | 51,164 | 51,293 | 51,545 | 51,752 | 54,991 | 57,247 | 57,761 | 76,674 | |
| Fianna Fáil | Seán Flanagan | 17.3 | 40,760 | 41,017 | 41,424 | 41,615 | 41,788 | 42,657 | 43,021 | 43,915 | 46,010 |
| Independent Fianna Fáil | Neil Blaney | 13.8 | 32,504 | 32,875 | 33,622 | 35,379 | 35,610 | 37,340 | 40,415 | 42,324 | 44,430 |
| Fine Gael | Joseph Murrin | 8.5 | 20,107 | 20,204 | 20,415 | 20,568 | 23,190 | 25,154 | 25,459 | | |
| Labour | Michael D. Higgins | 3.5 | 8,337 | 9,205 | 9,401 | 9,587 | 9,988 | | | | |
| Fine Gael | Pól Ó Foighil | 3.0 | 7,144 | 7,214 | 7,282 | 7,323 | | | | | |
| Sinn Féin | Caoimhghín Ó Caoláin | 2.6 | 6,103 | 6,158 | 7,167 | 10,043 | 10,159 | 10,417 | | | |
| Sinn Féin | Eddie Fullerton | 2.5 | 5,771 | 5,896 | 6,706 | | | | | | |
| Sinn Féin | Mary McGing | 1.8 | 4,176 | 4,294 | | | | | | | |
| Workers' Party | Jimmy Brick | 1.1 | 2,612 | | | | | | | | |
Electorate: 471,577 Valid: 235,481 Spoilt: 5,763 (2.4%) Quota: 58,871 Turnout: 241,244 (51.2%)

Neil Blaney lost his seat to Ray MacSharry of Fianna Fáil.

=== 1979 election ===
1979 European Parliament election
| Party | Candidate | FPv% | Count | | | | | | |
| Party | Candidate | FPv% | 1 | 2 | 3 | 4 | 5 | 6 | 7 |
|---|---|---|---|---|---|---|---|---|---|
| Independent Fianna Fáil | Neil Blaney | 26.6 | 81,522 | | | | | | |
| Fine Gael | Joe McCartin | 15.5 | 47,519 | 47,989 | 49,697 | 50,474 | 51,696 | 65,471 | 66,901 |
| Fianna Fáil | Seán Flanagan | 12.5 | 38,233 | 38,653 | 39,478 | 40,732 | 52,409 | 54,826 | 82,209 |
| Fine Gael | Patrick Cooney | 10.9 | 33,360 | 34,142 | 36,596 | 37,281 | 38,006 | 50,025 | 51,267 |
| Fine Gael | Myles Staunton | 10.6 | 32,485 | 32,773 | 35,343 | 35,746 | 36,189 | | |
| Fianna Fáil | Jim Doolan | 9.1 | 27,739 | 28,263 | 29,781 | 30,606 | 37,781 | 38,576 | |
| Fianna Fáil | Sean McEniff | 8.4 | 25,774 | 26,267 | 26,782 | 27,818 | | | |
| Labour | Michael D. Higgins | 4.3 | 13,062 | 14,013 | | | | | |
| Sinn Féin The Workers' Party | Tony Coffey | 1.1 | 3,329 | | | | | | |
| Sinn Féin The Workers' Party | Séamus Rodgers | 0.9 | 2,696 | | | | | | |
| Community Democrats | Christopher Morris | 0.2 | 447 | | | | | | |
Electorate: 442,471 Valid: 306,166 Spoilt: 14,547 (4.5%) Quota: 76,542 Turnout: 320,713 (72.5%)

== See also ==
- European Parliament constituencies in the Republic of Ireland
