= Patrick Ryan (Irish priest) =

Irish republican (1930–2025)

Patrick Ryan (26 June 1930 – 15 June 2025) was an Irish Catholic priest and Provisional IRA arms supplier. He was laicised by the Pallottine Order in 1973.

In 1988, Ryan was accused of involvement in Provisional IRA activity, and was the subject of two unsuccessful extradition requests. Ryan denied the accusation in an interview with The Tipperary Star, saying that he had raised money both inside and outside Europe for victims on the nationalist side in the Troubles of Northern Ireland, but insisted that he had "never bought explosives for the IRA or anybody else", and had never been requested by the paramilitary group to do so. In an interview with the BBC broadcast in 2019, Ryan admitted that he was "one hundred per cent" involved in IRA bomb-making.

In IRA circles he was known as "The Padre"; in the British press he was called "the Devil's Disciple" and the "Terror Priest".

== Early life ==
Ryan was born on 26 June 1930, in Rossmore, County Tipperary, one of six children in a farming family. His mother was a strong supporter of Irish nationalism, which influenced Ryan. He attended the Pallotine College in Thurles, being ordained in 1954. He worked on the missions in the diocese of Mbulu in Tanzania, and also in East London. While in Africa, he shot elephants for sport.

== IRA activity ==
"The only regret I have was that I wasn't more effective, that the bombs made with the components I supplied didn't kill more."
– Patrick Ryan in an interview with his biographer, Jennifer O'Leary.

By 1968, Ryan was back in Ireland during the start of The Troubles. His role in the Pallottine order at the time was to receive donations throughout Ireland. He instead began to pass these donations to the IRA, abandoning the order. His role as a priest was considered excellent cover for his actions. After the 1969 Libyan coup, he was chosen to visit leader Muammar Gaddafi, becoming the conduit between the regime and the IRA, which resulted in Gaddafi helping to fund and supply weapons to the organization.

In 1975, Ryan was in Switzerland, where he held bank accounts, when he noticed a small memo timer. This was a device that was intended to remind the user of things such as parking timer limits. After purchasing the device, he was able to re-engineer it into a more reliable detonation timer. These devices became a hallmark of IRA attacks, with fragments found at the 1979 Warrenpoint ambush that killed 18 British soldiers, as well as the 1984 Brighton hotel bombing that narrowly avoided killing British Prime Minister Margaret Thatcher.

On 1 May 1988, three off-duty British servicemen were killed in the Netherlands. On 30 June 1988, acting on a tip-off, Belgian police went to the home of an IRA sympathiser and arrested Ryan, who was believed to be acting as quartermaster of the IRA active service unit in Belgium. Upon his arrest, the police seized a quantity of bomb-making equipment and manuals, and a large sum of foreign currency. The British authorities provided substantial evidence in support of a request for Ryan's extradition from Belgium to face charges in Britain. Legal argument between the two countries ensued and, following a hunger strike in protest against his possible extradition to Britain, Ryan was, after a court ruling, instead deported to the Republic of Ireland.

On 30 November 1988, the European Court of Human Rights ruled that Britain was in breach of European law for permitting the detention for up to a week of people suspected of connections with terrorist groups. Prime Minister Margaret Thatcher reacted angrily to the court ruling and to Britain's failure to secure the extradition of Patrick Ryan, who was wanted on charges of helping the outlawed IRA.

Thatcher told the House of Commons: "We shall consider the judgment carefully, and also the human rights of the victims and potential victims of terrorism."

== Extradition demand ==
Upon his transfer to Ireland, Britain formally demanded Ryan's extradition.

On 29 November 1988, Conservative MP Michael Mates called at PMQs for his immediate extradition. Thatcher responded:

"The failure to secure Ryan's arrest is a matter of very grave concern to the Government. It is no use governments [of Belgium and Ireland] adopting great declarations and commitments about fighting terrorism if they then lack the resolve to put them into practice."

The next day in parliament, Labour MP Tony Benn raised with the Speaker the following point of order:

"It is clearly a misuse of privilege to use the protection of the House of Commons to make such an allegation. Father Ryan is wanted on a serious charge. It could hardly be more serious. It is in accordance with the practice of British courts that anyone charged is presumed innocent until convicted. Therefore, when a senior Member of the House says, and it is confirmed by the Prime Minister, that that person is a terrorist, it is impossible from that moment on for that man to have a fair trial. The BBC broadcast those remarks and every newspaper has highlighted them. Yesterday, the House of Commons became a lynch mob, headed by the Prime Minister, whose remarks are bound to prejudice any jury or judge if Father Ryan is brought to this country."

Michael Mates MP was the next to speak:

"Further to that point of order, Mr Speaker, I am grateful to the right hon. Member for Chesterfield (Mr Benn) for the courtesy of telling me that he was going to raise this matter. I used the phrase yesterday solely in the context of my outrage at the fact that that person was not being brought here to face trial. It was not intended to be an intimation of guilt. Strictly, I should have said, 'Ryan is the man the security forces most want in connection with serious offences.' I am happy to make that plain."

== Extradition denial ==
On 1 December 1988, the Attorney General, Sir Patrick Mayhew, asserted that the extradition paperwork sent to Ireland was in order and the government's claim to have Ryan extradited should be acceded to. However, Ryan said that he would rather die than face a British tribunal as he believed Irish people could never receive justice through the British legal system.

On 3 December 1988, Thatcher met with Irish Taoiseach Charles Haughey at a European Council summit in Rhodes, where she expressed strong frustration over the Irish government's refusal to extradite Ryan. Thatcher described Ryan as "a very dangerous man", and accused him of facilitating large financial transfers from Libya to the Provisional IRA. Haughey defended Ireland's legal procedures, stating that a warrant could not be issued before Ryan entered the country, and he criticized the contentious tone of UK-Irish discussions. He described the case as involving a "mad priest careering around Europe" and proposed returning to the Criminal Law (Jurisdiction) Act as an alternative to extradition.

The controversy was heightened by the publication of a letter in The Guardian of 7 December 1988 from a British diplomat accusing Thatcher of "double standards on terrorism" for insisting on Ryan's extradition while failing to pursue the extradition of the Coventry Four from South Africa four years earlier.

The following week, amid exchanges in the House of Commons, Opposition leader Neil Kinnock, said that Thatcher "blew" the possibility of Ryan's extradition by her "performance." On 13 December 1988, the Irish Taoiseach, Charles Haughey, announced in Dáil Éireann that the serious charges levelled against Ryan should be investigated by a court in Ireland and, because of prejudicial remarks made in the House of Commons, Ryan could not expect to receive a fair trial in Britain.

In October 1989, the Director of Public Prosecutions in Ireland announced that he had decided not to initiate proceedings against Patrick Ryan.

== 1989 European election ==
Ryan was the first (former) priest to contest an election in the Republic of Ireland, when he contested the 1989 European Parliament election as an independent with Sinn Féin support. In the five-seat Munster constituency, he came eighth in the first-preference vote with 6.3%.

== Criminal trial ==
In 1993, Ryan was tried in the Special Criminal Court, on charges of receiving stolen goods; he was found not guilty.

== BBC Spotlight interview ==
In a 2019 interview with the BBC, Ryan was asked if he was involved in any of the incidents of which Thatcher accused him, to which he responded "I would say most of them. One way or another, yes I had a hand in most them - yes, she was right". He stated that his only regret about his contribution to the Brighton hotel bombing, which killed five people, was that "I wasn't even more effective... I would like to have been much more effective, but we didn't do too badly".

== Death ==
Ryan died in Dublin on 15 June 2025, at the age of 94.
