= Munster (European Parliament constituency) =

Former European Parliament constituency

- European Parliament constituency
- Shown within Ireland
- Member state: Ireland
- Created: 1979
- Dissolved: 2004
- MEPs: 5 (1979–1994); 4 (1994–2004)

Munster was a European Parliament constituency in Ireland between 1979 and 2004. It elected five Members of the European Parliament (MEPs) in the elections of 1979, 1984 and 1989 and four MEPs in the 1994 and 1999 elections on the electoral system of proportional representation by means of the single transferable vote (PR-STV).

== History and boundaries ==
The constituency was created in 1979 for the first direct elections to the European Parliament. It comprised County Clare, County Cork, County Kerry, County Limerick, County Tipperary and County Waterford from the historic province of Munster including the cities of Cork, Limerick and Waterford. It was abolished under the European Parliament Elections (Amendment) Act 2004 and succeeded by the new South constituency.

== MEPs ==
Members of the European Parliament (MEPs) for Munster 1979–2004
Key to parties: FF = Fianna Fáil; FG = Fine Gael; Ind. = Independent; Lab = Labour; PDs = Progressive Democrats
| Parl. | Election | Member (Party) | Member (Party) | Member (Party) | Member (Party) | Member (Party) |
| 1st | 1979 | T. J. Maher (Ind.) | Tom O'Donnell (FG) | Eileen Desmond (Lab) | Jerry Cronin (Note: Jerry Cronin resigned on 23 May 1984 and his seat was vacant at dissolution.) (FF) | Noel Davern (FF) |
| 1st | 1981 (Note: Eileen Desmond resigned on 7 July 1981 on her appointment as Minister for Health and Minister for Social Welfare and was substituted by Seán Treacy (LAB / PES) on 9 July 1981.) | T. J. Maher (Ind.) | Tom O'Donnell (FG) | Seán Treacy (Lab) | Jerry Cronin (FF) | Noel Davern (FF) |
| 2nd | 1984 | T. J. Maher (Ind.) | Tom O'Donnell (FG) | Tom Raftery (FG) | Sylvester Barrett (FF) | Gene Fitzgerald (FF) |
| 3rd | 1989 | T. J. Maher (Ind.) | John Cushnahan (FG) | Pat Cox (Note: Cox left the PDs on 13 May 1994.) (PDs) | Paddy Lane (FF) | Gene Fitzgerald (FF) |
| 4th | 1994 | Brian Crowley (FF) | John Cushnahan (FG) | Pat Cox (Ind.) | Gerry Collins (FF) | 4 seats from 1994 |
| 5th | 1999 | Brian Crowley (FF) | John Cushnahan (FG) | Pat Cox (Ind.) | Gerry Collins (FF) | 4 seats from 1994 |
| 6th | 2004 | Constituency abolished. See South. | | | | |

Note: The columns in this table are used only for presentational purposes, and no significance should be attached to the order of columns. For details of the order in which seats were won at each election, see the detailed results of that election.

== Elections ==
*: Outgoing MEP elected at the previous election.

=== 1999 election ===
1999 European Parliament election: Munster (4 seats)
| Party | Candidate | FPv% | Count | | | | | |
| Party | Candidate | FPv% | 1 | 2 | 3 | 4 | 5 | 6 |
|---|---|---|---|---|---|---|---|---|
| Fianna Fáil | Brian Crowley | 34.4 | 154,195 | | | | | |
| Fianna Fáil | Gerry Collins | 18.5 | 83,106 | 117,783 | | | | |
| Independent | Pat Cox | 14.3 | 63,954 | 76,203 | 85,257 | 88,357 | 95,004 | |
| Fine Gael | John Cushnahan | 10.3 | 46,100 | 49,009 | 50,496 | 51,483 | 53,497 | 78,232 |
| Fine Gael | Jim Corr | 7.0 | 31,363 | 35,026 | 37,556 | 38,693 | 40,669 | |
| Sinn Féin | Martin Ferris | 6.5 | 29,060 | 31,783 | 34,435 | 36,534 | | |
| Labour | Paula Desmond | 6.3 | 28,270 | 34,002 | 36,884 | 40,746 | 46,887 | 52,831 |
| Green | Ben Nutty | 2.3 | 10,257 | 12,330 | 13,643 | | | |
| Natural Law | Stewart Luck | 0.3 | 1,267 | 1,602 | 1,897 | | | |
| Independent | Denis Riordan | 0.2 | 1,007 | 1,125 | 1,268 | | | |
Electorate: 823,008 Valid: 448,579 Spoilt: 13,724 (2.9%) Quota: 89,716 Turnout: 462,303 (56.2%)

=== 1994 election ===
1994 European Parliament election: Munster (4 seats)
| Party | Candidate | FPv% | Count | | | | | | | | | | | |
| Party | Candidate | FPv% | 1 | 2 | 3 | 4 | 5 | 6 | 7 | 8 | 9 | 10 | 11 | 12 |
|---|---|---|---|---|---|---|---|---|---|---|---|---|---|---|
| Fianna Fáil | Brian Crowley | 23.2 | 84,463 | | | | | | | | | | | |
| Fianna Fáil | Gerry Collins | 13.6 | 49,677 | 54,399 | 54,530 | 55,047 | 55,522 | 56,246 | 57,264 | 70,834 | 75,527 | | | |
| Fine Gael | John Cushnahan | 10.1 | 36,906 | 37,319 | 37,448 | 37,553 | 37,836 | 38,488 | 39,331 | 40,444 | 42,726 | 43,115 | 46,889 | 72,018 |
| Progressive Democrats | Desmond O'Malley | 8.7 | 31,674 | 32,287 | 32,440 | 32,596 | 32,928 | 33,916 | 35,957 | 37,178 | 39,165 | 39,516 | 45,371 | 49,655 |
| Fine Gael | Tom Raftery | 8.6 | 31,250 | 31,896 | 32,012 | 32,130 | 32,398 | 32,923 | 34,632 | 35,434 | 37,718 | 38,032 | 40,681 | |
| Independent | Pat Cox | 7.7 | 27,920 | 29,069 | 29,333 | 29,741 | 30,400 | 31,905 | 33,888 | 35,791 | 39,766 | 40,675 | 48,533 | 52,495 |
| Labour | Jim Kemmy | 7.0 | 25,486 | 26,102 | 26,259 | 26,703 | 27,842 | 29,448 | 33,155 | 33,927 | 36,124 | 36,533 | | |
| Fianna Fáil | Paddy Lane | 5.3 | 19,369 | 21,050 | 21,131 | 21,430 | 21,642 | 22,014 | 22,348 | | | | | |
| Independent | Nora Bennis | 5.1 | 18,424 | 18,971 | 19,292 | 19,805 | 20,265 | 21,863 | 24,237 | 24,982 | | | | |
| Democratic Left | Kathleen Lynch | 4.3 | 15,573 | 16,127 | 16,282 | 16,610 | 17,316 | 18,948 | | | | | | |
| Green | Dan Boyle | 2.8 | 10,033 | 10,322 | 10,661 | 11,395 | 11,971 | | | | | | | |
| Workers' Party | Martin O'Regan | 1.7 | 6,270 | 6,367 | 6,524 | 6,981 | | | | | | | | |
| Sinn Féin | Kieran McCarthy | 1.4 | 5,171 | 5,285 | 5,391 | | | | | | | | | |
| Natural Law | Stewart Luck | 0.2 | 890 | 934 | | | | | | | | | | |
| Independent | Conor Moloney | 0.2 | 858 | 901 | | | | | | | | | | |
| Independent | Denis Riordan | 0.2 | 607 | 627 | | | | | | | | | | |
Electorate: 755,176 Valid: 364,571 Spoilt: 5,319 (1.4%) Quota: 72,915 Turnout: 369,890 (49.0%)

=== 1989 election ===
1989 European Parliament election: Munster (5 seats)
| Party | Candidate | FPv% | Count | | | | | | | | | |
| Party | Candidate | FPv% | 1 | 2 | 3 | 4 | 5 | 6 | 7 | 8 | 9 | 10 |
|---|---|---|---|---|---|---|---|---|---|---|---|---|
| Progressive Democrats | Pat Cox | 17.3 | 85,558 | | | | | | | | | |
| Fianna Fáil | Gene Fitzgerald | 13.0 | 64,139 | 64,350 | 64,731 | 65,277 | 66,591 | 68,988 | 72,389 | 92,491 | | |
| Independent | T. J. Maher | 11.2 | 55,499 | 55,972 | 56,653 | 58,324 | 60,851 | 63,515 | 68,895 | 71,223 | 71,738 | 79,107 |
| Fine Gael | Tom Raftery | 8.8 | 43,528 | 43,925 | 44,497 | 44,923 | 46,681 | 48,651 | 49,971 | 50,516 | 50,637 | |
| Fine Gael | John Cushnahan | 8.8 | 43,326 | 44,208 | 45,104 | 46,036 | 47,191 | 48,738 | 50,397 | 51,444 | 51,608 | 79,058 |
| Fianna Fáil | Paddy Lane | 8.3 | 41,152 | 41,351 | 41,558 | 42,024 | 42,516 | 43,542 | 46,303 | 55,224 | 64,287 | 65,671 |
| Fianna Fáil | Jackie Fahey | 7.5 | 37,290 | 37,430 | 37,919 | 38,992 | 39,417 | 40,370 | 42,611 | | | |
| Independent | Patrick Ryan | 6.3 | 30,934 | 31,005 | 31,356 | 32,021 | 33,029 | 35,619 | | | | |
| Labour | Eileen Desmond | 6.1 | 29,979 | 30,355 | 30,830 | 35,709 | 38,051 | 45,684 | 49,435 | 51,112 | 51,334 | 55,407 |
| Workers' Party | Joe Sherlock | 5.4 | 26,828 | 27,000 | 27,382 | 28,221 | 30,710 | | | | | |
| Independent | Joe Noonan | 3.2 | 15,975 | 16,076 | 16,466 | 16,662 | | | | | | |
| Labour | Michael Ferris | 2.8 | 13,843 | 13,927 | 14,150 | | | | | | | |
| Independent | George Salter Townshend | 0.5 | 2,577 | 2,595 | | | | | | | | |
| Independent | William O'Shea | 0.4 | 2,011 | 2,021 | | | | | | | | |
| Independent | Abbey of the Holy Cross Fitzsimons | 0.4 | 1,794 | 1,812 | | | | | | | | |
Electorate: 703,913 Valid: 494,433 Spoilt: 10,786 (2.1%) Quota: 82,406 Turnout: 505,219 (71.8%)

=== 1984 election ===
1984 European Parliament election: Munster (5 seats)
| Party | Candidate | FPv% | Count | | | | | | |
| Party | Candidate | FPv% | 1 | 2 | 3 | 4 | 5 | 6 | 7 |
|---|---|---|---|---|---|---|---|---|---|
| Independent | T. J. Maher | 16.1 | 55,079 | 56,840 | 60,138 | | | | |
| Fine Gael | Tom O'Donnell | 15.7 | 53,832 | 54,313 | 55,689 | 55,923 | 66,537 | | |
| Fianna Fáil | Sylvester Barrett | 13.9 | 47,622 | 48,947 | 49,995 | 50,183 | 52,019 | 52,363 | 53,008 |
| Fine Gael | Tom Raftery | 12.9 | 44,236 | 44,401 | 45,806 | 46,069 | 52,653 | 59,968 | |
| Fianna Fáil | Gene Fitzgerald | 12.6 | 43,036 | 43,987 | 46,179 | 46,498 | 49,456 | 49,729 | 50,578 |
| Fianna Fáil | Noel Davern | 12.5 | 42,863 | 44,100 | 45,397 | 45,703 | 47,644 | 47,999 | 48,694 |
| Labour | Eileen Desmond | 7.6 | 26,162 | 27,080 | 31,374 | 32,160 | | | |
| Workers' Party | Joe Sherlock | 5.1 | 17,304 | 19,945 | | | | | |
| Sinn Féin | Richard Behal | 3.7 | 12,829 | | | | | | |
Electorate: 691,076 Valid: 342,963 Spoilt: 6,216 (1.8%) Quota: 57,161 Turnout: 349,179 (50.5%)

=== 1979 election ===
1979 European Parliament election: Munster (5 seats)
| Party | Candidate | FPv% | Count | | | | | | | | |
| Party | Candidate | FPv% | 1 | 2 | 3 | 4 | 5 | 6 | 7 | 8 | 9 |
|---|---|---|---|---|---|---|---|---|---|---|---|
| Independent | T. J. Maher | 20.0 | 86,208 | | | | | | | | |
| Labour | Eileen Desmond | 12.5 | 53,614 | 54,530 | 57,822 | 58,711 | 62,941 | 67,191 | 69,055 | 72,600 | |
| Fine Gael | Tom O'Donnell | 10.9 | 46,820 | 49,909 | 50,837 | 50,994 | 54,582 | 65,528 | 67,004 | 92,475 | |
| Fianna Fáil | Jerry Cronin | 10.1 | 43,439 | 44,424 | 45,123 | 51,065 | 52,751 | 53,624 | 60,649 | 61,422 | 62,312 |
| Fianna Fáil | Noel Davern | 8.7 | 37,647 | 39,143 | 40,106 | 42,705 | 43,362 | 43,799 | 48,332 | 49,465 | 50,192 |
| Fianna Fáil | Michael Herbert | 7.9 | 34,034 | 35,213 | 35,730 | 38,645 | 38,852 | 39,184 | 46,311 | 47,000 | 47,754 |
| Fianna Fáil | Timothy O'Connor | 6.9 | 29,595 | 30,524 | 31,010 | 32,915 | 33,201 | 33,856 | | | |
| Fine Gael | Jim O'Keeffe | 6.0 | 25,664 | 27,203 | 27,483 | 27,667 | 29,973 | | | | |
| Fine Gael | John Blair | 5.0 | 21,615 | 22,217 | 22,695 | 23,219 | | | | | |
| Fine Gael | Alan Dukes | 5.0 | 21,510 | 24,666 | 25,525 | 25,656 | 33,172 | 39,519 | 40,085 | | |
| Fianna Fáil | Seán French | 3.9 | 16,655 | 16,951 | 17,327 | | | | | | |
| Sinn Féin The Workers Party | Michael Dunphy | 2.7 | 11,526 | 11,701 | | | | | | | |
| Community Democrats | Michael B Crowe | 0.5 | 2,268 | 2,348 | | | | | | | |
Electorate: 641,625 Valid: 430,595 Spoilt: 14,597 (3.3%) Quota: 71,766 Turnout: 445,192 (69.4%)
