= Tom Raftery =

Irish former politician (born 1933)

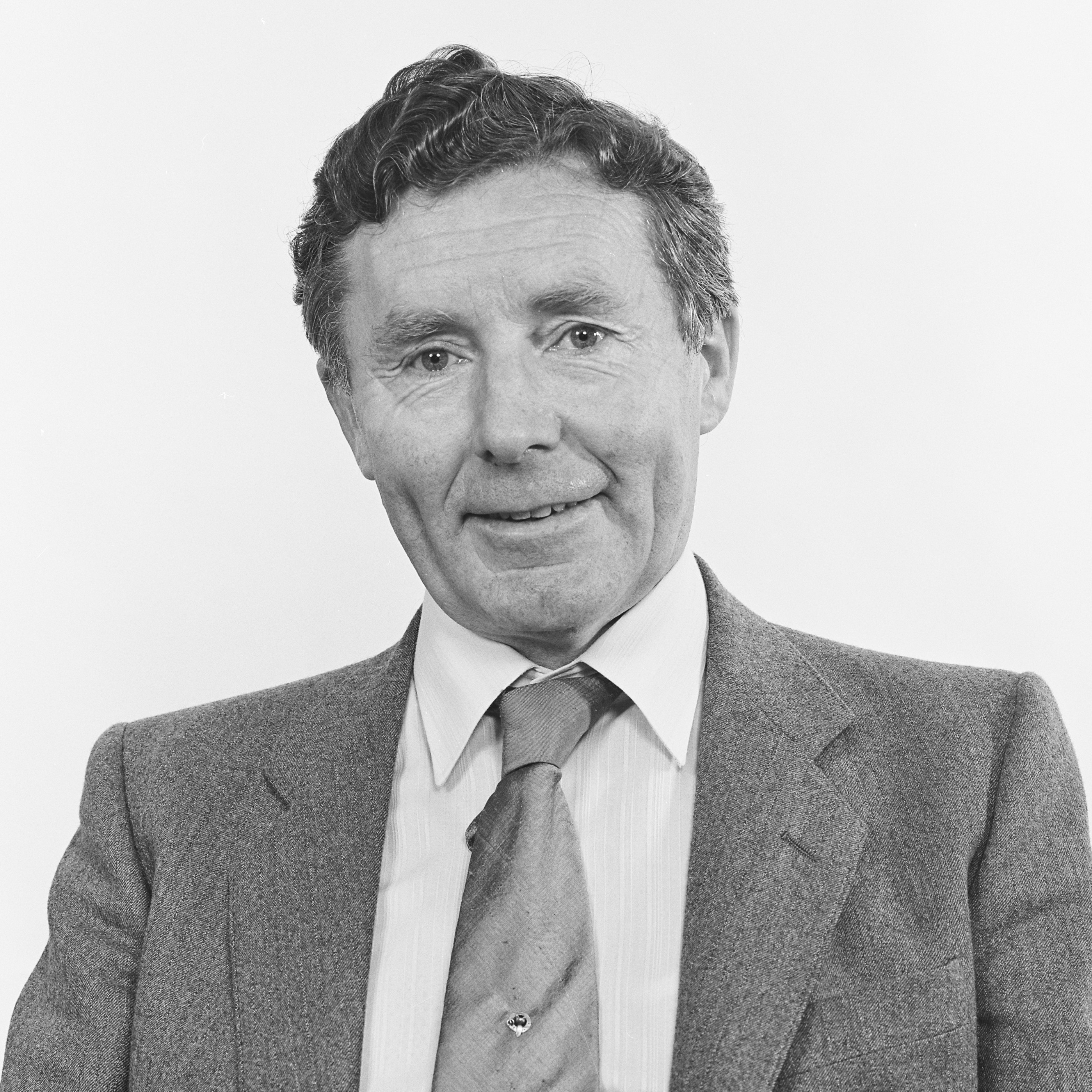

Senator
- In office 1 November 1989 – 17 February 1993
- Constituency: Agricultural Panel

Member of the European Parliament
- In office June 1984 – June 1989
- Constituency: Munster

Personal details
- Born: Thomas Raftery; 15 August 1933 (age 92) Galway, Ireland
- Party: Fine Gael

Tom Raftery (born 15 August 1933) is an Irish former Fine Gael politician and university professor. He was elected to the European Parliament at the 1984 European election for the Munster constituency. He lost his seat at the 1989 European election but was elected to the Seanad at the 1989 Seanad election for the Administrative Panel. He failed to retain his Seanad seat at the 1992 election. He stood unsuccessfully in the Munster constituency at the 1994 European election.
