= Seán Flanagan =

Irish politician (1922–1993)

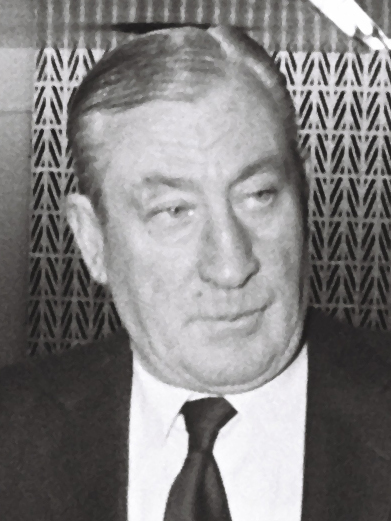
- Flanagan in 1979

Minister for Lands
- In office 2 July 1969 – 14 March 1973
- Taoiseach: Jack Lynch
- Preceded by: Pádraig Faulkner
- Succeeded by: Tom Fitzpatrick

Minister for Health
- In office 13 July 1966 – 2 July 1969
- Taoiseach: Jack Lynch
- Preceded by: Donogh O'Malley
- Succeeded by: Erskine H. Childers

Parliamentary Secretary
- 1965–1966: Industry and Commerce

Member of the European Parliament
- In office 1 July 1979 – 24 May 1989
- Constituency: Connacht–Ulster

Teachta Dála
- In office June 1969 – June 1977
- Constituency: Mayo East
- In office May 1951 – June 1969
- Constituency: Mayo South

Personal details
- Born: 26 January 1922 Ballyhaunis, County Mayo, Ireland
- Died: 5 February 1993 (aged 71) Dublin, Ireland
- Party: Fianna Fáil
- Spouse: Mary Patricia Doherty (m. 1950)
- Children: 7, including Dermot
- Education: University College Dublin

Seán Flanagan (26 January 1922 – 5 February 1993) was an Irish Fianna Fáil politician and Gaelic footballer who served as Minister for Health from 1966 to 1969, Minister for Lands from 1969 to 1973 and Parliamentary Secretary to the Minister for Industry and Commerce from 1965 to 1966. He served as a Member of the European Parliament (MEP) for the Connacht–Ulster constituency from 1979 to 1989. He was as a Teachta Dála (TD) for the Mayo South constituency from 1951 to 1969 and for the Mayo East constituency from 1969 to 1977.

== Early life ==
Flanagan was born in Coolnaha, Aghamore, Ballyhaunis, County Mayo in 1922. He was educated locally, then later at St Jarlath's College in Tuam, County Galway, where he showed enthusiasm for sport. He won two Connacht championship medals with the college in 1939 and 1940. He briefly studied at the seminary at Clonliffe College in Dublin and then enrolled in University College Dublin, where he studied law and qualified as a solicitor.

== Football career ==
Flanagan also played senior Gaelic football for Mayo. He captained the All-Ireland final-winning sides of 1950 and 1951 and won five Connacht senior championship medals in all. He also won two National Football League titles in 1949 and 1954. While still a footballer, Flanagan entered into a career in politics. He would also notably be the last Mayo captain to win the All Ireland for 75 years, until Jack Coyne in the 2026 final.

In recognition of his skills and long-running contribution to the sport, Flanagan was awarded the 1992 All-Time All Star Award as no GAA All Stars Awards were being issued at the time of his playing career. In 1984, the Gaelic Athletic Association centenary year he was honoured by being named on their Football Team of the Century. In 1999, he was again honoured by the GAA by being named on their Gaelic Football Team of the Millennium.

== Political career ==
Flanagan came from a Fianna Fáil family and was recruited into the party in east Mayo. He was elected a Fianna Fáil TD for Mayo South at the 1951 general election, and won a seat—first there, then from 1969 in Mayo East—at each subsequent election until he lost his seat at the 1977 general election.

Flanagan rose rapidly through the party ranks and was appointed a Parliamentary Secretary under Taoiseach Seán Lemass in 1959. Alongside Charles Haughey and Brian Lenihan, he was part of the "mohair suite" brigade of young moderniser TDs. In the Fianna Fáil leadership election in 1966 Flanagan supported Jack Lynch. When Lynch became Taoiseach, Flanagan was promoted to the Cabinet as Minister for Health. Three years later in 1969, he became Minister for Lands. Flanagan lost his seat at the 1977 general election, and effectively retired from domestic politics; however, he was elected to the European Parliament in the first direct elections in 1979. He was re-elected in 1984, and retired from politics in 1989.

Flanagan died on 5 February 1993, at the age of 71.

== See also ==
- List of people on the postage stamps of Ireland

Political offices
New office	Parliamentary Secretary to the Minister for Industry and Commerce; 1965–1966	Office abolished
Preceded by Donogh O'Malley	Minister for Health; 1966–1969	Succeeded by Joseph Brennan
Preceded by Pádraig Faulkner	Minister for Lands; 1969–1973	Succeeded by Tom Fitzpatrick

Dáil	Election	Deputy (Party)	Deputy (Party)	Deputy (Party)	Deputy (Party)	Deputy (Party)
4th	1923	Tom Maguire (Rep)	Michael Kilroy (Rep)	William Sears (CnaG)	Joseph MacBride (CnaG)	Martin Nally (CnaG)
5th	1927 (Jun)	Thomas J. O'Connell (Lab)	Michael Kilroy (FF)	Eugene Mullen (FF)	James FitzGerald-Kenney (CnaG)	Martin Nally (CnaG)
6th	1927 (Sep)	Thomas J. O'Connell (Lab)	Michael Kilroy (FF)	Richard Walsh (FF)	James FitzGerald-Kenney (CnaG)	Martin Nally (CnaG)
7th	1932	Edward Moane (FF)	Michael Kilroy (FF)	Richard Walsh (FF)	James FitzGerald-Kenney (CnaG)	Martin Nally (CnaG)
8th	1933	Edward Moane (FF)	Michael Kilroy (FF)	Richard Walsh (FF)	James FitzGerald-Kenney (CnaG)	Martin Nally (CnaG)
9th	1937	Edward Moane (FF)	Micheál Clery (FF)	Richard Walsh (FF)	James FitzGerald-Kenney (FG)	Martin Nally (FG)
10th	1938	Mícheál Ó Móráin (FF)	Micheál Clery (FF)	Richard Walsh (FF)	James FitzGerald-Kenney (FG)	Martin Nally (FG)
11th	1943	Mícheál Ó Móráin (FF)	Micheál Clery (FF)	Joseph Blowick (CnaT)	James FitzGerald-Kenney (FG)	Dominick Cafferky (CnaT)
12th	1944	Mícheál Ó Móráin (FF)	Micheál Clery (FF)	Joseph Blowick (CnaT)	Richard Walsh (FF)	Dominick Cafferky (CnaT)
12th	1945 by-election	Mícheál Ó Móráin (FF)	Bernard Commons (CnaT)	Joseph Blowick (CnaT)	Richard Walsh (FF)	Dominick Cafferky (CnaT)
13th	1948	Mícheál Ó Móráin (FF)	Bernard Commons (CnaT)	Joseph Blowick (CnaT)	Richard Walsh (FF)	4 seats 1948–1969
14th	1951	Mícheál Ó Móráin (FF)	Seán Flanagan (FF)	Joseph Blowick (CnaT)	Dominick Cafferky (CnaT)	4 seats 1948–1969
15th	1954	Mícheál Ó Móráin (FF)	Seán Flanagan (FF)	Joseph Blowick (CnaT)	Henry Kenny (FG)	4 seats 1948–1969
16th	1957	Mícheál Ó Móráin (FF)	Seán Flanagan (FF)	Joseph Blowick (CnaT)	Henry Kenny (FG)	4 seats 1948–1969
17th	1961	Mícheál Ó Móráin (FF)	Seán Flanagan (FF)	Joseph Blowick (CnaT)	Henry Kenny (FG)	4 seats 1948–1969
18th	1965	Mícheál Ó Móráin (FF)	Seán Flanagan (FF)	Michael Lyons (FG)	Henry Kenny (FG)	4 seats 1948–1969
19th	1969	Constituency abolished. See Mayo East and Mayo West				

Dáil	Election	Deputy (Party)	Deputy (Party)	Deputy (Party)
19th	1969	Seán Flanagan (FF)	Thomas O'Hara (FG)	Martin Finn (FG)
20th	1973	Seán Flanagan (FF)	Seán Calleary (FF)	Martin Finn (FG)
21st	1977	P. J. Morley (FF)	Seán Calleary (FF)	Paddy O'Toole (FG)
22nd	1981	P. J. Morley (FF)	Seán Calleary (FF)	Paddy O'Toole (FG)
23rd	1982 (Feb)	P. J. Morley (FF)	Seán Calleary (FF)	Paddy O'Toole (FG)
24th	1982 (Nov)	P. J. Morley (FF)	Seán Calleary (FF)	Paddy O'Toole (FG)
25th	1987	P. J. Morley (FF)	Seán Calleary (FF)	Jim Higgins (FG)
26th	1989	P. J. Morley (FF)	Seán Calleary (FF)	Jim Higgins (FG)
27th	1992	P. J. Morley (FF)	Tom Moffatt (FF)	Jim Higgins (FG)
28th	1997	Constituency abolished. See Mayo		
