= Tom O'Donnell (politician) =

Irish politician (1926–2020)

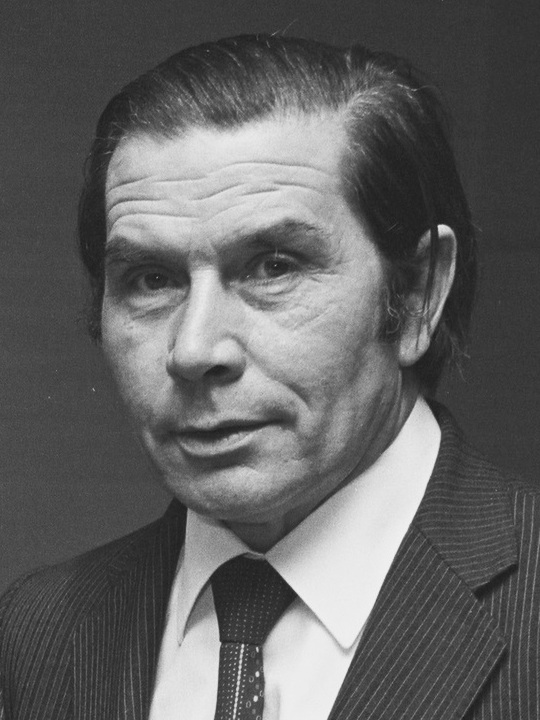
- O'Donnell in 1982

Minister for the Gaeltacht
- In office 14 March 1973 – 5 July 1977
- Taoiseach: Liam Cosgrave
- Preceded by: George Colley
- Succeeded by: Denis Gallagher

Member of the European Parliament
- In office June 1979 – June 1989
- Constituency: Munster

Teachta Dála
- In office October 1961 – February 1987
- Constituency: Limerick East

Personal details
- Born: 30 August 1926 Charleville, County Cork, Ireland
- Died: 8 October 2020 (aged 94) Ballysheedy West, County Limerick, Ireland
- Party: Fine Gael
- Spouse: Helen O'Connor (m. 1984)
- Children: 1
- Relatives: Richard O'Connell (uncle); Kieran O'Donnell (nephew)
- Education: University College Dublin

Thomas G. O'Donnell (30 August 1926 – 8 October 2020) was an Irish Fine Gael politician who served as Minister for the Gaeltacht from 1973 to 1977. He served as a Teachta Dála (TD) for the Limerick East from 1961 to 1987. He also served as a Member of the European Parliament (MEP) for the Munster constituency from 1979 to 1989.

== Career ==
He was born in Charleville, County Cork, in 1926. He was educated at the Crescent College, Salesian College and University College Dublin, where he received a Bachelor of Arts degree. He worked as a teacher and a voluntary community activist before becoming involved in politics.

O'Donnell was first elected to Dáil Éireann at the 1961 general election as a Fine Gael TD for Limerick East. He was Opposition Front Bench spokesperson on Transport, Power and Tourism from 1969 to 1973. He served in the government on one occasion in the National Coalition under Taoiseach Liam Cosgrave between 1973 and 1977 as Minister for the Gaeltacht. He was Opposition Front Bench spokesperson on Telecommunications from 1977 to 1979. O'Donnell was elected to the European Parliament at the 1979 election, and served until 1989. He retired from national politics following the 1987 general election at which he lost his seat. He was spokesperson on Regional Policy for the European People's Party (EPP) from 1979 to 1989.

After his retirement from politics, he became actively involved in the voluntary sector. He was Chairperson of the Irish Peace Institute at the University of Limerick, Chairperson of the PAUL Partnership, Chairperson to the Limerick City and County Strategy Group and the Limerick Employment Pact.

In 2005, he was honoured by Limerick City Council with a civic reception and a special presentation to mark half a century of his political and voluntary services to the people of Limerick City and County.

He married Helen O'Connor from Sligo in 1984; they have one son. His uncle Richard O'Connell was a Cumann na nGaedheal TD for Limerick from 1924 to 1932, and his nephew Kieran O'Donnell is a Fine Gael TD for Limerick City.

O'Donnell died in October 2020 at the age of 94.

== See also ==
- Families in the Oireachtas

Political offices
| Preceded by George Colley | Minister for the Gaeltacht; 1973–1977 | Succeeded by Denis Gallagher |

| Dáil | Election | Deputy (Party) | Deputy (Party) | Deputy (Party) | Deputy (Party) | Deputy (Party) |
|---|---|---|---|---|---|---|
| 13th | 1948 | Michael Keyes (Lab) | Robert Ryan (FF) | James Reidy (FG) | Daniel Bourke (FF) | 4 seats 1948–1981 |
| 14th | 1951 | Michael Keyes (Lab) | Tadhg Crowley (FF) | James Reidy (FG) | Daniel Bourke (FF) | 4 seats 1948–1981 |
| 14th | 1952 by-election | Michael Keyes (Lab) | Tadhg Crowley (FF) | James Reidy (FG) | John Carew (FG) | 4 seats 1948–1981 |
| 15th | 1954 | Michael Keyes (Lab) | Tadhg Crowley (FF) | Donogh O'Malley (FF) | John Carew (FG) | 4 seats 1948–1981 |
| 16th | 1957 | Ted Russell (Ind.) | Paddy Clohessy (FF) | Donogh O'Malley (FF) | John Carew (FG) | 4 seats 1948–1981 |
| 17th | 1961 | Stephen Coughlan (Lab) | Paddy Clohessy (FF) | Donogh O'Malley (FF) | Tom O'Donnell (FG) | 4 seats 1948–1981 |
| 18th | 1965 | Stephen Coughlan (Lab) | Paddy Clohessy (FF) | Donogh O'Malley (FF) | Tom O'Donnell (FG) | 4 seats 1948–1981 |
| 18th | 1968 by-election | Stephen Coughlan (Lab) | Paddy Clohessy (FF) | Desmond O'Malley (FF) | Tom O'Donnell (FG) | 4 seats 1948–1981 |
| 19th | 1969 | Stephen Coughlan (Lab) | Michael Herbert (FF) | Desmond O'Malley (FF) | Tom O'Donnell (FG) | 4 seats 1948–1981 |
| 20th | 1973 | Stephen Coughlan (Lab) | Michael Herbert (FF) | Desmond O'Malley (FF) | Tom O'Donnell (FG) | 4 seats 1948–1981 |
| 21st | 1977 | Michael Lipper (Ind.) | Michael Herbert (FF) | Desmond O'Malley (FF) | Tom O'Donnell (FG) | 4 seats 1948–1981 |
| 22nd | 1981 | Jim Kemmy (Ind.) | Peadar Clohessy (FF) | Desmond O'Malley (FF) | Tom O'Donnell (FG) | Michael Noonan (FG) |
| 23rd | 1982 (Feb) | Jim Kemmy (DSP) | Willie O'Dea (FF) | Desmond O'Malley (FF) | Tom O'Donnell (FG) | Michael Noonan (FG) |
| 24th | 1982 (Nov) | Frank Prendergast (Lab) | Willie O'Dea (FF) | Desmond O'Malley (FF) | Tom O'Donnell (FG) | Michael Noonan (FG) |
| 25th | 1987 | Jim Kemmy (DSP) | Willie O'Dea (FF) | Desmond O'Malley (PDs) | Peadar Clohessy (PDs) | Michael Noonan (FG) |
| 26th | 1989 | Jim Kemmy (DSP) | Willie O'Dea (FF) | Desmond O'Malley (PDs) | Peadar Clohessy (PDs) | Michael Noonan (FG) |
| 27th | 1992 | Jim Kemmy (Lab) | Willie O'Dea (FF) | Desmond O'Malley (PDs) | Peadar Clohessy (PDs) | Michael Noonan (FG) |
| 28th | 1997 | Jim Kemmy (Lab) | Willie O'Dea (FF) | Desmond O'Malley (PDs) | Eddie Wade (FF) | Michael Noonan (FG) |
| 28th | 1998 by-election | Jan O'Sullivan (Lab) | Willie O'Dea (FF) | Desmond O'Malley (PDs) | Eddie Wade (FF) | Michael Noonan (FG) |
| 29th | 2002 | Jan O'Sullivan (Lab) | Willie O'Dea (FF) | Tim O'Malley (PDs) | Peter Power (FF) | Michael Noonan (FG) |
| 30th | 2007 | Jan O'Sullivan (Lab) | Willie O'Dea (FF) | Kieran O'Donnell (FG) | Peter Power (FF) | Michael Noonan (FG) |
| 31st | 2011 | Constituency abolished. See Limerick City and Limerick | | | | |
