= 1989 European Parliament election in Ireland =

- 15 June 1989

15 Irish seats to the European Parliament
- Turnout: 1,675,119 (68.3% ▲20.8 pp)
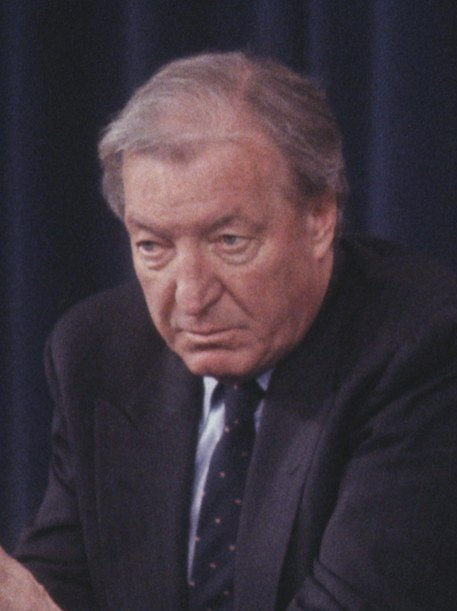

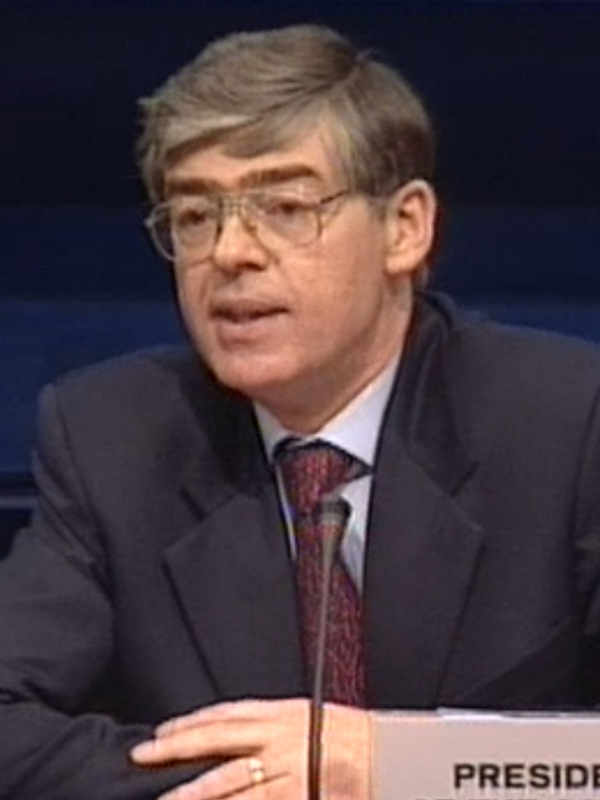

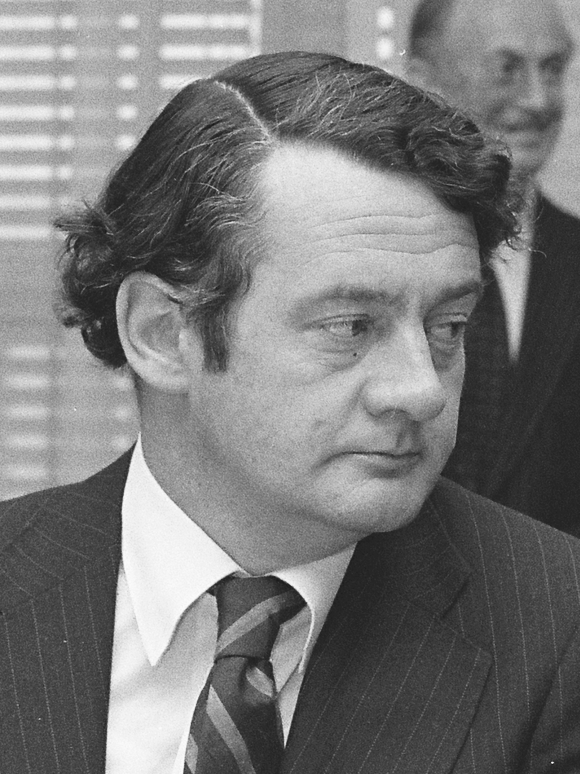

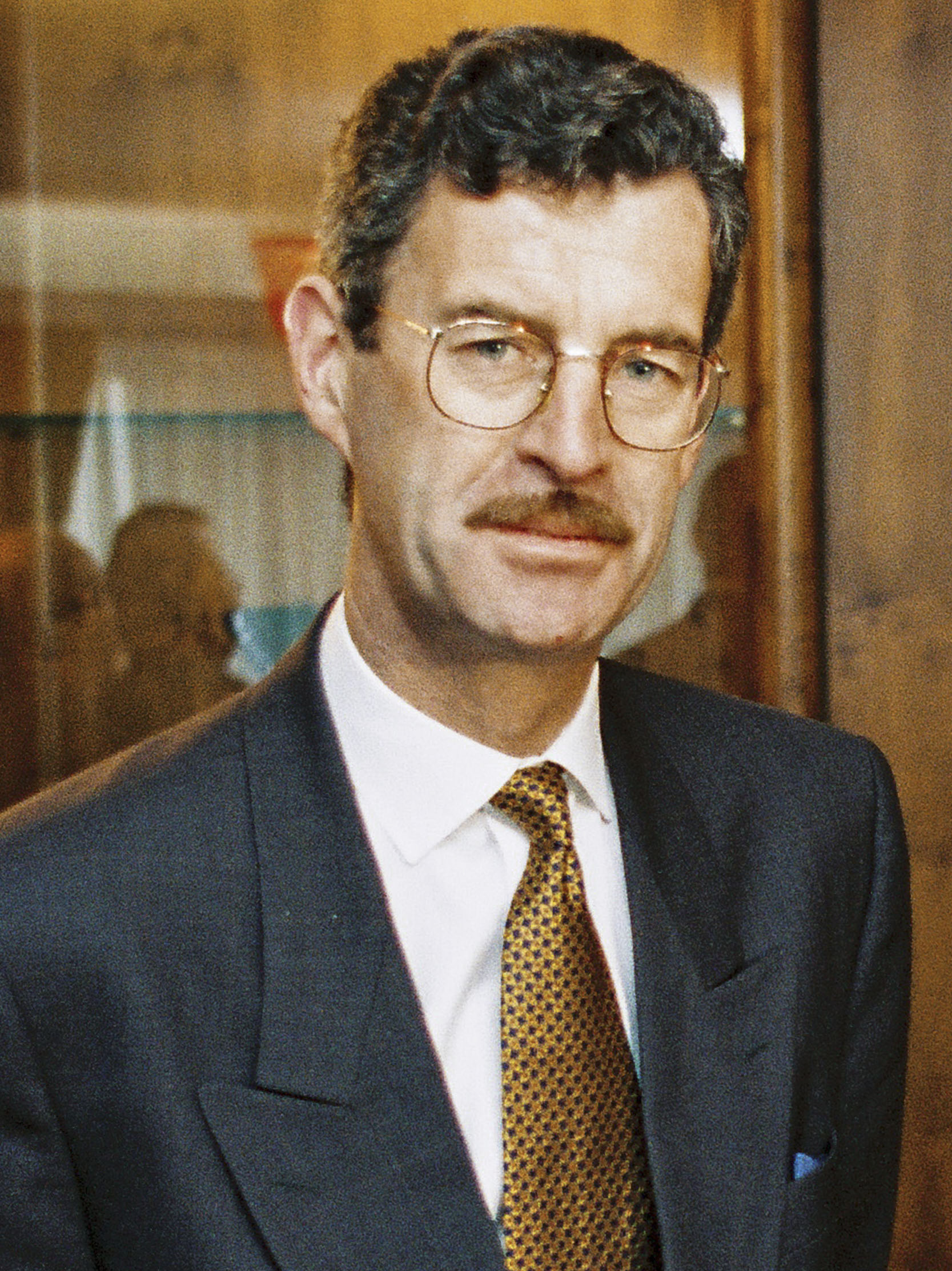

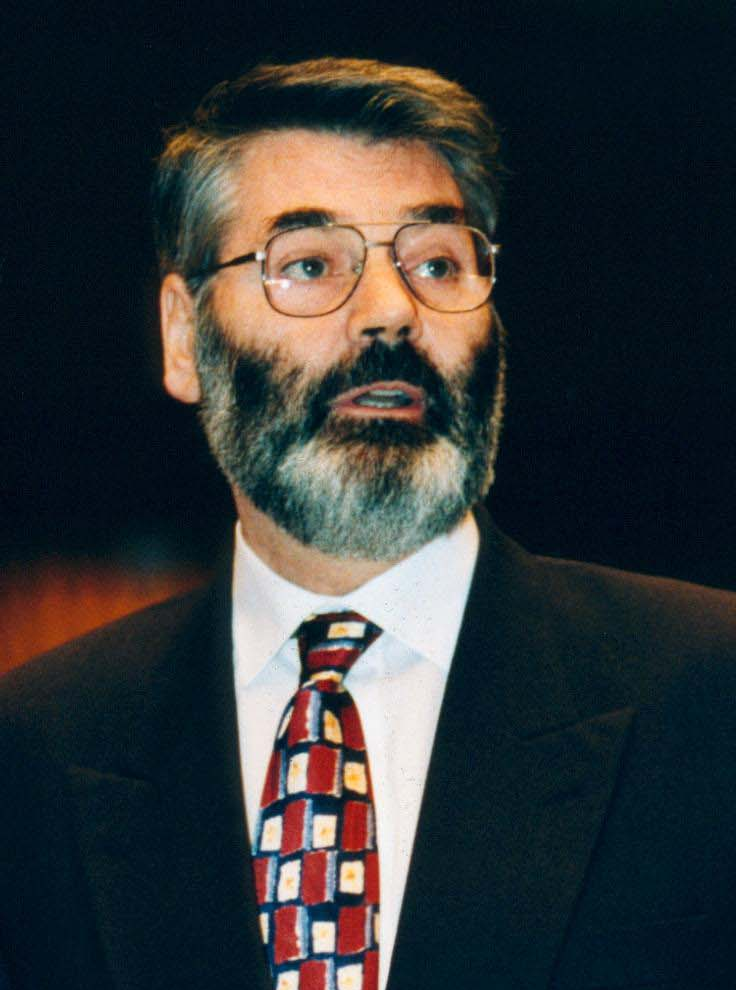

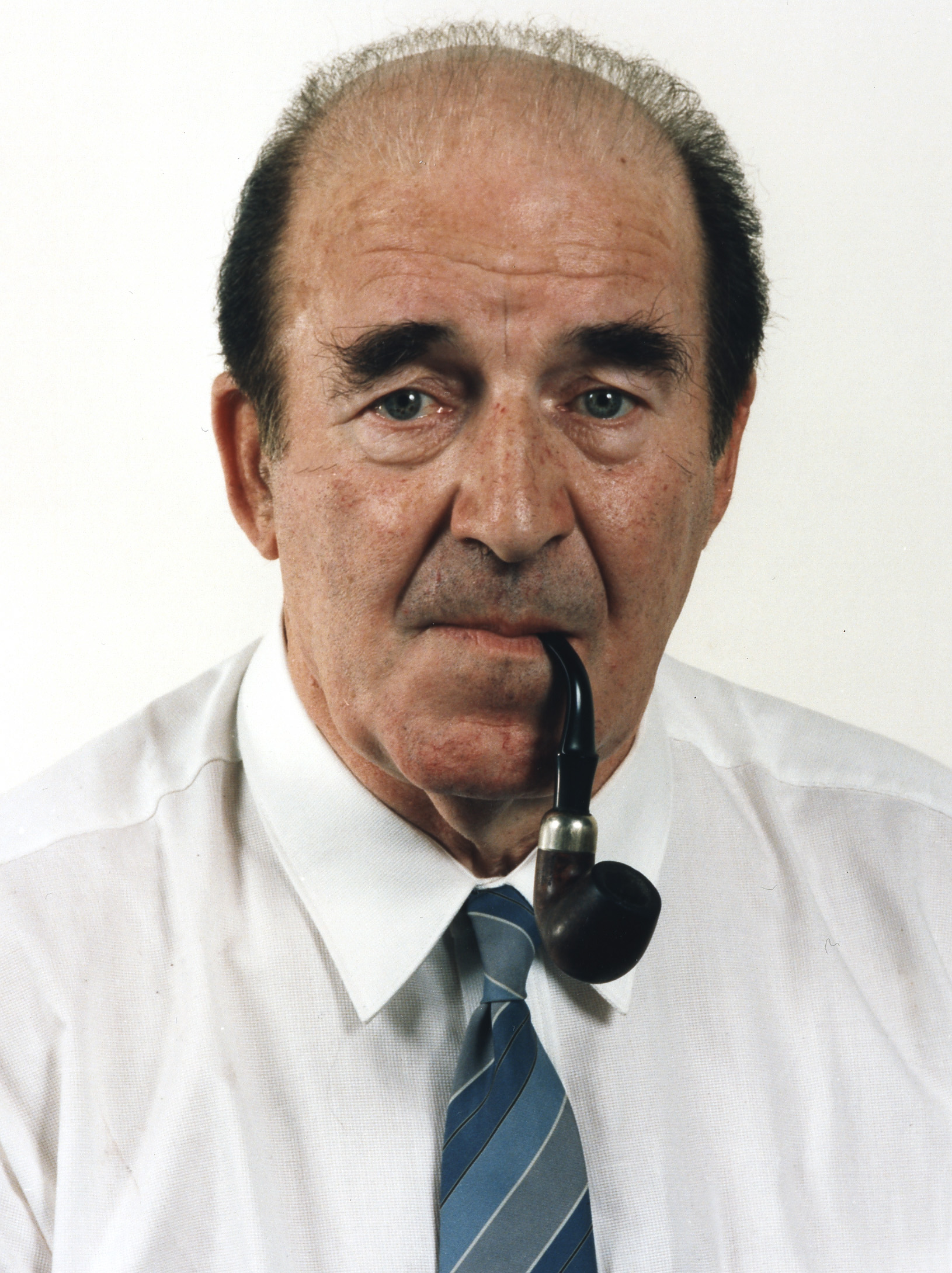

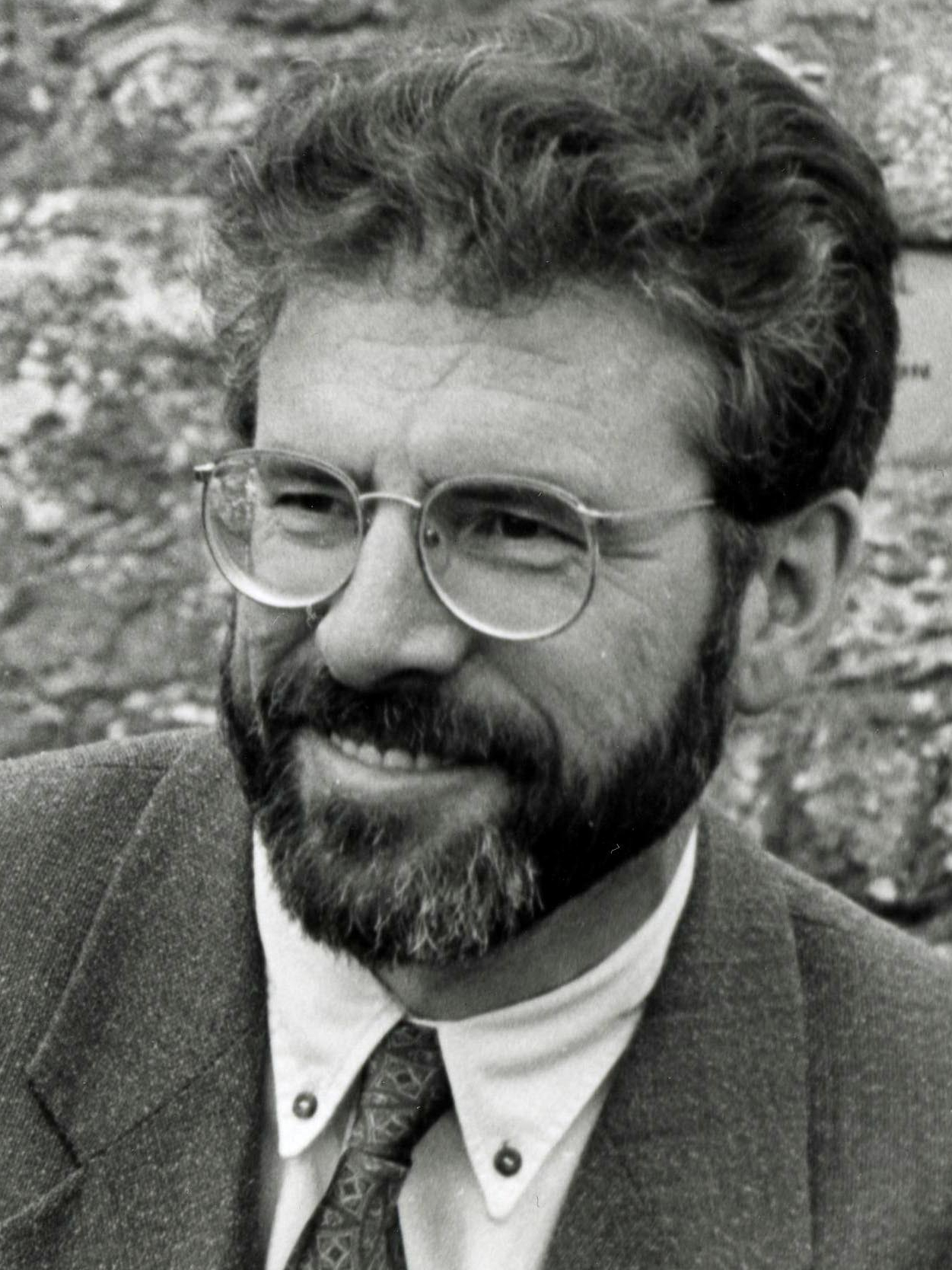
	First party	Second party	Third party
Leader	Charles Haughey	Alan Dukes	Desmond O'Malley
Party	Fianna Fáil	Fine Gael	Progressive Democrats
Alliance	EDA	EPP	ELDR
Leader since	7 December 1979	21 March 1987	21 December 1985
Seats won	6 / 15	4 / 15	1 / 15
Seat change	▼2	▼2	▲1
Popular vote	514,537	353,094	194,059
Percentage	31.5%	21.6%	12.0%
Swing	▼7.7 pp	▼10.6 pp	New Party
	Fourth party	Fifth party	Sixth party
Leader	Dick Spring	Proinsias De Rossa	Neil Blaney
Party	Labour	Workers' Party	Independent Fianna Fáil
Alliance	SOC	Left Unity	RBW
Leader since	1 November 1982	11 November 1988	1972
Seats won	1 / 15	1 / 15	1 / 15
Seat change	▲1	▲1	▲1
Popular vote	155,572	124,679	52,852
Percentage	9.5%	7.7%	3.2%
Swing	▲1.2 pp	▲3.4 pp	▲0.3 pp
	Seventh party	Eighth party
	GP
Leader	—	Gerry Adams
Party	Green	Sinn Féin
Alliance	Green Group	NI
Leader since	—	13 November 1983
Seats won	0 / 15	0 / 15
Seat change	Steady	Steady
Popular vote	61,041	35,923
Percentage	3.7%	2.2%
Swing	▲3.2 pp	▼2.7 pp

The 1989 European Parliament election in Ireland was the Irish component of the 1989 European Parliament election. The election was conducted under the single transferable vote.

== Results ==
Party	Votes	%	+/–	Seats	+/–
Fianna Fáil	514,537	31.51	−7.7	6	−2
Fine Gael	353,094	21.63	−10.6	4	−2
Progressive Democrats	194,059	11.89	New	1	New
Labour Party	155,572	9.53	+1.2	1	+1
Workers' Party	124,679	7.64	+3.4	1	+1
Green Party	61,041	3.74	+3.2	0	0
Independent Fianna Fáil	52,852	3.24	+0.3	1	+1
Sinn Féin	35,923	2.20	−2.7	0	0
Independent	140,971	8.63	+0.9	1	0
Total	1,632,728	100.00	–	15	–
Valid votes	1,632,728	97.47			
Invalid/blank votes	42,391	2.53			
Total votes	1,675,119	100.00			
Registered voters/turnout	2,451,684	68.33			

=== MEPs elected ===
Constituency	Name	Party	EP group
Connacht–Ulster	Mark Killilea	Fianna Fáil	EDA
Connacht–Ulster	Neil Blaney	Independent Fianna Fáil	RBW
Connacht–Ulster	Joe McCartin	Fine Gael	EPP
Dublin	Niall Andrews	Fianna Fáil	EDA
Dublin	Proinsias De Rossa	Workers' Party	GUE/NGL
Dublin	Barry Desmond	Labour	SOC
Dublin	Mary Banotti	Fine Gael	EPP
Leinster	Patrick Lalor	Fianna Fáil	EDA
Leinster	Patrick Cooney	Fine Gael	EPP
Leinster	Jim Fitzsimons	Fianna Fáil	EDA
Munster	Pat Cox	Progressive Democrats	ELDR
Munster	Gene Fitzgerald	Fianna Fáil	EDA
Munster	T.J. Maher	Independent	ELDR
Munster	John Cushnahan	Fine Gael	EPP
Munster	Paddy Lane	Fianna Fáil	EDA

=== Voting details ===
1979–2004 European Parliament Ireland constituencies

Constituency	Electorate	Turnout	Spoilt	Valid Poll	Quota	Seats	Candidates
Connacht–Ulster	464,661	322,664 (69.4%)	10,362 (3.2%)	312,302	78,076	3	13
Dublin	711,416	455,539 (64.0%)	7,137 (1.5%)	448,402	89,681	4	11
Leinster	571,694	391,697 (68.5%)	14,106 (3.6%)	377,591	94,398	3	15
Munster	703,913	505,219 (71.7%)	10,786 (2.2%)	494,433	82,406	5	15
Total	2,451,684	1,675,119 (68.3%)	42,391 (2.6%)	1,632,728	—	15	44

== See also ==
- List of members of the European Parliament for Ireland, 1989–1994 – List ordered by constituency
