= T. J. Maher =

Irish politician and farmers' leader (1922–2002)

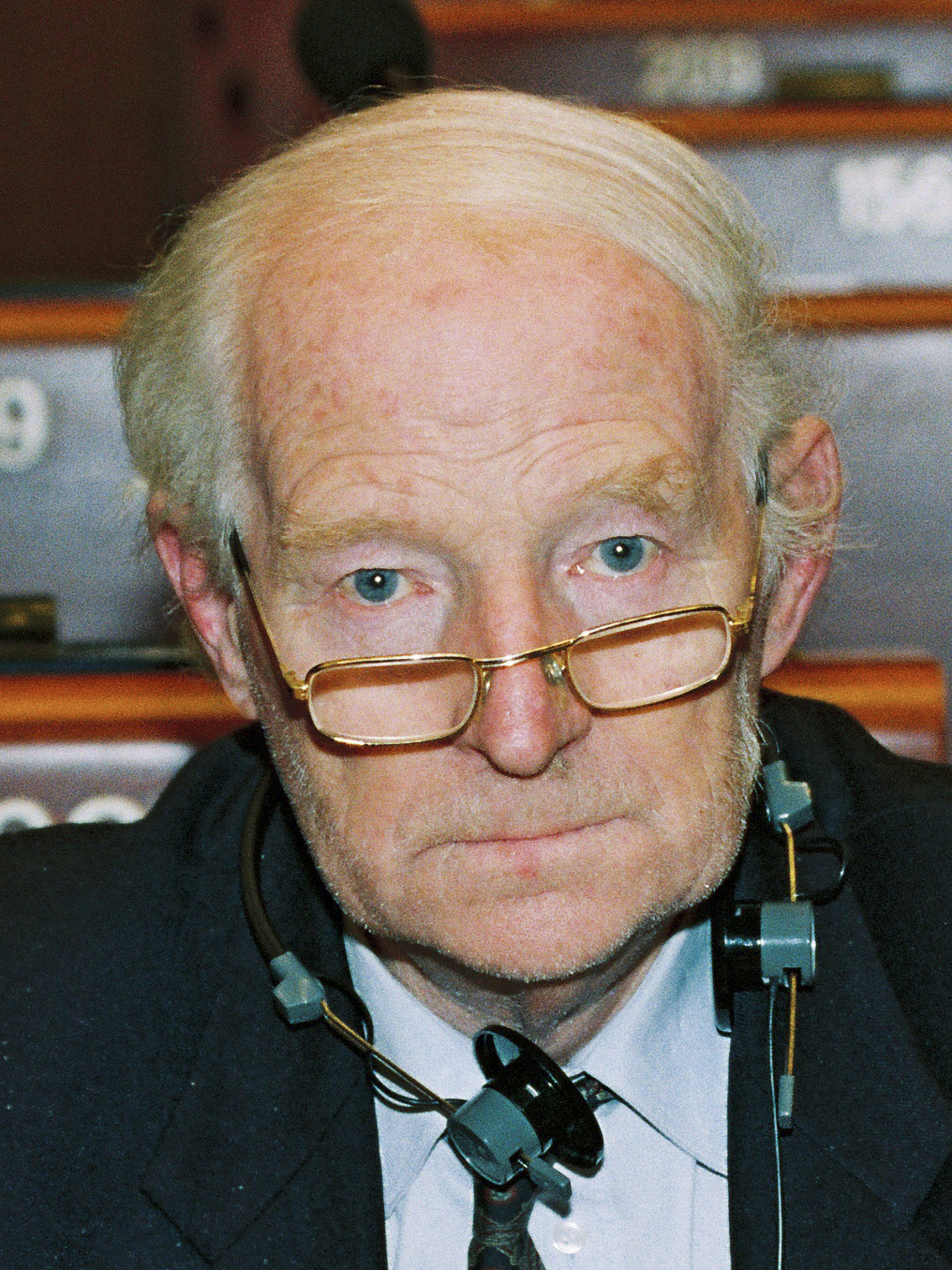
- Maher in 1993

Member of the European Parliament
- In office June 1979 – June 1994
- Constituency: Munster

President of the Irish Farmers' Association
- In office 1967–1976
- Preceded by: Rickard Deasy
- Succeeded by: Paddy Lane

Personal details
- Born: 29 April 1922 Cashel, County Tipperary, Ireland
- Died: 19 April 2002 (aged 79) County Tipperary, Ireland
- Party: Independent
- Spouse: Elizabeth Kennedy (m. 1958)
- Children: 3

Thomas Joseph Maher (29 April 1922 – 19 April 2002) was an Irish politician and farmers' leader.

He was born on a small farm near Cashel, County Tipperary in 1922, the seventh child of Thomas Maher, a farmer, and his wife Julianne Maher. He was educated locally and became a member of Macra na Feirme. He was a founder member of National Farmers' Association (later the Irish Farmers' Association (IFA)) in 1955. In 1958, he married Elizabeth Kennedy from Bansha, near Cashel. They lived at Castlemoyle and had one daughter and two sons. He became the President of the IFA in 1967. In 1977 he became president of the Irish Co-operative Organisation Society (ICOS).

He was first elected to the European Parliament at the 1979 European election for the Munster constituency as an independent and was re-elected at the 1984 and 1989 elections. In the European Parliament, he was a member of the Liberal Democrat and Reform group.

He stood unsuccessfully as an independent candidate at the 1981 general election in the Tipperary South constituency. He retired from politics at the 1994 European election. He was awarded an honorary doctorate by the University of Limerick in 1997.
