= European Progressive Democrats =

Former centre-right political group of the European Parliament (1973–1984)

- European Parliament group
- Name: European Progressive Democrats
- English abbr.: EPD
- French abbr.: DEP
- Formal name: Group of European Progressive Democrats
- From: 16 January 1973
- To: 24 July 1984
- Preceded by: European Democratic Union
- Succeeded by: European Democratic Alliance
- Chaired by: Christian de La Malène
- MEP(s): 22 (July 17, 1979)

The Group of European Progressive Democrats was a heterogeneous political group with seats in the European Parliament between 1973 and 1984. It was mostly composed of French Gaullists and Irish Fianna Fáil.

== History ==
The Gaullists had split from the Liberal Group on 21 January 1965, creating a new Group called the "European Democratic Union". The Group was renamed on 16 January 1973 as the "Group of European Progressive Democrats" when the Gaullists were joined by the Irish Fianna Fáil until 24 July 1984 when they became the "Group of the European Democratic Alliance".

The group was never a close alliance. In 1973, the only common platform was on the issues of regionalism, social policy and the Common Agricultural Policy. Fianna Fáil, an Irish nationalist party, was reluctant to identify too closely with the Gaullists, who also had an alliance with the Conservative Party of the United Kingdom at the time.

== Composition ==
=== Members following the 1979 election ===
Member state	MEPs	Party	MEPs	List of MEP names
France	15	Défence des Intérêts de la France en Europe/Rassemblement pour la République	15	Vincent F.M. Ansquer, Jean-José Clement, Pierre-Bernard Cousté, Gustave Deleau, Eugène L. Remilly, Marie-Madeleine Dienesch, Louise Weiss, Michel J.-P. Debré, Maurice S.R.C. Druon, Pierre Messmer, Jacques Chirac, Claude L.L.P. Labbé, Alain Y.M. Gillot, Hubert Jean Buchou, Christian De La Malène
(Republic of Ireland) Ireland	5	Fianna Fáil	5	Sile De Valera, Jerry Cronin, Noel Michael Davern, Seán Flanagan, Patrick Joseph Lalor
United Kingdom	1	Scottish National Party	1	Winifred M. Ewing
Denmark	1	Fremskridtspartiet	1	Kai Nyborg

=== Members following the 1984 election ===
The EPD ceased to exist once the European Parliament groupings were established following the 1984 election, as the party changed into the European Democratic Alliance.

Member state	MEPs	Party	MEPs
France	15	Rally for the Republic	20
(Republic of Ireland) Ireland	5	Fianna Fáil	8
United Kingdom	1	Scottish National Party	1

== Sources ==
- Konrad-Adenauer-Stiftung
- "Political Data Handbook: OECD Countries", ISBN 0-19-828053-X, Jan-Erik Lane, David McKay, Kenneth Newton 1997
- Europe Politique
- European Parliament MEP Archives
- Centre Virtuel de la Connaissance sur l'Europe (CVCE) via European NAvigator
- Danish Demographic Database, part of the Danish State Archives
- 1999 Election website for Jan Sturm, a candidate for the June Movement
- Website of the Danish June Movement
- Website of the Danish Progress Party
