= Patrick Lalor =

Irish politician and hurler (1926–2016)

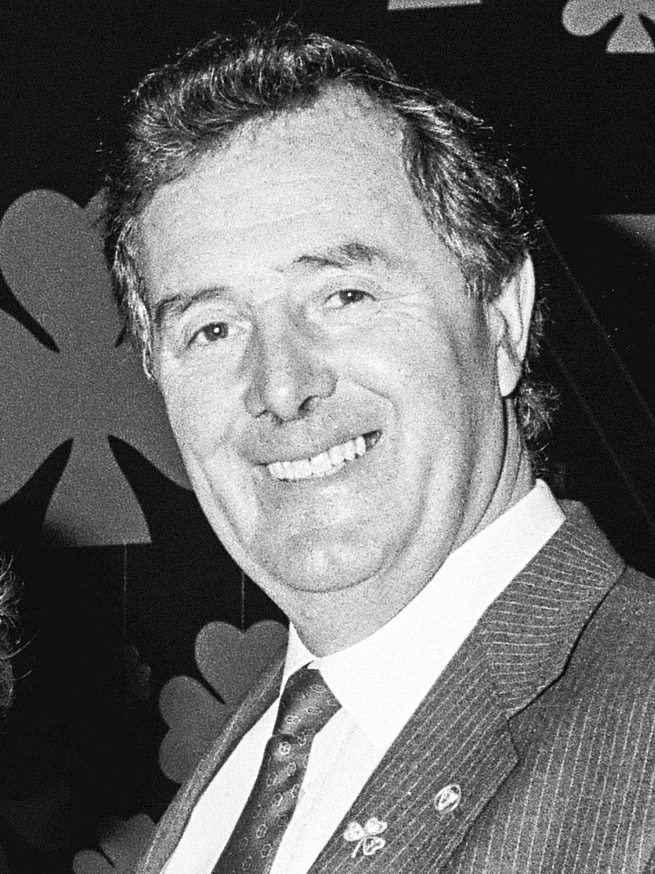
- Lalor in 1985

Member of the European Parliament
- In office June 1979 – June 1994
- Constituency: Leinster

Minister of State/Parliamentary Secretary
- 1977–1979: Government Chief Whip
- 1977–1979: Defence

Minister for Industry and Commerce
- In office 9 May 1970 – 14 March 1973
- Taoiseach: Jack Lynch
- Preceded by: George Colley
- Succeeded by: Justin Keating

Minister for Posts and Telegraphs
- In office 2 July 1969 – 9 May 1970
- Taoiseach: Jack Lynch
- Preceded by: Erskine H. Childers
- Succeeded by: Gerry Collins

Parliamentary Secretary
- 1966–1969: Posts and Telegraphs
- 1966–1969: Transport and Power
- 1965–1966: Agriculture

Teachta Dála
- In office June 1961 – June 1981
- Constituency: Laois–Offaly

Personal details
- Born: 21 July 1926 Portlaois, County Laois, Ireland
- Died: 29 July 2016 (aged 90) Abbeyleix, County Laois, Ireland
- Party: Fianna Fáil
- Spouse: Myra Lalor
- Children: 4

Patrick Joseph Lalor (21 July 1926 – 29 July 2016) was an Irish Fianna Fáil politician and former hurling player for Laois. He was a Teachta Dála (TD) for Laois–Offaly between 1961 and 1981, and a government minister on two separate occasions during the 19th Dáil. He later represented Leinster in the European Parliament from 1979 to 1994.

== Hurling career ==
Lalor was a member of the Laois team that won the Leinster Senior Hurling Championship in 1949. The team went on to compete in the All-Ireland Senior Hurling Championship final but lost to Tipperary. Later that year he helped his club Abbeyleix to win the Laois Senior Hurling Championship. Between 1953 and 1956, Lalor was county secretary of Laois GAA.

He played football and hurling for his club and county for many years and is generally regarded as one of the most skillful hurlers to have pulled Laois jersey. This was evidenced by his selection in 1999 on the Laois Hurling Team of the Millennium.

Lalor played 70 times for Laois senior hurlers, scoring 199 points in his time with the senior team. At the time of his retirement, he was the all-time top scorer for the county and was top of the scoring charts for over 20 years. He also played five times for the senior footballers, scoring 13 points.

== Political career ==
Lalor was elected to Dáil Éireann on his first attempt at the 1961 general election as a Fianna Fáil TD for Laois–Offaly in the 17th Dáil. In 1965, he was appointed Parliamentary Secretary to the Minister for Agriculture. The following year, Lalor became Parliamentary Secretary to the Minister for Transport and Power and Posts and Telegraphs. Following the 1969 election, Lalor joined the cabinet of Jack Lynch as Minister for Posts and Telegraphs. In the cabinet reshuffle that took place following the Arms Crisis in 1970, he took over the Industry and Commerce portfolio, serving in that position until the 1973 general election, when a Fine Gael–Labour Party coalition took power.

Fianna Fáil was re-elected in a landslide victory at the 1977 general election and Lalor became Government Chief Whip and Parliamentary Secretary to the Minister for Defence. In 1979, he was elected to the European Parliament for the Leinster constituency and did not stand for a fifth re-election in the 1981 general election. He was re-elected to the European Parliament in 1984 and 1989, before retiring from politics in 1994. During his time as a member of the European Parliament, he was vice-chair of the parliamentary grouping the European Progressive Democrats and its successor the European Democratic Alliance. He was also a Vice-President of the European Parliament from 1982 to 1987.

== Personal life ==
Lalor died on 29 July 2016 at the age of 90. He was survived by his four children. Fianna Fáil leader Micheál Martin paid tribute to Lalor saying he "had a very distinguished career and represented the people of Laois–Offaly with great pride."

Political offices
New office	Parliamentary Secretary to the Minister for Agriculture; 1965–1966	Succeeded by Don Davern
New office	Parliamentary Secretary to the Minister for Posts and Telegraphs; 1966–1969	Office abolished
New office	Parliamentary Secretary to the Minister for Transport and Power; 1966–1969	Office abolished
Preceded by Erskine H. Childers	Minister for Posts and Telegraphs; 1969–1970	Succeeded by Gerry Collins
Preceded by George Colley	Minister for Industry and Commerce; 1970–1973	Succeeded by Justin Keating
Preceded by John Kelly	Government Chief Whip; 1977–1979	Succeeded by Michael Woods
Preceded by John Kelly	Minister of State at the Department of Defence; 1977–1979	Succeeded by Michael Woods

Dáil	Election	Deputy (Party)	Deputy (Party)	Deputy (Party)	Deputy (Party)	Deputy (Party)
2nd	1921	Joseph Lynch (SF)	Patrick McCartan (SF)	Francis Bulfin (SF)	Kevin O'Higgins (SF)	4 seats 1921–1923
3rd	1922	William Davin (Lab)	Patrick McCartan (PT-SF)	Francis Bulfin (PT-SF)	Kevin O'Higgins (PT-SF)	4 seats 1921–1923
4th	1923	William Davin (Lab)	Laurence Brady (Rep)	Francis Bulfin (CnaG)	Patrick Egan (CnaG)	Seán McGuinness (Rep)
4th	1926 by-election	William Davin (Lab)	Laurence Brady (Rep)	Francis Bulfin (CnaG)	Patrick Egan (CnaG)	James Dwyer (CnaG)
5th	1927 (Jun)	William Davin (Lab)	Patrick Boland (FF)	Thomas Tynan (FF)	John Gill (Lab)	James Dwyer (CnaG)
6th	1927 (Sep)	William Davin (Lab)	Patrick Boland (FF)	Patrick Gorry (FF)	William Aird (CnaG)	James Dwyer (CnaG)
7th	1932	William Davin (Lab)	Patrick Boland (FF)	Patrick Gorry (FF)	Thomas F. O'Higgins (CnaG)	Eugene O'Brien (CnaG)
8th	1933	William Davin (Lab)	Patrick Boland (FF)	Eamon Donnelly (FF)	Thomas F. O'Higgins (CnaG)	Jack Finlay (NCP)
9th	1937	William Davin (Lab)	Patrick Boland (FF)	Patrick Gorry (FF)	Thomas F. O'Higgins (FG)	Jack Finlay (FG)
10th	1938	William Davin (Lab)	Patrick Boland (FF)	Patrick Gorry (FF)	Thomas F. O'Higgins (FG)	Daniel Hogan (FF)
11th	1943	William Davin (Lab)	Patrick Boland (FF)	Patrick Gorry (FF)	Thomas F. O'Higgins (FG)	Oliver J. Flanagan (IMR)
12th	1944	William Davin (Lab)	Patrick Boland (FF)	Patrick Gorry (FF)	Thomas F. O'Higgins (FG)	Oliver J. Flanagan (IMR)
13th	1948	William Davin (Lab)	Patrick Boland (FF)	Patrick Gorry (FF)	Tom O'Higgins, Jnr (FG)	Oliver J. Flanagan (Ind.)
14th	1951	William Davin (Lab)	Patrick Boland (FF)	Peadar Maher (FF)	Tom O'Higgins, Jnr (FG)	Oliver J. Flanagan (Ind.)
15th	1954	William Davin (Lab)	Nicholas Egan (FF)	Peadar Maher (FF)	Tom O'Higgins, Jnr (FG)	Oliver J. Flanagan (FG)
15th	1956 by-election	Kieran Egan (FF)	Nicholas Egan (FF)	Peadar Maher (FF)	Tom O'Higgins, Jnr (FG)	Oliver J. Flanagan (FG)
16th	1957	Kieran Egan (FF)	Nicholas Egan (FF)	Peadar Maher (FF)	Tom O'Higgins, Jnr (FG)	Oliver J. Flanagan (FG)
17th	1961	Kieran Egan (FF)	Nicholas Egan (FF)	Patrick Lalor (FF)	Tom O'Higgins, Jnr (FG)	Oliver J. Flanagan (FG)
18th	1965	Henry Byrne (Lab)	Nicholas Egan (FF)	Patrick Lalor (FF)	Tom O'Higgins, Jnr (FG)	Oliver J. Flanagan (FG)
19th	1969	Ger Connolly (FF)	Bernard Cowen (FF)	Patrick Lalor (FF)	Tom Enright (FG)	Oliver J. Flanagan (FG)
20th	1973	Ger Connolly (FF)	Charles McDonald (FG)	Patrick Lalor (FF)	Tom Enright (FG)	Oliver J. Flanagan (FG)
21st	1977	Ger Connolly (FF)	Bernard Cowen (FF)	Patrick Lalor (FF)	Tom Enright (FG)	Oliver J. Flanagan (FG)
22nd	1981	Ger Connolly (FF)	Bernard Cowen (FF)	Liam Hyland (FF)	Tom Enright (FG)	Oliver J. Flanagan (FG)
23rd	1982 (Feb)	Ger Connolly (FF)	Bernard Cowen (FF)	Liam Hyland (FF)	Tom Enright (FG)	Oliver J. Flanagan (FG)
24th	1982 (Nov)	Ger Connolly (FF)	Bernard Cowen (FF)	Liam Hyland (FF)	Tom Enright (FG)	Oliver J. Flanagan (FG)
24th	1984 by-election	Ger Connolly (FF)	Brian Cowen (FF)	Liam Hyland (FF)	Tom Enright (FG)	Oliver J. Flanagan (FG)
25th	1987	Ger Connolly (FF)	Brian Cowen (FF)	Liam Hyland (FF)	Tom Enright (FG)	Charles Flanagan (FG)
26th	1989	Ger Connolly (FF)	Brian Cowen (FF)	Liam Hyland (FF)	Tom Enright (FG)	Charles Flanagan (FG)
27th	1992	Ger Connolly (FF)	Brian Cowen (FF)	Liam Hyland (FF)	Pat Gallagher (Lab)	Charles Flanagan (FG)
28th	1997	John Moloney (FF)	Brian Cowen (FF)	Seán Fleming (FF)	Tom Enright (FG)	Charles Flanagan (FG)
29th	2002	John Moloney (FF)	Brian Cowen (FF)	Seán Fleming (FF)	Olwyn Enright (FG)	Tom Parlon (PDs)
30th	2007	John Moloney (FF)	Brian Cowen (FF)	Seán Fleming (FF)	Olwyn Enright (FG)	Charles Flanagan (FG)
31st	2011	Brian Stanley (SF)	Barry Cowen (FF)	Seán Fleming (FF)	Marcella Corcoran Kennedy (FG)	Charles Flanagan (FG)
32nd	2016	Constituency abolished. See Laois and Offaly.				
33rd	2020	Brian Stanley (SF)	Barry Cowen (FF)	Seán Fleming (FF)	Carol Nolan (Ind.)	Charles Flanagan (FG)
33rd	2024	Brian Stanley (SF)	(Vacant)	Seán Fleming (FF)	Carol Nolan (Ind.)	Charles Flanagan (FG)
34th	2024	Constituency abolished. See Laois and Offaly.				
