= European Democratic Alliance =

Former centre-right political group of the European Parliament (1984–1995)

- European Parliament group
- Name: European Democratic Alliance
- English abbr.: EDA
- French abbr.: RDE
- Formal name: Group of the European Democratic Alliance
- Political position: Big tent
- From: 24 July 1984
- To: 6 July 1995
- Preceded by: European Progressive Democrats
- Succeeded by: Union for Europe
- Chaired by: Jean-Claude Pasty; Christian de La Malène
- MEP(s): 29 (July 23, 1984); 20 (July 25, 1989); 26 (July 19, 1994)

The European Democratic Alliance (EDA) was a heterogeneous political group in the European Parliament between 1984 and 1995. It consisted mainly of deputies from the French Gaullist Rally for the Republic (RPR) and the Irish Fianna Fáil. The grouping had a generally centre-right outlook, and strongly defended the European Union's Common Agricultural Policy.

== History ==
Following the 1984 elections, the Group of European Progressive Democrats renamed itself on 24 July 1984 to the Group of the European Democratic Alliance. The European Democratic Alliance merged with the Forza Europa group (dominated by MEPs from Forza Italia) to become the "Group Union for Europe" on 6 July 1995.

== Nomenclature ==
The name of the group in English is Group of the European Democratic Alliance in long form, European Democratic Alliance in short form, and the abbreviation is EDA. The equivalents in French are Groupe du Rassemblement des Démocrates Européens, Rassemblement des Démocrates Européens, and RDE. Those French equivalents are sometimes rendered in English as Union of European Democrats and UED.

== Composition ==
=== 1984–1989 ===
Country	Name		Ideology	MEPs	Notes
France	Rally for the Republic	RPR	Gaullism; Liberal conservatism	15 / 434	
France	National Centre of Independents and Peasants	CNI	Liberal conservatism Conservative liberalism	2 / 434	Magdeleine Anglade, Philippe Malaud
France	French Christian Democracy	DCF	Christian democracy	1 / 434	Alfred Coste-Floret
France	Radical Party	PR	Liberalism; Conservative liberalism	1 / 434	Jacqueline Thome-Patenotre
France	Union for French Democracy	UDF	Liberalism; Christian democracy	1 / 434	
Ireland	Fianna Fáil	FF	Irish republicanism Conservatism	8 / 434	
United Kingdom	Scottish National Party	SNP	Scottish nationalism Social democracy	1 / 434	Winifred M. Ewing
Portugal	Democratic Renewal Party (1986–1987)	PRD	Third Way; Populism	1 / 434	José Medeiros Ferreira

=== 1989–1994 ===
Country	Name		Ideology	MEPs	Notes
France	Rally for the Republic	RPR	Gaullism; Liberal conservatism	12 / 518	
France	National Centre of Independents and Peasants	CNI	Liberal conservatism Conservative liberalism	1 / 518	Yvon Briant
Ireland	Fianna Fáil	FF	Irish republicanism Conservatism	6 / 518	
Greece	Democratic Renewal	DA	Conservatism; Economic liberalism	1 / 518	Dimitrios Nianias

=== 1994–1995 ===
Country	Name		Ideology	MEPs	Notes
France	Rally for the Republic	RPR	Gaullism; Liberal conservatism	14 / 567	
Ireland	Fianna Fáil	FF	Irish republicanism Conservatism	7 / 567	
Portugal	CDS – People's Party	CDS–PP	Christian democracy Conservatism	3 / 567	was expelled from EPP after rejection of Maastricht treaty
Greece	Political Spring	PA	National conservatism Populism	2 / 567	

== Sources ==
- Europe Politique
- European Parliament
- European Parliament MEP Archives
- Department of Economics, University of California, Berkeley
- CVCE (Previously European NAvigator)
