= List of female members of the European Parliament for Ireland =

This is a list of women who have served as members of the European Parliament for Ireland.

== List ==
Denotes incumbent member of the European Parliament

Name	Constituency	National party	EP group	Term start	Term end
Eileen Desmond (Note: Personal profile of Eileen Desmond in the European Parliament's database of members. Retrieved 23 July 2016.)	Munster	Labour	PES	1979	1981 (Note: Eileen Desmond resigned on 7 July 1981 and was substituted by Seán Treacy on 9 July 1981.)
Síle de Valera (Note: Personal profile of Síle de Valera in the European Parliament's database of members. Retrieved 23 July 2016.)	Dublin	Fianna Fáil	EPD	1979	1984 (Note: Síle de Valera did not contest the 1984 election.)
Mary Banotti (Note: Personal profile of Mary Banotti in the European Parliament's database of members. Retrieved 23 July 2016.)	Dublin	Fine Gael	EPP (Note: From 1999 to 2009, the European People's Party was known as the European People's Party–European Democrats. (Note: ""Shaping Europe – 25 years of the European People's Party" by Wilfried Martens, President of the European People's Party". Epp-ed.europarl.eu.int.))	1984	2004 (Note: Mary Banotti did not contest the 2004 election.)
Eileen Lemass (Note: Personal profile of Eileen Lemass in the European Parliament's database of members. Retrieved 23 July 2016.)	Dublin	Fianna Fáil	EDA	1984	1989 (Note: Eileen Lemass was defeated at the 1989 election.)
Nuala Ahern (Note: Personal profile of Nuala Ahern in the European Parliament's database of members. Retrieved 23 July 2016.)	Leinster	Green	G	1994	1999 (Note: Both the Irish Green MEPs (Nuala Ahern and Patricia McKenna) sat from 1994 to 1999 as members of The Green Group in the European Parliament. After the 1999 election, they joined the new European Greens–European Free Alliance, an alliance of greens and regionalists.)
Nuala Ahern	Leinster	Green	Greens/EFA	1999	2004 (Note: Nuala Ahern did not contest the 2004 election.)
Bernie Malone (Note: Personal profile of Bernie Malone in the European Parliament's database of members. Retrieved 23 July 2016.)	Dublin	Labour	PES	1994	1999 (Note: Bernie Malone did not contest the 1999 election.)
Patricia McKenna (Note: Personal profile of Patricia McKenna in the European Parliament's database of members. Retrieved 23 July 2016.)	Dublin	Green	G	1994	1999
Patricia McKenna	Dublin	Green	Greens/EFA	1999	2004 (Note: Patricia McKenna did not contest the 2004 election.)
Avril Doyle (Note: Personal profile of Avril Doyle in the European Parliament's database of members. Retrieved 23 July 2016.)	Leinster	Fine Gael	EPP–ED	1999	2009 (Note: Avril Doyle did not contest the 2009 election.)
Dana Rosemary Scallon (Note: Personal profile of Dana Scallon in the European Parliament's database of members. Retrieved 23 July 2016.)	Connacht–Ulster	Independent	EPP–ED	1999	2004 (Note: The Connacht–Ulster constituency was abolished at the 2004 election. Dana Rosemary Scallon contested the new North-West constituency, where she was defeated.)
Marian Harkin (Note: Personal profile of Marian Harkin in the European Parliament's database of members. Retrieved 23 July 2016.)	North-West	Independent	ALDE	2004	2014 (Note: The North-West constituency was abolished at the 2014 election, when Marian Harkin was elected for the new Midlands–North-West constituency.)
Marian Harkin	Midlands–North-West	Independent	ALDE	2014	2019 (Note: Marian Harkin did not contest the 2019 election.)
Mary Lou McDonald (Note: Personal profile of Mary Lou McDonald in the European Parliament's database of members. Retrieved 23 July 2016.)	Dublin	Sinn Féin	GUE/NGL	2004	2009 (Note: Mary Lou McDonald was defeated at the 2009 election.)
Mairead McGuinness (Note: Personal profile of Mairead McGuinness in the European Parliament's database of members. Retrieved 23 July 2016.)	East	Fine Gael	EPP–ED	2004	2014
Mairead McGuinness	Midlands–North-West	Fine Gael	EPP–ED	2014	2020
Kathy Sinnott (Note: Personal profile of Kathy Sinnott in the European Parliament's database of members. Retrieved 23 July 2016.)	South	Independent	IND/DEM	2004	2009 (Note: Kathy Sinnott was defeated at the 2009 election.)
Nessa Childers (Note: Personal profile of Nessa Childers in the European Parliament's database of members. Retrieved 23 July 2016.)	East	Labour	S&D	2009	2013 (Note: Nessa Childers resigned from the parliamentary Labour Party in April 2013.)
Nessa Childers	East	Independent	NI	2013 (Note: Having left Labour, Nessa Childers sat as a Non-Inscrit until the 2014 election.)	2014 (Note: The East constituency was abolished at the 2014 election. Nessa Childers stood in the Dublin constituency, where she won a seat.)
Nessa Childers	Dublin	Independent	S&D	2014	2019 (Note: Nessa Childers did not contest the 2019 election.)
Phil Prendergast (Note: Personal profile of Phil Prendergast in the European Parliament's database of members. Retrieved 5 January 2017.)	South	Labour	S&D	2011 (Note: Alan Kelly was substituted by Phil Prendergast, after he was elected to Dáil Éireann at the 2011 general election.)	2014 (Note: Phil Prendergast was defeated at the 2014 election.)
Emer Costello (Note: Personal profile of Emer Costello in the European Parliament's database of members. Retrieved 5 January 2017.)	Dublin	Labour	S&D	2012 (Note: Proinsias De Rossa was substituted by Emer Costello, after he resigned from the European Parliament in February 2012.)	2014 (Note: Emer Costello was defeated at the 2014 election.)
Lynn Boylan (Note: Personal profile of Lynn Boylan in the European Parliament's database of members. Retrieved 23 July 2016.)	Dublin	Sinn Féin	GUE/NGL	2014	2019 (Note: Lynn Boylan was defeated at the 2019 election.)
Deirdre Clune (Note: Personal profile of Deirdre Clune in the European Parliament's database of members. Retrieved 23 July 2016.)	South	Fine Gael	EPP	2014	2024 (Note: After the 2019 election, Clune did not re-take her seat until the reallocation of seats which took place when the MEPs elected for the United Kingdom vacated their seats on the implementation of Brexit on 31 January 2020.) (Note: Deirdre Clune did not contest the 2024 election.)
Liadh Ní Riada (Note: Personal profile of Liadh Ní Riada in the European Parliament's database of members. Retrieved 23 July 2016.)	South	Sinn Féin	GUE/NGL	2014	2019 (Note: Liadh Ní Riada was defeated at the 2019 election.)
Frances Fitzgerald (Note: Personal profile of Frances Fitzgerald in the European Parliament's database of members. Retrieved 2 March 2020.)	Dublin	Fine Gael	EPP	2019	2024 (Note: Frances Fitzgerald did not contest the 2024 election.)
Clare Daly (Note: Personal profile of Clare Daly in the European Parliament's database of members. Retrieved 2 March 2020.)	Dublin	Inds. 4 Change	GUE/NGL	2019	2024 (Note: Clare Daly was defeated at the 2024 election.)
Grace O'Sullivan (Note: Personal profile of Grace O'Sulliva in the European Parliament's database of members. Retrieved 2 March 2020.)	South	Green	Greens/EFA	2019	2024 (Note: Grace O'Sullivan was defeated at the 2024 election.)
Maria Walsh (Note: Personal profile of Maria Walsh in the European Parliament's database of members. Retrieved 2 March 2020.)	Midlands–North-West	Fine Gael	EPP	2019	Incumbent
Lynn Boylan	Dublin	Sinn Féin	The Left	2024	Incumbent
Nina Carberry	Midlands–North-West	Fine Gael	EPP	2024	Incumbent
Regina Doherty	Dublin	Fine Gael	EPP	2024	Incumbent
Kathleen Funchion	South	Sinn Féin	The Left	2024	Incumbent
Cynthia Ní Mhurchú	South	Fianna Fáil	RE	2024	Incumbent

== Sources ==
- European Parliament office in Ireland – Irish MEPs: 1979–84. Retrieved 23 July 2016.
- European Parliament office in Ireland – Irish MEPs: 1984–89. Retrieved 23 July 2016.
- European Parliament office in Ireland – Irish MEPs: 1989–94. Retrieved 23 July 2016.
- European Parliament office in Ireland – Irish MEPs: 1994–99. Retrieved 23 July 2016.
- European Parliament office in Ireland – Irish MEPs: 1999–2004. Retrieved 23 July 2016.
- European Parliament office in Ireland – Irish MEPs: 2004–09. Retrieved 23 July 2016.
- European Parliament office in Ireland – Irish MEPs: 2009–14. Retrieved 23 July 2016.
- European Parliament office in Ireland – Irish MEPs: 2014–19. Retrieved 5 January 2017.
