= List of members of the European Parliament for Ireland, 1994–1999 =

This is a list of the 15 members of the European Parliament for Ireland elected at the 1994 European Parliament election. They served in the 1994 to 1999 session.

== List ==
Name	Constituency	National party	EP group
Nuala Ahern	Leinster	Green	G
Niall Andrews	Dublin	Fianna Fáil	UFE (Note: Until 4 July 1995 Fianna Fáil was a member of the European Democratic Alliance group.)
Mary Banotti	Dublin	Fine Gael	EPP
Gerry Collins	Munster	Fianna Fáil	UFE
Pat Cox	Munster	Independent	ELDR
Brian Crowley	Munster	Fianna Fáil	UFE
John Cushnahan	Munster	Fine Gael	EPP
Jim Fitzsimons	Leinster	Fianna Fáil	UFE
Pat "the Cope" Gallagher	Connacht–Ulster	Fianna Fáil	UFE
Alan Gillis	Leinster	Fine Gael	EPP
Liam Hyland	Leinster	Fianna Fáil	UFE
Mark Killilea	Connacht–Ulster	Fianna Fáil	UFE
Bernie Malone	Dublin	Labour	PES
Joe McCartin	Connacht–Ulster	Fine Gael	EPP
Patricia McKenna	Dublin	Green	G

== See also ==
- Members of the European Parliament (1994–1999) – List by country
- List of members of the European Parliament (1994–1999) – Full alphabetical list
