= List of members of the European Parliament for Ireland, 1999–2004 =

This is a list of the 15 members of the European Parliament for Ireland elected at the 1999 European Parliament election. They served in the 1999 to 2004 session.

== List ==
Name	Constituency	National party	EP group
Nuala Ahern	Leinster	Green	Greens/EFA
Niall Andrews	Dublin	Fianna Fáil	UEN
Mary Banotti	Dublin	Fine Gael	EPP–ED
Gerry Collins	Munster	Fianna Fáil	UEN
Pat Cox	Munster	Independent	ELDR
Brian Crowley	Munster	Fianna Fáil	UEN
John Cushnahan	Munster	Fine Gael	EPP–ED
Proinsias De Rossa	Dublin	Labour	PES
Avril Doyle	Leinster	Fine Gael	EPP–ED
Jim Fitzsimons	Leinster	Fianna Fáil	UEN
Pat "the Cope" Gallagher†	Connacht–Ulster	Fianna Fáil	UEN
Liam Hyland	Leinster	Fianna Fáil	UEN
Joe McCartin	Connacht–Ulster	Fine Gael	EPP–ED
Patricia McKenna	Dublin	Green	Greens/EFA
Dana Rosemary Scallon	Connacht–Ulster	Independent	EPP–ED

^{†}Replaced during term, see table below for details.

== Changes ==
Party	Outgoing	Constituency	Reason	Date	Replacement
Fianna Fáil	Pat "the Cope" Gallagher	Connacht–Ulster	Gallagher elected to Dáil Éireann at the 2002 general election	June 2002	Seán Ó Neachtain

== See also ==
- Members of the European Parliament (1999–2004) – List by country
- List of members of the European Parliament (1999–2004) – Full alphabetical list
