= John Dardis =

Irish former politician (born 1945)

Senator
- In office 17 September 1997 – 13 September 2007
- In office 1 November 1989 – 17 February 1993
- Constituency: Nominated by the Taoiseach
- In office 17 February 1993 – 17 September 1997
- Constituency: Agricultural Panel

Personal details
- Born: 25 July 1945 (age 81) County Kildare, Ireland
- Party: Progressive Democrats
- Spouse: Beatrice Lane
- Children: 3
- Education: University College Dublin

John Dardis (born 25 July 1945) is an Irish former Progressive Democrats politician who served as a senator from 1989 to 2007. He is a retired farmer and former agricultural journalist.

== Early and personal life ==
Dardis was educated at the Dominican College in Newbridge, County Kildare and at University College Dublin, where he graduated with a degree in Agricultural Science. He is married to Beatrice Lane, and has one son and two daughters. He lives in Newbridge.

== Political career ==
Dardis served in Seanad Éireann from 1989 until he retired in 2007, being nominated by the Taoiseach in 1989, 1997 and 2002, and elected by the Agricultural Panel in 1992 (this was facilitated by an electoral pact with Democratic Left). He was also a member of Kildare County Council for twelve years, representing the Kildare town electoral area from the 1991 local elections until he stood down from the council in 2003 on the abolition of the dual mandate under the Local Government Act 2001.

He stood for election to Dáil Éireann for the Kildare constituency at the 1992, but was unsuccessful. After the division of the constituency, he stood again in the Kildare South constituency at the 1997 general election and again in 2002, but was defeated on both occasions. He also stood for election to the European Parliament in the Leinster constituency at the 1989 and 1994 elections.

=== Salmon drift-nets ===
In October 2005, Dardis launched a Progressive Democrats (PD) policy document which advocated a ban on the use of drift nets to catch salmon in Irish waters, and called for "fair and appropriate" compensation for licence-holders. The policy was agreed at the party's conference in Galway.

The PDs' policy contradicted that of the coalition government (with Fianna Fáil) of which they were part, and came days before a report of the Joint Oireachtas Committee on Communications, Marine and Natural Resources recommended similar measures. The party was accused of "political opportunism" by the Green Party of only taking an interest in the issue in advance of a Government policy shift, and Tommy Broughan of the Labour Party said ""The PDs had seven years to do something about this and they did nothing. Now they are taking a sudden interest in the issue on the eve of our report coming out." In a letter to The Irish Times, Dardis – who is a keen angler, – replied that the party had opposed drift-netting since 1999.

The governmented then established an Independent Salmon Group to review policy, and the group's report in October 2006 recommended radical measures to halt "the catastrophic decline of Irish salmon stocks", including both a ban drift nets and on angling for salmon in major rivers including the Liffey, Boyne, Barrow, Nore and Suir.

In November 2006, the government imposed a ban on drift-netting with effect from January 2007, accompanied by a €30m hardship fund. The decision was publicly criticised by the junior minister responsible, Pat "the Cope" Gallagher, whose Donegal South-West was one of the most-important drift-netting area. He said that he did not accept the basis of the scientific report on which the Cabinet had agreed the policy change. The decision was supported by angling groups, but opposed by sea-fishermen, some 400 of whom marched on the Dáil. The drift-netters' anger was directed at the Cabinet Minister, Noel Dempsey, with one poster in the village of Passage East in County Waterford reading "'Noel Dempsey should be hanged, not Saddam – Fianna Fail Out".

Dardis responded that the government had to act on the scientific advice, and said that "the future of a species that has been central to Irish life has been secured by today's decision".

=== Conflicts of interest in planning ===
In June 2006, Dardis raised concerns about potential conflicts of interest in the planning system, when local council planning officials take up new jobs with development companies operating in the same area. He told the Seanad that "no less than a former county manager of a local authority has taken up a senior position with a development company", noting that the move came only three months after the manager had approved planning permission for a large and controversial development by the same company.

=== 2007 election ===
In 2005, Dardis took office as Chairman of the Progressive Democrats Parliamentary Party. He had been expected to stand again in Kildare South at the 2007 general election but announced his decision in March 2007. Noting that it would be hard for the party to win a seat in the three-seat constituency, he said "We had hoped that the most recent electoral boundary changes would result in a fourth seat for Kildare South but this did not happen". He was instead appointed as chair of the party's election campaign.

In the election, the PDs lost six of their eight seats in the Dáil, including that of the party leader Michael McDowell. Dardis subsequently headed a committee to examine the options for the party leadership, which recommended that the role be taken on by a senator or councillor to take on the party leadership (the party rules then required that the position must be held by a TD). A meeting of the party's General council on 16 February 2008 changed the rules to allow any senator, councillor or any party member with the support of 20 other members to stand for the party's leadership.
