= 1994 European Parliament election in Ireland =

- 9 June 1994

15 seats to the European Parliament
- Turnout: 1,157,296 (44.0% ▼24.3 pp)
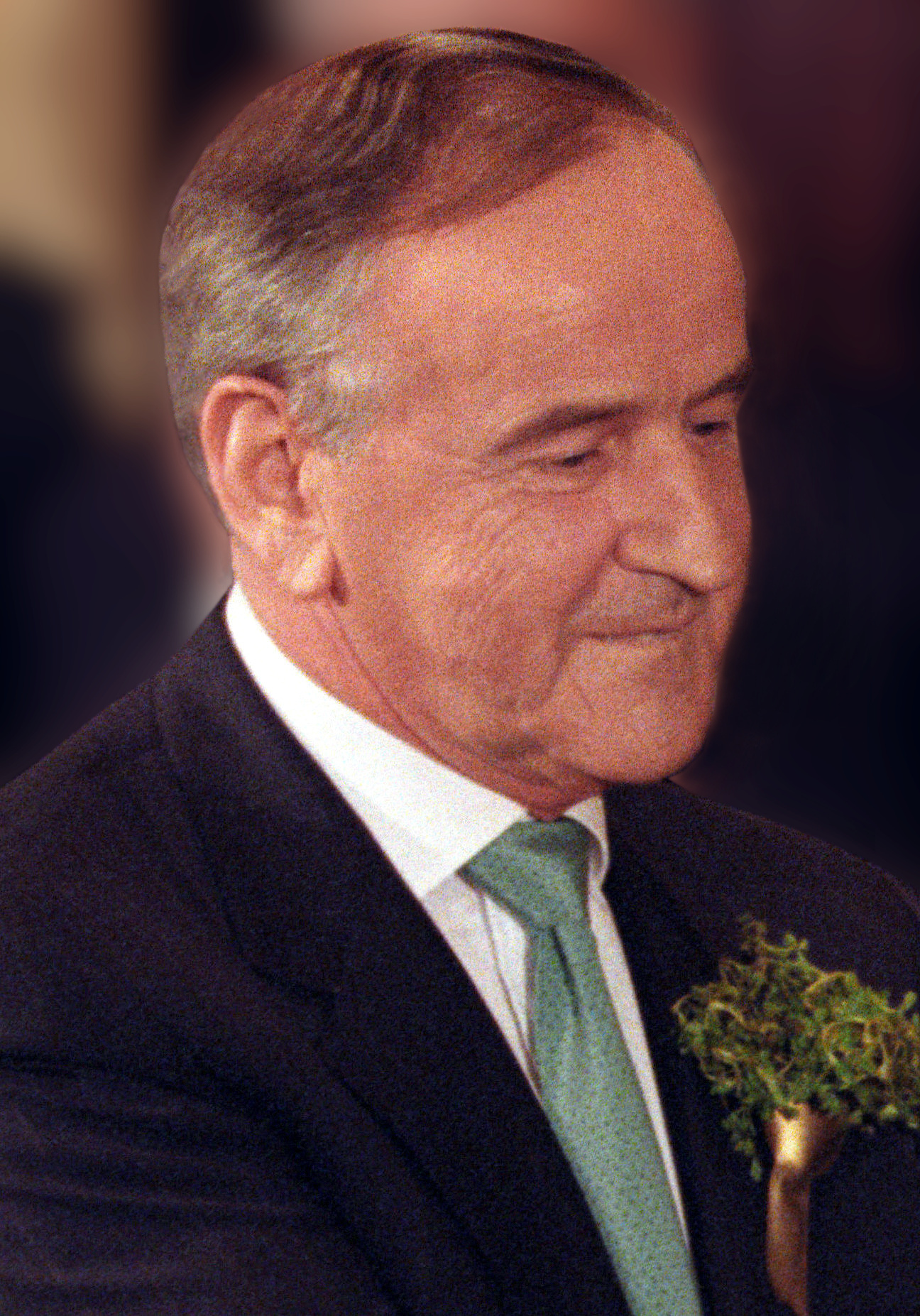

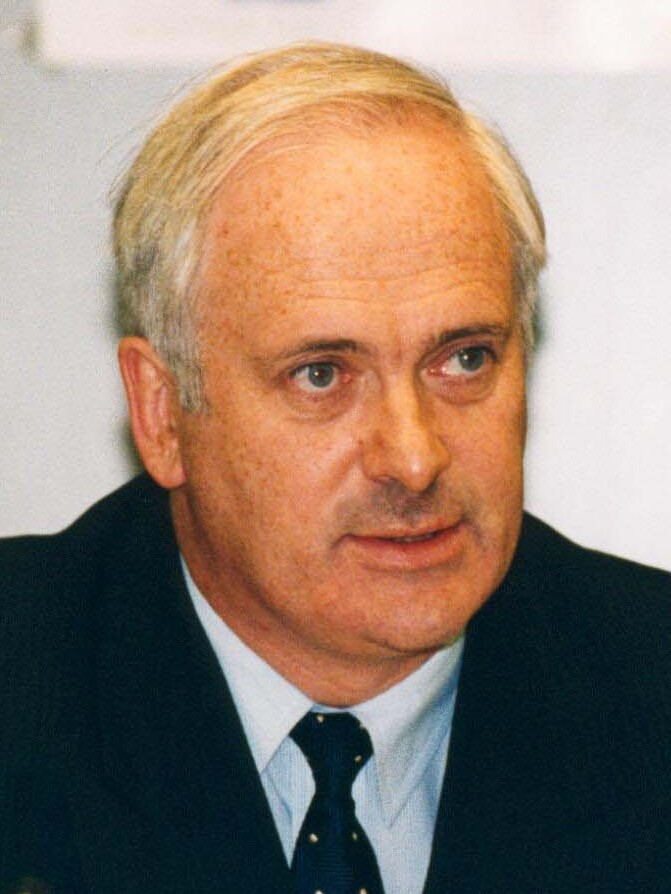

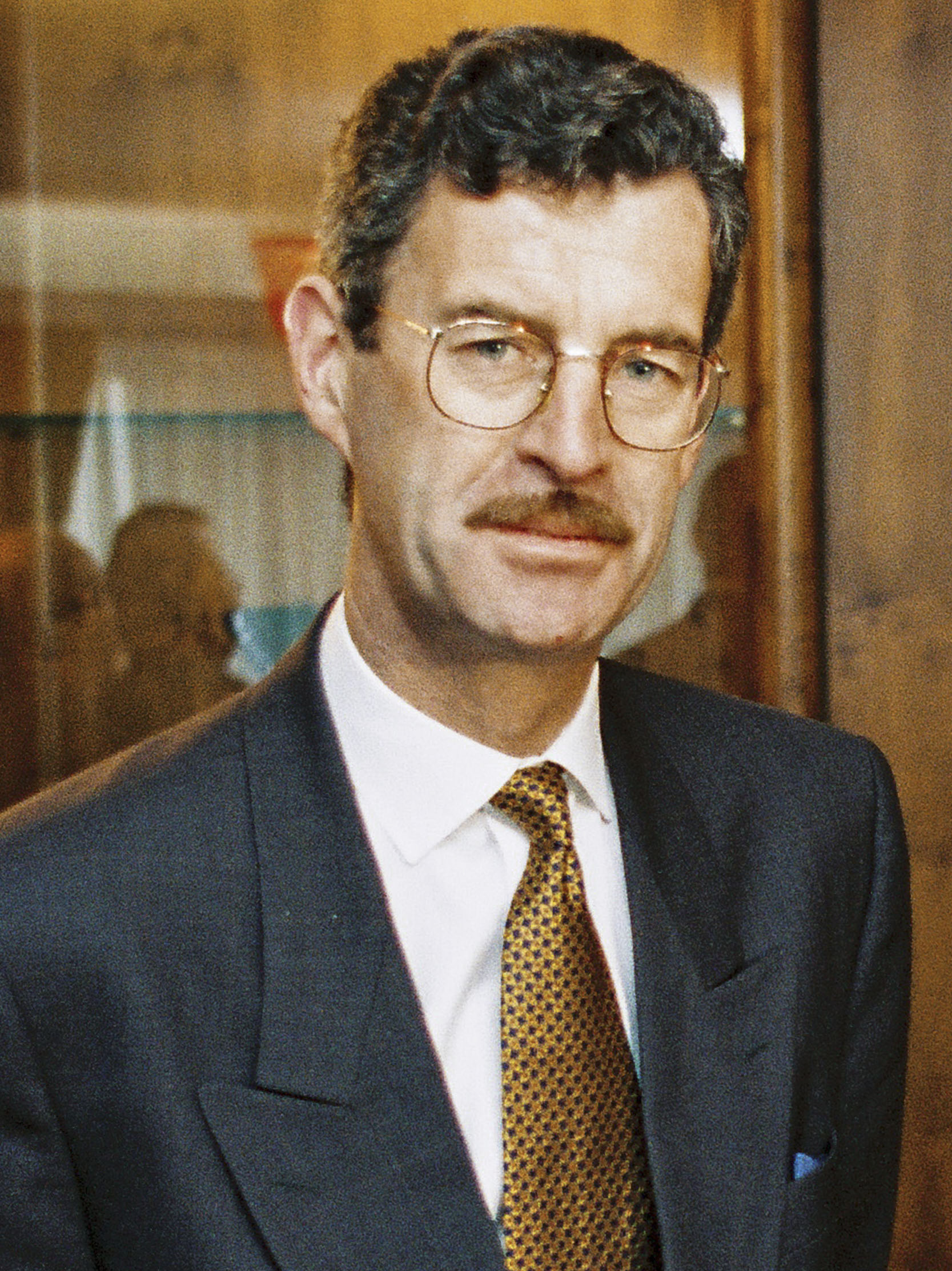

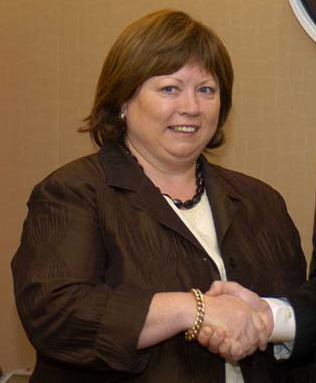

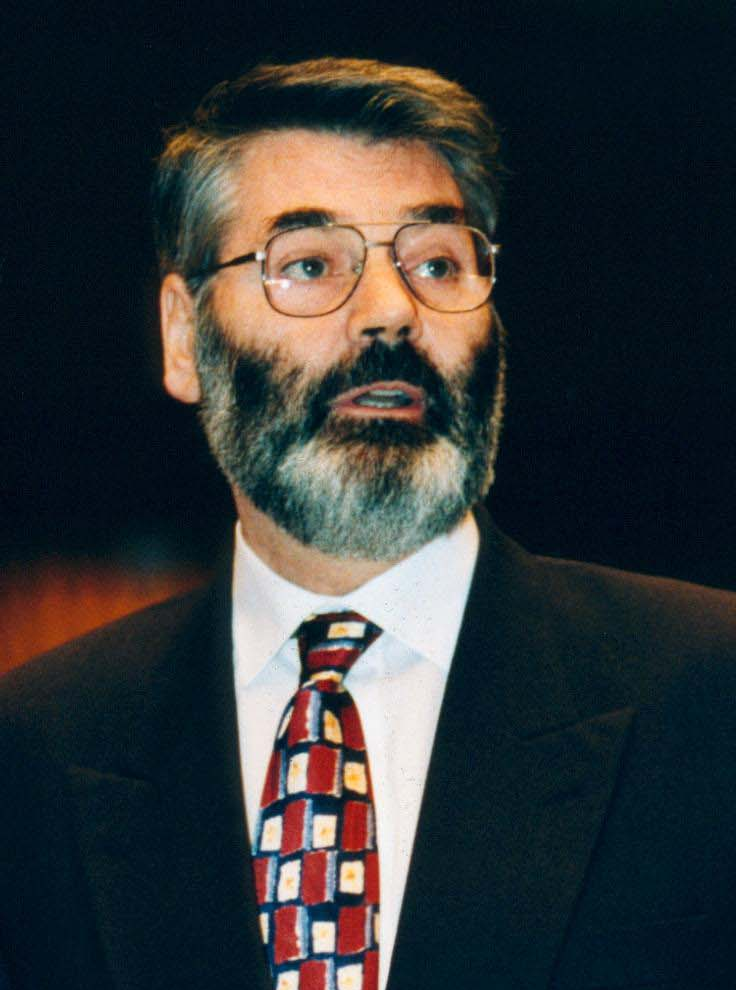

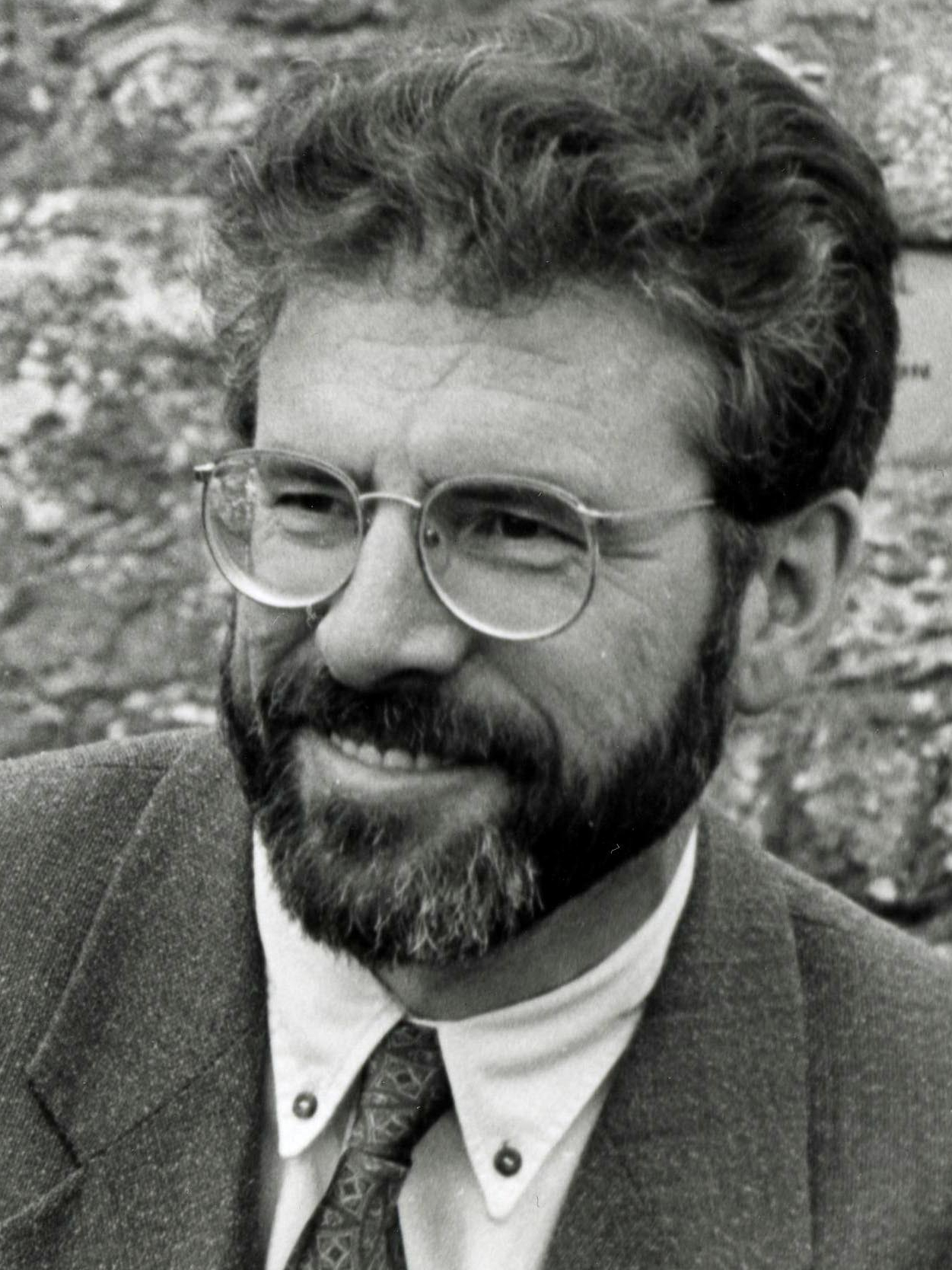
	First party	Second party	Third party
			Green
Leader	Albert Reynolds	John Bruton	None
Party	Fianna Fáil	Fine Gael	Green
Alliance	EDA	EPP	Green Group
Leader since	6 February 1992	20 November 1990	6 November 2001
Last election	31.5%, 6 seats	21.6%, 4 seats	7.9%, 2 seats
Seats won	7 / 15	4 / 15	2 / 15
Seat change	▲1	▼2	0
Popular vote	398,066	276,095	90,046
Percentage	35.0%	24.3%	7.9%
Swing	▲3.5 pp	▲2.7 pp	▲4.2 pp
	Fourth party	Fifth party	Sixth party
Leader	Dick Spring	Mary Harney	Proinsias De Rossa
Party	Labour	Progressive Democrats	Democratic Left
Alliance	PES	ELDR
Leader since	1 November 1982	12 October 1993	1992
Last election	9.5%, 1 seats	12.0%, 1 seats	New
Seats won	1 / 15	0 / 15	0 / 15
Seat change	0	▼1	New
Popular vote	124,972	73,696	39,706
Percentage	11.0 %	6.5 %	3.5%
Swing	▲1.5 pp	▼5.5 pp	New
	Seventh party	Eighth party
		Workers'
Leader	Gerry Adams	Marian Donnelly
Party	Sinn Féin	Workers' Party
Alliance	NI
Leader since	13 November 1983	11 November 1988
Last election	2.2%, 0 seats	7.7%, 1 seats
Seats won	0 / 15	0 / 15
Seat change	Steady	▼1
Popular vote	33,823	22,100
Percentage	3.0%	1.9%
Swing	▲0.8 pp	▼5.8 pp

The 1994 European Parliament election in Ireland was the Irish component of the 1994 European Parliament election. The election was conducted under the single transferable vote. Local elections were held on the same day for borough councils, urban district councils and town commissioners.

== Campaign ==
In 1992, a general election in Ireland led to the Labour Party's best results to date, paving the way for Dick Spring to lead his party into coalition with Fianna Fáil. The 1994 local and European elections were seen in some quarters as a mid-term report on that coalition's performance. The strong result by the Green Party in particular was interpreted as a warning that left-leaning middle class voters were moving away from Labour.

The election was notable for how some parties ran "parachute candidates" (like Orla Guerin for Labour) who did not resonate with voters as well as incumbent, grassroots campaigners.

The popularity of President Mary Robinson led to parties presenting more female candidates than usual, four of whom became MEPs on this occasion.

== Results ==
Party	Votes	%	+/–	Seats	+/–
Fianna Fáil	398,066	35.00	+3.5	7	+1
Fine Gael	276,095	24.27	+2.7	4	0
Labour Party	124,972	10.99	+1.5	1	0
Green Party	90,046	7.92	+4.2	2	+2
Progressive Democrats	73,696	6.48	−5.5	0	−1
Democratic Left	39,706	3.49	New	0	New
Sinn Féin	33,823	2.97	+0.8	0	0
Workers' Party	22,100	1.94	−5.8	0	−1
Independent	78,986	6.94	−1.7	1	0
Total	1,137,490	100.00	–	15	–
Valid votes	1,137,490	98.29			
Invalid/blank votes	19,806	1.71			
Total votes	1,157,296	100.00			
Registered voters/turnout	2,631,575	43.98			

=== MEPs elected ===
Constituency	Name	Party	EP group
Connacht–Ulster	Pat "the Cope" Gallagher	Fianna Fáil	EDA
Connacht–Ulster	Mark Killilea	Fianna Fáil	EDA
Connacht–Ulster	Joe McCartin	Fine Gael	EPP
Dublin	Patricia McKenna	Green	G
Dublin	Mary Banotti	Fine Gael	EPP
Dublin	Niall Andrews	Fianna Fáil	EDA
Dublin	Bernie Malone	Labour	PES
Leinster	Liam Hyland	Fianna Fáil	EDA
Leinster	Alan Gillis	Fine Gael	EPP
Leinster	Jim Fitzsimons	Fianna Fáil	EDA
Leinster	Nuala Ahern	Green	G
Munster	Brian Crowley	Fianna Fáil	EDA
Munster	Gerry Collins	Fianna Fáil	EDA
Munster	John Cushnahan	Fine Gael	EPP
Munster	Pat Cox	Independent	ELDR

=== Voting details ===
1979–2004 European Parliament Ireland constituencies

Constituency	Electorate	Turnout	Spoilt	Valid Poll	Quota	Seats	Candidates
Connacht–Ulster	496,352	237,601 (47.8%)	4,971 (2.1%)	232,630	58,158	3	9
Dublin	755,486	280,761 (37.2%)	2,917 (1.1%)	277,844	55,569	4	15
Leinster	624,561	269,044 (43.1%)	6,599 (2.4%)	262,445	52,490	4	12
Munster	755,176	369,890 (48.9%)	5,319 (1.4%)	364,571	72,915	4	16
Total	2,631,575	1,157,296 (43.9%)	19,806 (1.7%)	1,137,490	—	15	52

== See also ==
- List of members of the European Parliament for Ireland, 1994–1999 – List ordered by constituency
