= Alan Gillis =

Irish politician (1936–2022)

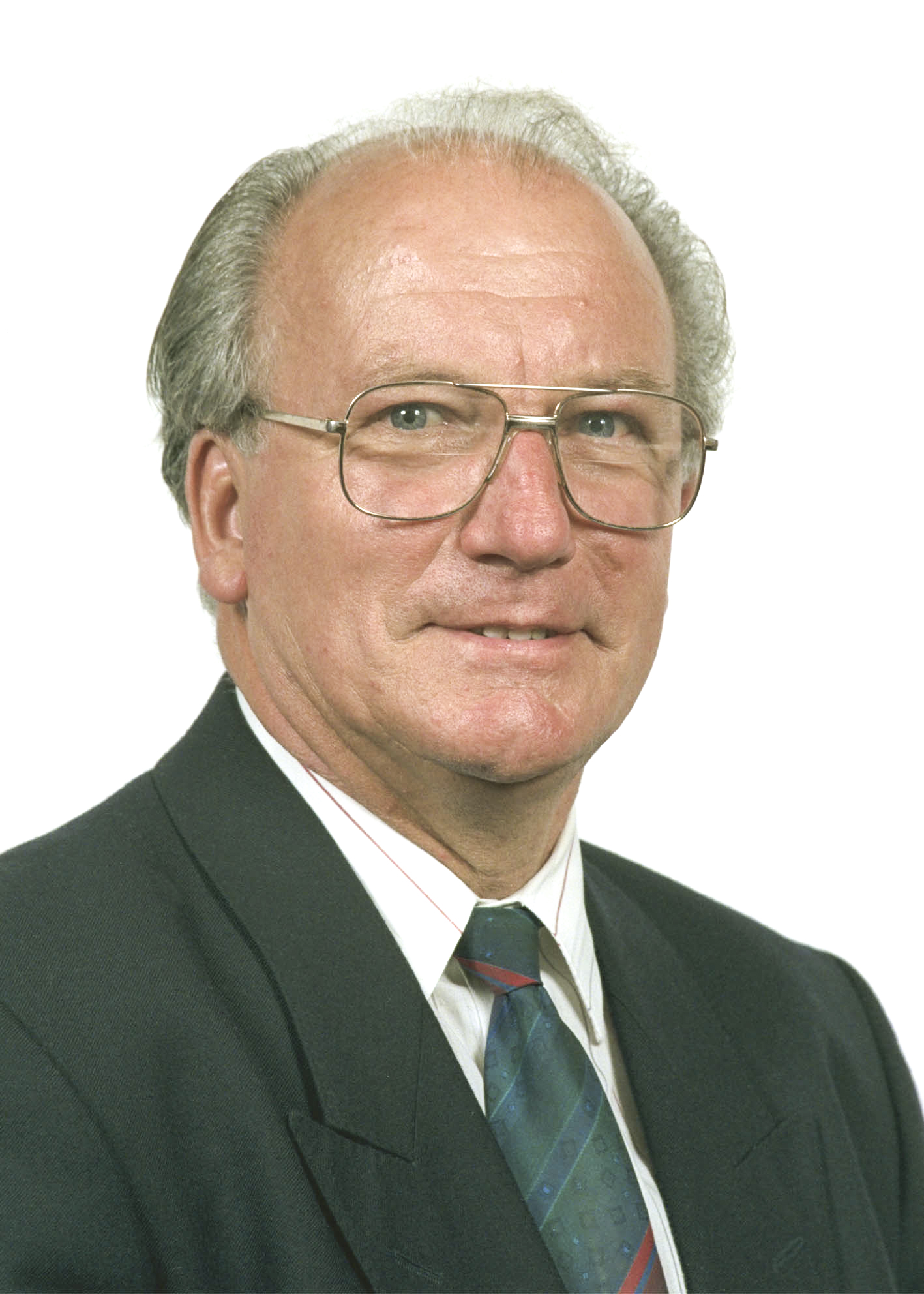
- Gillis in 1994

Member of the European Parliament
- In office 1 July 1994 – 11 June 1999
- Constituency: Leinster

Personal details
- Born: 22 September 1936 County Kildare, Ireland
- Died: 6 May 2022 (aged 85) County Wicklow, Ireland
- Party: Fine Gael
- Spouse: Irene Gillis
- Children: 5

Alan Leslie Gillis (22 September 1936 – 6 May 2022) was an Irish Fine Gael politician and farmers' leader. He was president of the Irish Farmers' Association from 1990 to 1994. He was elected to the European Parliament at the 1994 European election for the Leinster constituency. He was a member of the Committee on Agriculture and Rural Development in the European Parliament.

He lost his seat at the 1999 European election to party running mate Avril Doyle. He stood unsuccessfully as a candidate at the 2007 general election in the Kildare South constituency.

He died on 6 May 2022.
