= Jack Fitzsimons =

Irish architect and politician (1930–2014)

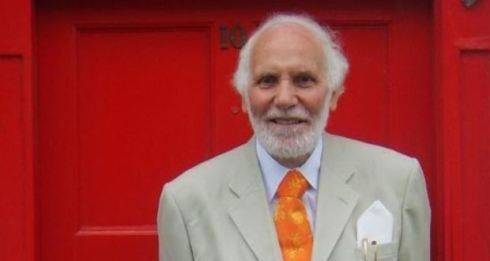
- Fitzsimons in 2007

Senator
- In office 23 February 1983 – 1 November 1989
- Constituency: Industrial and Commercial Panel

Personal details
- Born: 26 April 1930; Carlanstown, County Meath, Ireland
- Died: 4 November 2014 (aged 84); Navan, County Meath, Ireland
- Political party: Fianna Fáil
- Occupation: Architect, politician and writer

Jack Fitzsimons (26 April 1930 – 4 November 2014) was an Irish chartered architect and surveyor based in Kells, County Meath. He was a Fianna Fáil member of Seanad Éireann, who was elected to the Seanad in 1983 by the Industrial and Commercial Panel, and re-elected in 1987.

His contributions to debates such as the amendments to the National Monuments Bill highlighted a well informed approach to heritage that was both practical and principled. In that debate, he also referred to the preservation of thatched cottages which was later to be the subject a detailed book. He lost his seat at the 1989 election.

He resigned from Fianna Fáil in 1989, within hours of that election and his letter to the then Fianna Fáil general secretary, Frank Wall highlighted his criticism of Charles Haughey on the grounds that there was "no ideology, no consistency, no positive approach" within Fianna Fáil, and that debate was stifled, as a key driver in his decision.

He subsequently ran as an independent candidate for the 1994 European Parliament elections for the Leinster constituency, getting 6,752 votes (2.6%) based on a manifesto which included a strong anti-hunting and anti-hare coursing policy. He continued as activist against aspects of planning including the approach of Meath County Council to regulation of septic tanks.

== Publications ==
He is well known for publishing Bungalow Bliss under the Kells Arts Studio label. There was a strong social context to this publication as at the time, architects' fees were high and the book was intended to make affordable designs available at a low cost. Bungalow Bliss, which was first published in 1971 and reprinted 10 times, explained the detail of all aspects of building a bungalow, from planning laws to how to put in a septic tank. As a book, its influence has been debated as significant and as a phrase it has entered common parlance in mainstream media and was referenced in books such as The Pope's Children. He responded directly to the various controversies that grew up around Bungalow Bliss in his book called Bungalow Bashing. In an essay titled "The House that Jack Built" in Ireland Unbound (a collection of 20 essays edited by Michel Peillon and Mary P. Corcoran, on the rapid transformation of Ireland as it entered the 21st century), Stephen Quilley addresses a disagreement between Jack Fitzsimons and journalist Frank McDonald who coined the phrase "Bungalow Blitz" as part of a series of articles attacking the "spreading fungus" of the proliferation of ribbon development bungalows in Ireland. In his contribution Quilley highlights the country's planning laws rather than the architectural qualities of the bungalows as being the main problem. The essay refers to one of the core drivers of Bungalow Bliss which was that "bright modern bungalows were synonymous with an escape from rural poverty and domestic drudgery" (p. 94). In 2020, Hugh Wallace (architect and presenter) announced a property makeover series inspired by Bungalow bliss featuring four 1970s, 80s and 90s bungalows.

He also published a further range of books on aspects of Meath, heritage, and politics as well as some fiction. These publications included a detailed and personal study of the thatched cottages of Meath illuminated by his own photographs of these dwellings and a history of his native parish of Kilbeg in County Meath, where he attended school in the village of Carlanstown. In his last year, he completed a collection of short stories titled "The Pilates of Geblik". This collection was posthumously published by Kells Publishing Company in 2016 and publicly launched by Thomas Byrne (TD).
