= Bernie Malone =

Irish former politician (born 1948)

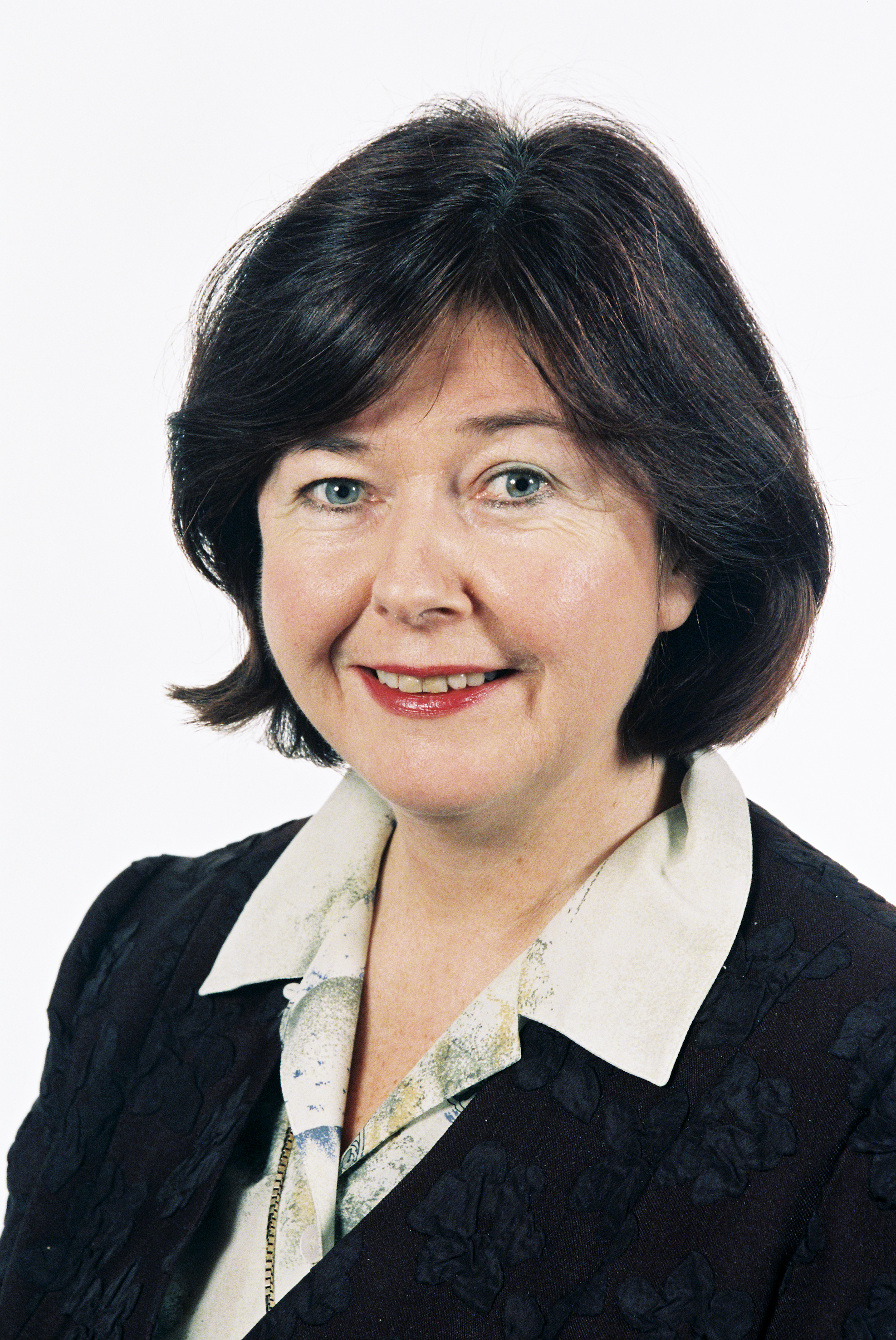
- Malone, c. 1994

Member of the European Parliament
- In office 9 June 1994 – 11 June 1999
- Constituency: Dublin

Personal details
- Born: 26 March 1948 (age 78) Dublin, Ireland
- Party: Labour Party
- Education: University College Dublin

Bernie Malone (born 26 March 1948) is an Irish former Labour Party politician. She was elected to Dublin County Council in 1979 for the Malahide area, and was later a member of Fingal County Council. She served as chairperson of Dublin County Council in the 1980s. She was elected to the European Parliament for the Dublin constituency at the 1994 European election. Malone was selected as the only Labour Party candidate at the party convention; however, the party leader Dick Spring added Orla Guerin to the ticket. There was some friction between the candidates; Malone was elected, whereas Guerin polled well but was not elected.

Malone was a member of the Party of European Socialists in the European Parliament. She lost her seat at the 1999 European election to her party colleague Proinsias De Rossa.

Malone was educated by the Dominicans in Eccles Street and earned a BCL from University College Dublin, going on to train as a solicitor. She also holds a degree from the Miltown Institute and an MA from the Mater Dei Institute.
