= 1999 European Parliament election in Ireland =

- 11 June 1999

15 seats to the European Parliament
- Turnout: 1,438,287 (50.2% ▲6.2 pp)
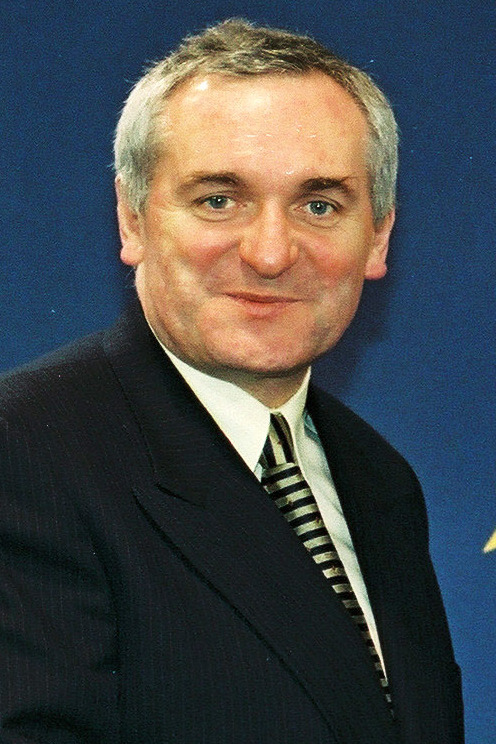

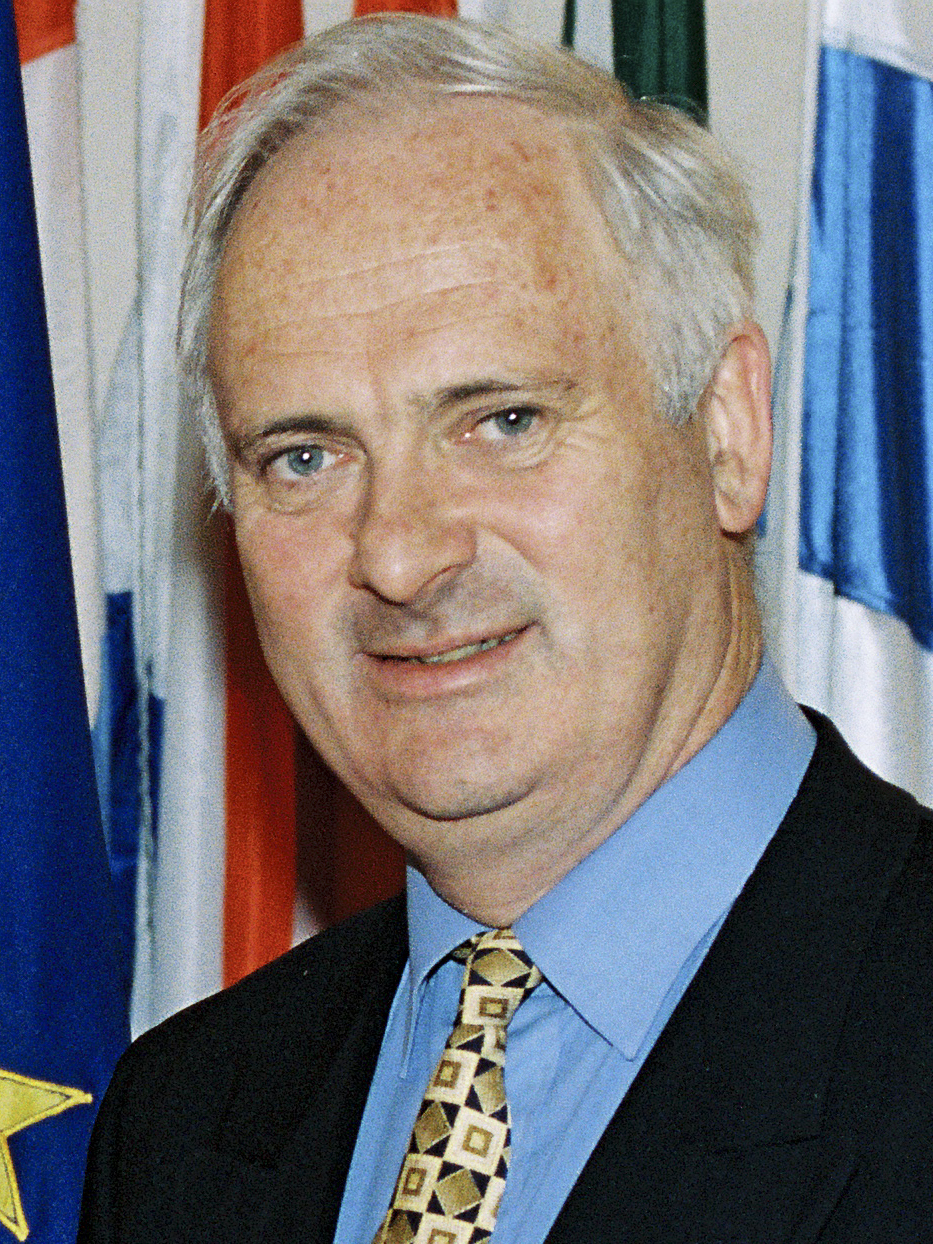

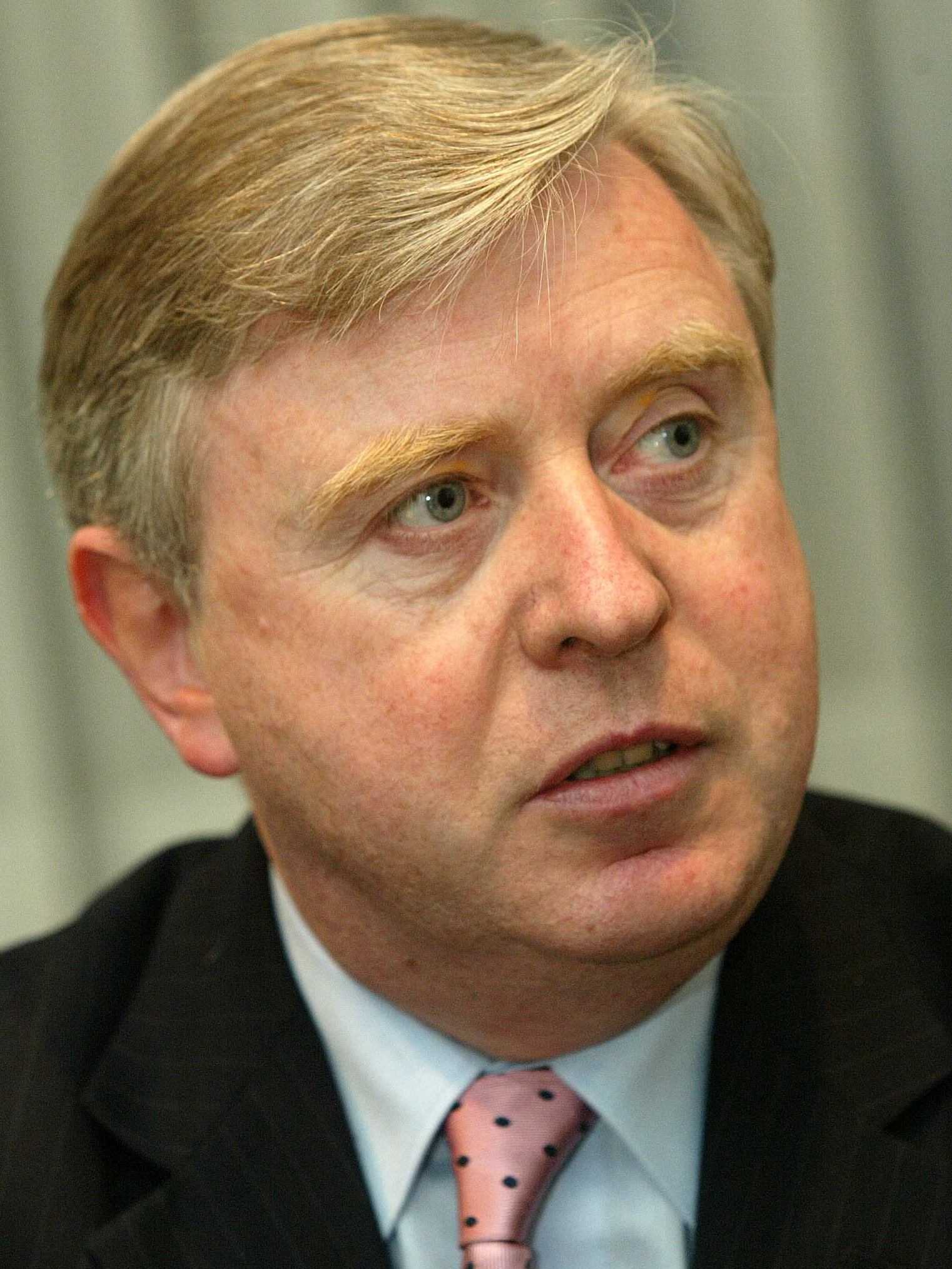

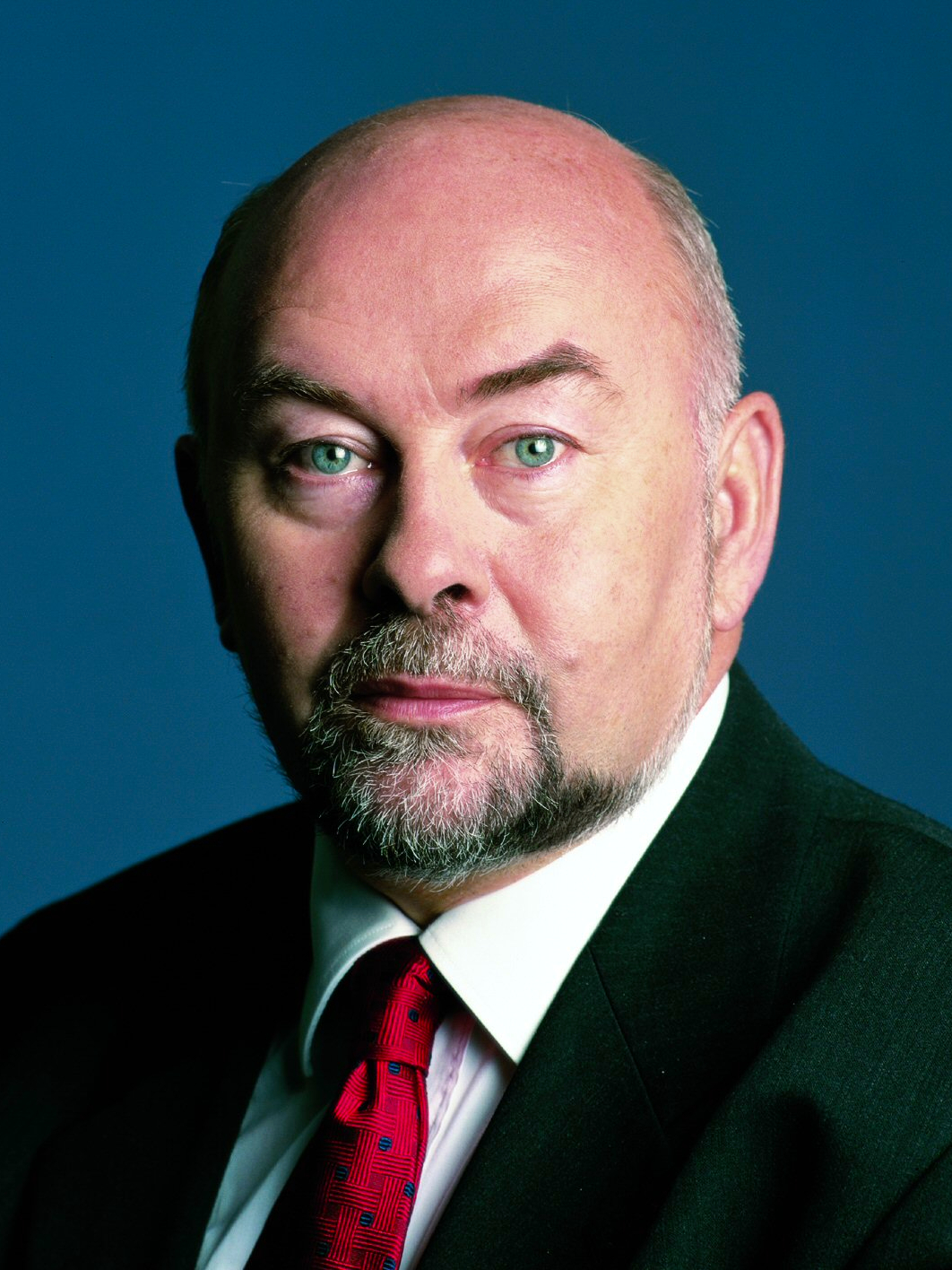

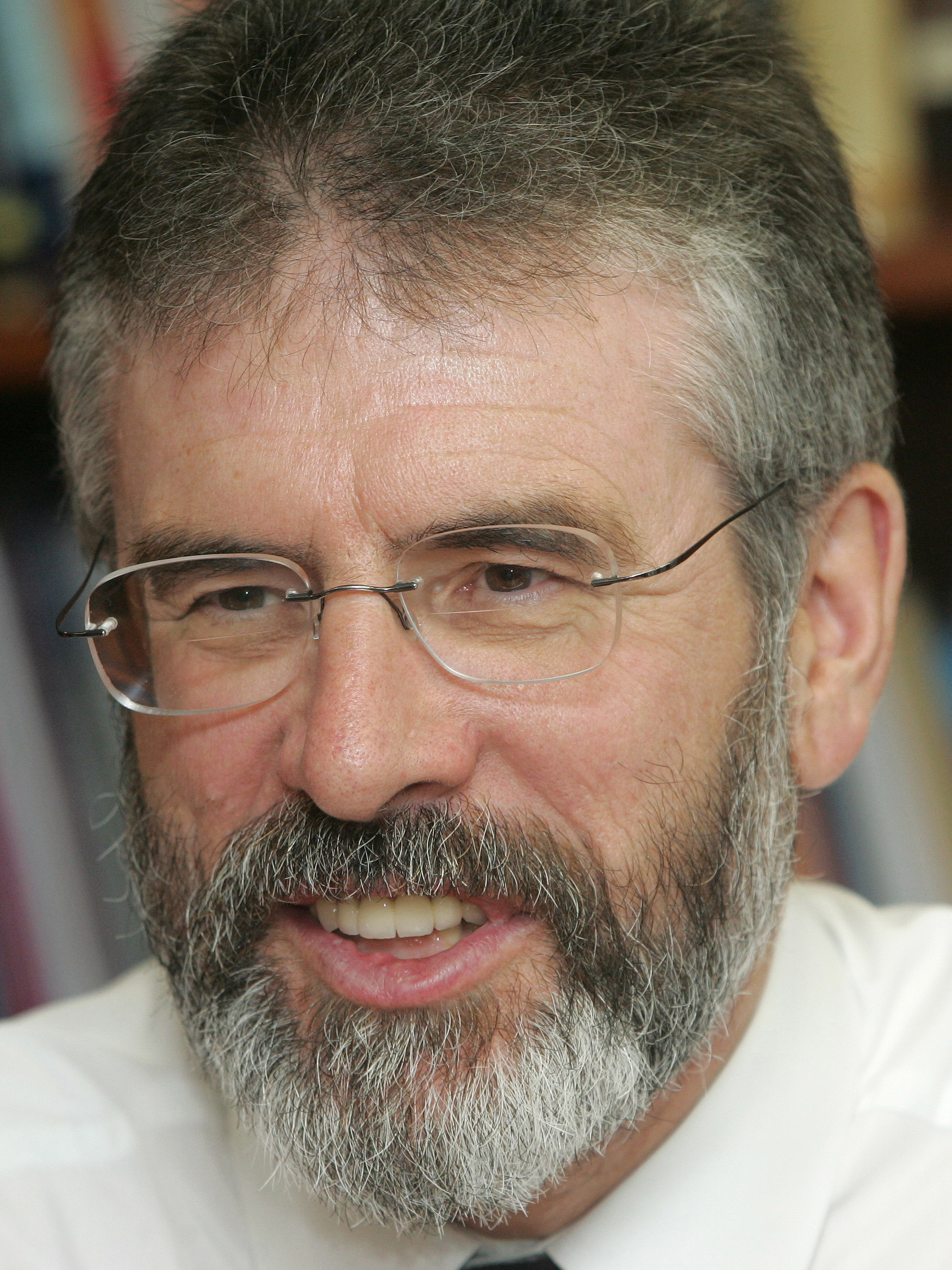
	First party	Second party	Third party
			Green
Leader	Bertie Ahern	John Bruton	None
Party	Fianna Fáil	Fine Gael	Green
Alliance	UEN	EPP–ED	Greens/EFA
Leader since	19 December 1994	20 November 1990	6 November 2001
Last election	35.0%, 7 seats	24.3%, 4 seats	7.9%, 2 seats
Seats won	6 / 15	4 / 15	2 / 15
Seat change	▼1	Steady	Steady
Popular vote	537,757	342,171	93,100
Percentage	38.6%	24.6%	6.7%
Swing	▲3.6 pp	▲0.4 pp	▼1.2 pp
	Fourth party	Fifth party	Sixth party
Leader	None (Note: Pictured here is Pat Cox, one of two successful Independent candidates in this election. Cox would become leader of the ELDR group in the European parliament between 1998 and 2002.)	Ruairi Quinn	Gerry Adams
Party	Independent	Labour	Sinn Féin
Alliance	ELDR & EPP-ED	PES
Leader since		13 November 1997	1983
Last election	1 seat	11.0%, 1 seat	3.0%, 0 seats
Seats won	2 / 15	1 / 15	0 / 53
Seat change	▲1	Steady	Steady
Popular vote	198,386	121,542	88,165
Percentage	14.3%	8.7%	6.3%
Swing	▲7.4 pp	▼2.3 pp	▲3.3 pp

The 1999 European Parliament election in Ireland was the Irish component of the 1999 European Parliament election. The election was conducted under the single transferable vote.

== Results ==
Party	Votes	%	+/–	Seats	+/–
Fianna Fáil	537,757	38.64	+3.6	6	−1
Fine Gael	342,171	24.59	+0.3	4	0
Labour Party	121,542	8.73	−2.3	1	0
Green Party	93,100	6.69	−1.2	2	0
Sinn Féin	88,165	6.33	+3.3	0	0
Socialist Party	10,619	0.76	New	0	New
Independent	198,386	14.25	+7.4	2	+1
Total	1,391,740	100.00	–	15	–
Valid votes	1,391,740	96.76			
Invalid/blank votes	46,547	3.24			
Total votes	1,438,287	100.00			
Registered voters/turnout	2,864,361	50.21			

=== MEPs elected ===
Constituency	Name	Party	EP group
Connacht–Ulster	Pat "the Cope" Gallagher	Fianna Fáil	UEN
Connacht–Ulster	Joe McCartin	Fine Gael	EPP–ED
Connacht–Ulster	Dana Rosemary Scallon	Independent	EPP–ED
Dublin	Mary Banotti	Fine Gael	EPP–ED
Dublin	Niall Andrews	Fianna Fáil	UEN
Dublin	Patricia McKenna	Green	Greens/EFA
Dublin	Proinsias De Rossa	Labour	PES
Leinster	Avril Doyle	Fine Gael	EPP–ED
Leinster	Jim Fitzsimons	Fianna Fáil	UEN
Leinster	Liam Hyland	Fianna Fáil	UEN
Leinster	Nuala Ahern	Green	Greens/EFA
Munster	Brian Crowley	Fianna Fáil	UEN
Munster	Gerry Collins	Fianna Fáil	UEN
Munster	Pat Cox	Independent	ELDR
Munster	John Cushnahan	Fine Gael	EPP–ED

=== Voting details ===
1979–2004 European Parliament Ireland constituencies

Constituency	Electorate	Turnout	Spoilt	Valid Poll	Quota	Seats	Candidates
Connacht–Ulster	541,552	332,236 (61.3%)	12,085 (3.6%)	320,151	80,038	3	11
Dublin	793,200	286,684 (36.1%)	6,013 (2.1%)	280,671	56,135	4	13
Leinster	706,200	357,064 (50.5%)	14,725 (4.1%)	342,339	68,468	4	8
Munster	823,008	462,303 (56.2%)	13,724 (2.9%)	448,579	89,716	4	10
Total	2,864,361	1,438,287 (50.2%)	46,547 (3.2%)	1,391,740	—	15	42

== See also ==
- List of members of the European Parliament for Ireland, 1999–2004 – List ordered by constituency
