= Leinster (European Parliament constituency) =

Former constituency of the European Parliament

- European Parliament constituency
- Shown within Ireland
- Member state: Ireland
- Created: 1979
- Dissolved: 2004
- MEPs: 3 (1979–1994); 4 (1994–2004)

Leinster was a European Parliament constituency in Ireland between 1979 and 2004. It elected three Members of the European Parliament (MEPs) in the 1979, 1984 and 1989 elections and four MEPs in the elections of 1994 and 1999 using the single transferable vote form of proportional representation (PR-STV).

== History and boundaries ==
The constituency was created in 1979 for the first direct elections to the European Parliament. It comprised the counties of Carlow, Kildare, Kilkenny, Laois, Longford, Louth, Meath, Offaly, Westmeath, Wexford and Wicklow from the historic province of Leinster excluding the County Dublin area. It was abolished under the European Parliament Elections (Amendment) Act 2004 and succeeded by the new East constituency.

== MEPs ==
Members of the European Parliament (MEPs) for Leinster 1979–2009
Key to parties: FF = Fianna Fáil; FG = Fine Gael; GP = Green; Lab = Labour
Parl.	Election	Member (Party)	Member (Party)	Member (Party)	Member (Party)
1st	1979	Mark Clinton (FG)	Patrick Lalor (FF)	Liam Kavanagh (Lab)	3 seats until 1994
1st	1981 (Note: Liam Kavanagh resigned on 7 July 1981 on his appointment as Minister for Labour and was substituted by Séamus Pattison (LAB / PES) on 9 July 1981.)	Mark Clinton (FG)	Patrick Lalor (FF)	Séamus Pattison (Lab)	3 seats until 1994
1st	1983 (Note: Séamus Pattison resigned on 15 December 1983 on his appointment as a Minister of State and was substituted by Justin Keating (LAB / PES) on 8 February 1984.)	Mark Clinton (FG)	Patrick Lalor (FF)	Justin Keating (Lab)	3 seats until 1994
2nd	1984	Mark Clinton (FG)	Patrick Lalor (FF)	Jim Fitzsimons (FF)	3 seats until 1994
3rd	1989	Patrick Cooney (FG)	Patrick Lalor (FF)	Jim Fitzsimons (FF)	3 seats until 1994
4th	1994	Alan Gillis (FG)	Liam Hyland (FF)	Jim Fitzsimons (FF)	Nuala Ahern (GP)
5th	1999	Avril Doyle (FG)	Liam Hyland (FF)	Jim Fitzsimons (FF)	Nuala Ahern (GP)
6th	2004	Constituency abolished. See East.			

Note: The columns in this table are used only for presentational purposes, and no significance should be attached to the order of columns. For details of the order in which seats were won at each election, see the detailed results of that election.

== Elections ==
*: Outgoing MEP elected at the previous election.
†: Outgoing MEP coopted subsequent to the previous election.

=== 1999 election ===
1999 European Parliament election: Leinster (4 seats)
Party	Candidate	FPv%	Count		
Party	Candidate	FPv%	1	2	3
Fine Gael	Avril Doyle	19.8	67,881	69,495	
Fianna Fáil	Jim Fitzsimons	17.2	58,750	61,439	66,117
Fianna Fáil	Liam Hyland	17.1	58,477	61,931	65,496
Fine Gael	Alan Gillis	14.2	48,729	50,040	56,881
Green	Nuala Ahern	13.8	47,184	52,618	66,808
Labour	Seán Butler	11.1	38,112	40,849	
Sinn Féin	Arthur Morgan	5.9	20,015		
Natural Law	Desmond Garrett	0.9	3,191		
Electorate: 706,200 Valid: 342,339 Spoilt: 14,725 (4.1%) Quota: 68,468 Turnout: 357,064 (50.6%)

=== 1994 election ===
1994 European Parliament election: Leinster (4 seats)
Party	Candidate	FPv%	Count						
Party	Candidate	FPv%	1	2	3	4	5	6	7
Fianna Fáil	Liam Hyland	17.7	46,448	46,737	47,255	48,238	49,236	51,543	54,161
Fine Gael	Alan Gillis	16.3	42,826	43,156	43,346	43,793	47,112	48,309	50,896
Fianna Fáil	Jim Fitzsimons	15.8	41,375	41,611	42,516	43,684	44,802	45,626	50,263
Green	Nuala Ahern	11.8	30,997	32,302	33,849	35,712	37,946	39,297	45,821
Fine Gael	Monica Barnes	11.4	29,958	30,235	30,448	30,949	33,692	35,070	39,518
Labour	Michael Bell	8.8	22,987	23,186	23,815	24,442	25,366	34,926	
Labour	Séamus Pattison	6.7	17,580	17,869	18,140	18,478	18,953		
Progressive Democrats	John Dardis	4.8	12,591	12,919	13,052	13,472			
Independent	Jack Fitzsimons	2.6	6,752	7,262	7,802				
Sinn Féin	Lucilita Bhreatnach	2.5	6,523	6,627					
Independent	Peter Sweetman	1.2	3,228						
Natural Law	Tom Mullins	0.5	1,180						
Electorate: 624,561 Valid: 262,445 Spoilt: 6,599 (2.5%) Quota: 52,490 Turnout: 269,044 (43.1%)

=== 1989 election ===
1989 European Parliament election: Leinster (3 seats)
Party	Candidate	FPv%	Count										
Party	Candidate	FPv%	1	2	3	4	5	6	7	8	9	10	11
Fianna Fáil	Patrick Lalor	20.0	75,627	75,715	75,856	76,198	76,370	76,914	78,753	81,555	85,090	88,868	90,473
Fine Gael	Patrick Cooney	17.4	65,775	65,926	65,962	66,430	66,504	66,733	67,963	71,289	82,701	112,060	
Fianna Fáil	Jim Fitzsimons	16.9	63,797	63,906	63,994	64,344	64,528	65,214	66,474	69,639	72,739	74,004	75,249
Labour	Michael Bell	13.2	49,766	49,870	49,954	50,298	50,537	51,104	55,754	61,606	65,668	68,015	75,239
Fine Gael	Charles McDonald	9.5	35,792	35,863	35,944	36,063	36,168	36,367	37,910	39,962	46,931		
Progressive Democrats	John Dardis	8.4	31,623	31,730	31,789	32,159	32,194	32,393	33,703	37,490			
Green	Seán English	6.3	23,724	23,922	23,992	24,309	24,401	25,162	27,199				
Workers' Party	Michael Enright	2.5	9,451	9,731	9,797	9,982	10,093	10,703					
Workers' Party	Catherine Murphy	1.9	7,089	7,125	7,321	7,413	7,684	8,155					
Sinn Féin	Kevin Dunphy	1.2	4,534	4,620	5,036	5,329	7,393						
Independent	Kevin Boland	0.9	3,362	3,462	3,496								
Sinn Féin	Pearse McGeough	0.8	3,001	3,009	3,863	3,930							
Sinn Féin	Terry Moore	0.6	2,424	2,438									
Independent	Cornelius de Groot	0.4	1,626										
Electorate: 571,694 Valid: 377,591 Spoilt: 14,106 (3.6%) Quota: 94,398 Turnout: 391,697 (68.5%)

Mark Clinton stepped down and was replaced by his party colleague Patrick Cooney.

=== 1984 election ===
1984 European Parliament election: Leinster (3 seats)
Party	Candidate	FPv%	Count			
Party	Candidate	FPv%	1	2	3	4
Fine Gael	Mark Clinton	23.8	61,669	63,159	92,091	
Fianna Fáil	Jim Fitzsimons	22.1	57,321	60,028	60,994	63,935
Fianna Fáil	Patrick Lalor	21.7	56,191	59,180	59,928	61,277
Fine Gael	Deirdre Bolger	12.8	33,208	34,570		
Labour	Justin Keating	11.9	30,773	35,308	37,756	53,552
Workers' Party	Liz McManus	3.5	8,943			
Sinn Féin	Martin Sharkey	1.8	4,548			
Sinn Féin	John Carroll	1.7	4,396			
Sinn Féin	James Dwyer	0.9	2,245			
Electorate: 545,878 Valid: 259,294 Spoilt: 9,197 (3.4%) Quota: 64,824 Turnout: 268,491 (49.2%)

=== 1979 election ===
1979 European Parliament election: Leinster (3 seats)
Party	Candidate	FPv%	Count				
Party	Candidate	FPv%	1	2	3	4	5
Fine Gael	Mark Clinton	25.7	78,762				
Fianna Fáil	Patrick Lalor	20.2	62,094	63,538	65,267	77,790	
Labour	Liam Kavanagh	13.1	40,072	43,704	47,801	49,187	58,576
Fianna Fáil	Tom Nolan	11.2	34,210	35,502	36,048	48,375	51,343
Fianna Fáil	Paddy Power	10.1	31,023	32,119	32,668		
Fine Gael	Charles McDonald	8.1	24,875	25,637	37,841	38,794	
Fine Gael	Monica Barnes	7.0	21,384	22,461			
Sinn Féin The Workers' Party	Donnchadha MacRaghnaill	2.7	8,414				
Sinn Féin The Workers' Party	Sean Walsh	2.0	6,062				
Electorate: 486,248 Valid: 306,896 Spoilt: 15,416 (4.8%) Quota: 76,725 Turnout: 322,312 (66.3%)
