= Jim Fitzsimons =

Irish former politician (born 1936)

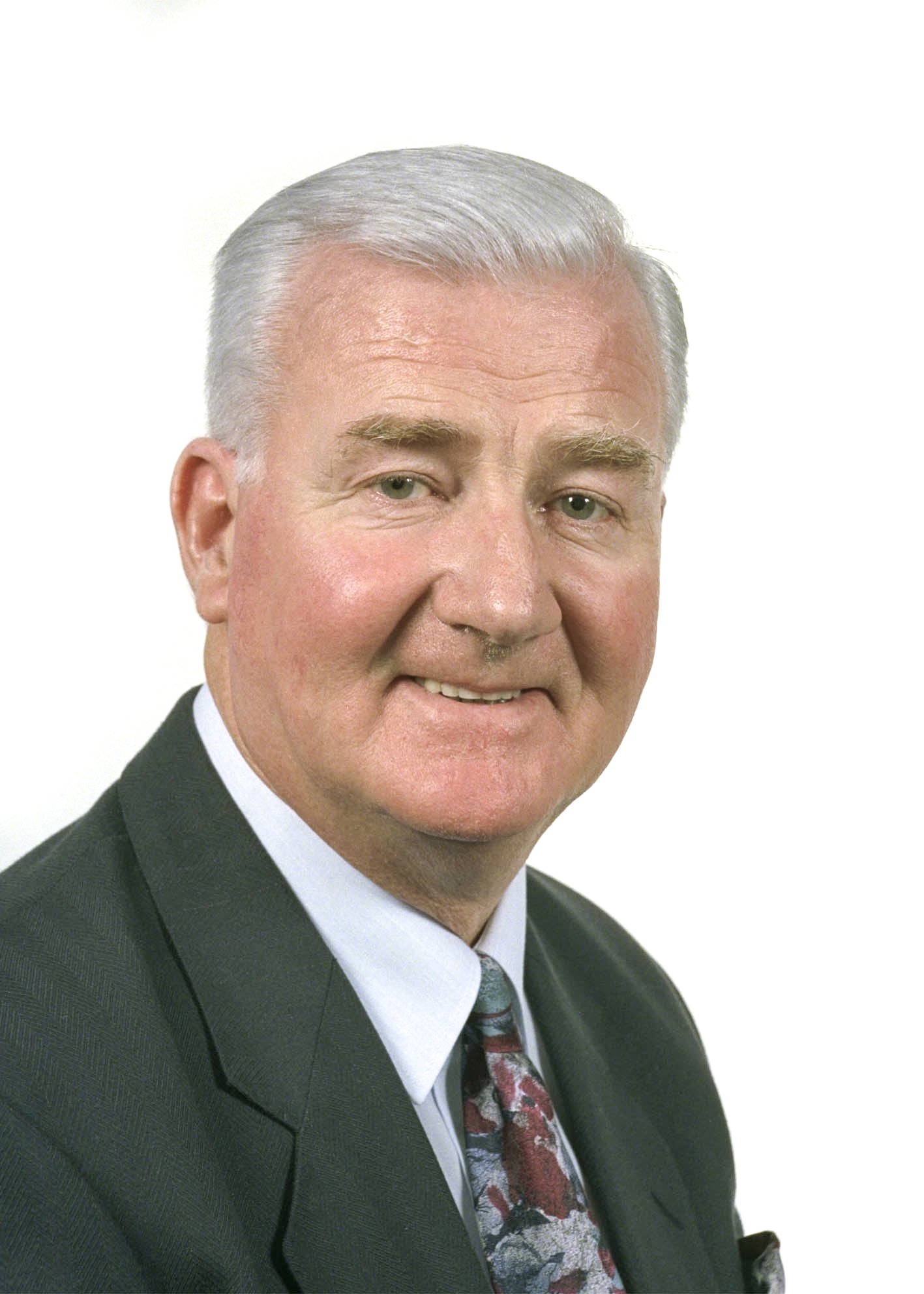
- Fitzsimons in 1994

Minister of State
- Oct.–Dec. 1982: Industry and Energy

Teachta Dála
- In office June 1977 – February 1987
- Constituency: Meath

Member of the European Parliament
- In office 1 July 1984 – 24 May 2004
- Constituency: Leinster

Personal details
- Born: 16 December 1936 (age 89) Navan, County Meath, Ireland
- Party: Fianna Fáil
- Education: St Patrick's Classical School

James Fitzsimons (born 16 December 1936) is an Irish former Fianna Fáil politician.

A publican from Navan, County Meath, he was educated at St Patrick's Classical School in Navan. Fitzsimons was elected to the 21st Dáil as a Fianna Fáil Teachta Dála (TD) for the Meath constituency on his first attempt at the 1977 general election, and re-elected until retiring at the 1987 general election to concentrate on his European Parliament seat. He was succeeded in the Dáil by Noel Dempsey.

He was appointed as Minister of State at the Department of Industry and Energy on 28 October 1982 by the short-lived 1982 Haughey Government in a reshuffle. The Dáil was dissolved on 4 November after the government lost a vote of confidence.

He was elected as an MEP at the 1984 European Parliament election and retained his seat for 20 years, until retiring at the 2004 European Parliament election.

Dáil	Election	Deputy (Party)	Deputy (Party)	Deputy (Party)
4th	1923	Patrick Mulvany (FP)	David Hall (Lab)	Eamonn Duggan (CnaG)
5th	1927 (Jun)	Matthew O'Reilly (FF)	David Hall (Lab)	Eamonn Duggan (CnaG)
6th	1927 (Sep)	Matthew O'Reilly (FF)	Arthur Matthews (CnaG)	Eamonn Duggan (CnaG)
7th	1932	James Kelly (FF)	Arthur Matthews (CnaG)	Eamonn Duggan (CnaG)
8th	1933	James Kelly (FF)	Robert Davitt (CnaG)	Matthew O'Reilly (FF)
9th	1937	Constituency abolished. See Meath–Westmeath		

Dáil	Election	Deputy (Party)	Deputy (Party)	Deputy (Party)	Deputy (Party)	Deputy (Party)
13th	1948	Matthew O'Reilly (FF)	Michael Hilliard (FF)	3 seats until 1977	Patrick Giles (FG)	3 seats until 1977
14th	1951	Matthew O'Reilly (FF)	Michael Hilliard (FF)	3 seats until 1977	Patrick Giles (FG)	3 seats until 1977
15th	1954	James Tully (Lab)	Michael Hilliard (FF)	3 seats until 1977	Patrick Giles (FG)	3 seats until 1977
16th	1957	James Griffin (FF)	Michael Hilliard (FF)	3 seats until 1977	Patrick Giles (FG)	3 seats until 1977
16th	1959 by-election	Henry Johnston (FF)	Michael Hilliard (FF)	3 seats until 1977	Patrick Giles (FG)	3 seats until 1977
17th	1961	James Tully (Lab)	Michael Hilliard (FF)	3 seats until 1977	Denis Farrelly (FG)	3 seats until 1977
18th	1965	James Tully (Lab)	Michael Hilliard (FF)	3 seats until 1977	Denis Farrelly (FG)	3 seats until 1977
19th	1969	James Tully (Lab)	Michael Hilliard (FF)	3 seats until 1977	John Bruton (FG)	3 seats until 1977
20th	1973	James Tully (Lab)	Brendan Crinion (FF)	3 seats until 1977	John Bruton (FG)	3 seats until 1977
21st	1977	James Tully (Lab)	Brendan Crinion (FF)	Jim Fitzsimons (FF)	John Bruton (FG)	4 seats 1977–1981
22nd	1981	James Tully (Lab)	Brendan Crinion (FF)	Jim Fitzsimons (FF)	John Bruton (FG)	John V. Farrelly (FG)
23rd	1982 (Feb)	Michael Lynch (FF)	Colm Hilliard (FF)	Jim Fitzsimons (FF)	John Bruton (FG)	John V. Farrelly (FG)
24th	1982 (Nov)	Frank McLoughlin (Lab)	Colm Hilliard (FF)	Jim Fitzsimons (FF)	John Bruton (FG)	John V. Farrelly (FG)
25th	1987	Michael Lynch (FF)	Colm Hilliard (FF)	Noel Dempsey (FF)	John Bruton (FG)	John V. Farrelly (FG)
26th	1989	Mary Wallace (FF)	Colm Hilliard (FF)	Noel Dempsey (FF)	John Bruton (FG)	John V. Farrelly (FG)
27th	1992	Mary Wallace (FF)	Colm Hilliard (FF)	Noel Dempsey (FF)	John Bruton (FG)	Brian Fitzgerald (Lab)
28th	1997	Mary Wallace (FF)	Johnny Brady (FF)	Noel Dempsey (FF)	John Bruton (FG)	John V. Farrelly (FG)
29th	2002	Mary Wallace (FF)	Johnny Brady (FF)	Noel Dempsey (FF)	John Bruton (FG)	Damien English (FG)
29th	2005 by-election	Mary Wallace (FF)	Johnny Brady (FF)	Noel Dempsey (FF)	Shane McEntee (FG)	Damien English (FG)
30th	2007	Constituency abolished. See Meath East and Meath West				
