= Proinsias De Rossa =

Irish politician (born 1940)

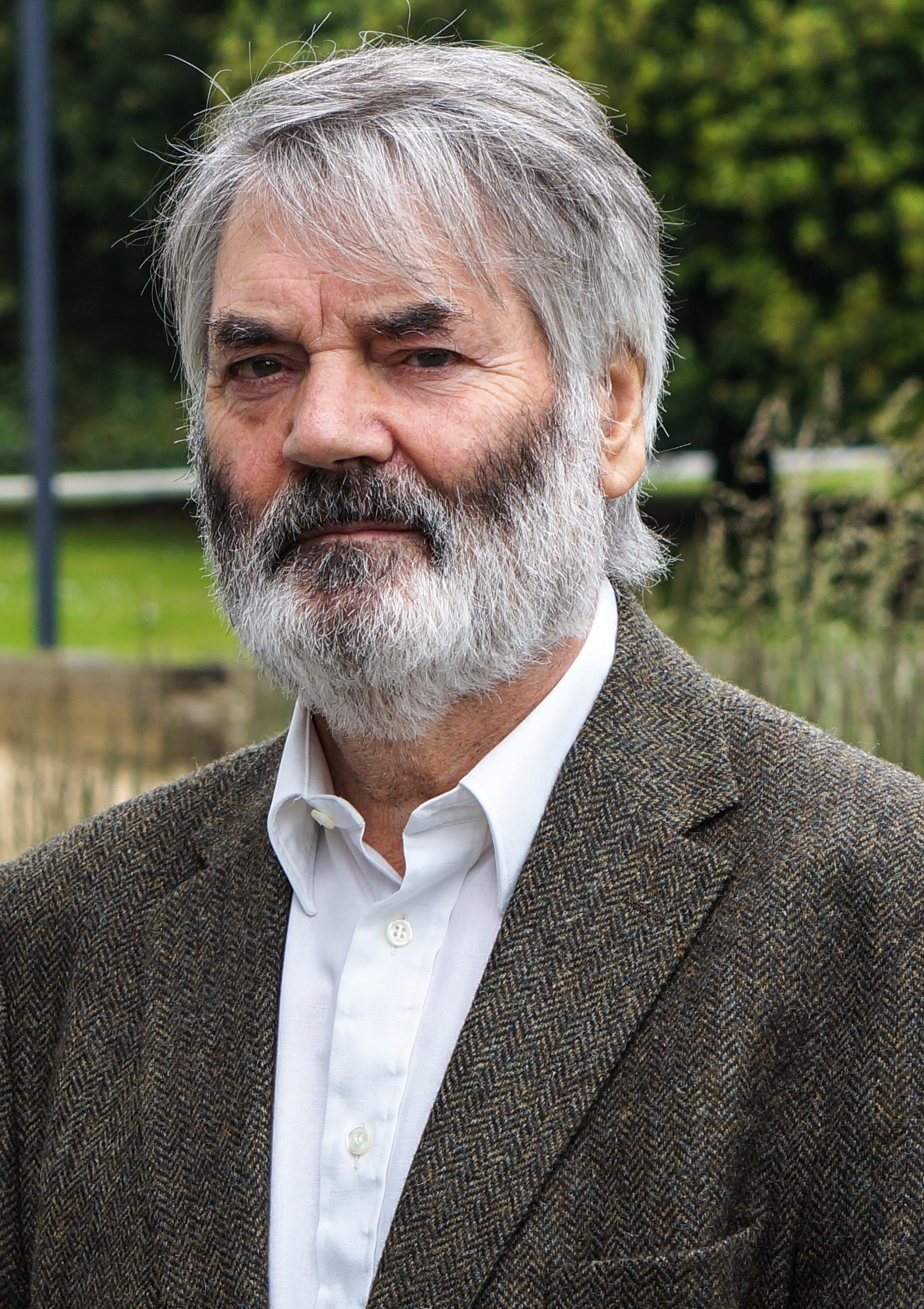
- De Rossa in 2014

Minister for Social Welfare
- In office 15 December 1994 – 26 June 1997
- Taoiseach: John Bruton
- Preceded by: Michael Woods
- Succeeded by: Dermot Ahern

Leader of Democratic Left
- In office 15 February 1992 – 11 July 1999
- Preceded by: New office
- Succeeded by: Office abolished

Leader of the Workers' Party
- In office 11 February 1988 – 8 February 1992
- Preceded by: Tomás Mac Giolla
- Succeeded by: Marian Donnelly

Member of the European Parliament
- In office 1 July 1999 – 22 February 2012
- In office 1 July 1989 – 30 November 1992
- Constituency: Dublin

Teachta Dála
- In office February 1982 – May 2002
- Constituency: Dublin North-West

Chair of the European Parliament Delegation for relations with Palestine
- In office 16 September 2009 – 1 February 2012
- Preceded by: Kyriacos Triantaphyllides
- Succeeded by: Martina Anderson

Personal details
- Born: Francis Ross; 15 May 1940 (age 86) Finglas, Dublin, Ireland
- Party: Labour Party (since 1999)
- Other political affiliations: Democratic Left (1992–1999); Workers' Party (1970–1992); Sinn Féin (until 1970)
- Education: Dublin Institute of Technology

Proinsias De Rossa (born 15 May 1940) is an Irish former Labour Party politician who served as Minister for Social Welfare from 1994 to 1997, leader of Democratic Left from 1992 to 1999 and leader of the Workers' Party from 1988 to 1992. He served as Member of the European Parliament (MEP) for the Dublin constituency from 1989 to 1992 and 1999 to 2012. He was a Teachta Dála (TD) for Dublin North-West from 1982 to 2002.

== Early life and political activity ==
Born as Francis Ross in 1940 in Dublin, he was educated at Marlborough Street National School and Dublin Institute of Technology. He joined Fianna Éireann at age 12.

In May 1956, soon after his sixteenth birthday, he joined the Irish Republican Army (IRA), and was politically active in Sinn Féin from an early age. During the IRA border campaign, he was arrested while training other IRA members in Glencree in May 1957. He served seven months in Mountjoy Prison and was then interned at the Curragh Camp.

== Political career ==
He took the Official Sinn Féin side in the 1970 split. In 1977, he contested his first general election for the party, which that year was renamed Sinn Féin The Workers' Party (in 1982 the name changed again to the Workers' Party).

He was successful on his third attempt, and was elected at the February 1982 general election as a Sinn Féin The Workers' Party TD for the Dublin North-West constituency. He retained his seat until the 2002 general election when he stood down in order to devote more time to his work in the European Parliament.

In 1988, De Rossa succeeded Tomás Mac Giolla as president of the Workers' Party. The party had been growing steadily in the 1980s, and had its best-ever electoral performance in the general and European elections held in 1989. The party won 7 Dáil seats with 5% of the vote. De Rossa himself was elected to the European Parliament for the Dublin constituency, where he topped the poll and the party almost succeeded in replacing Fine Gael as the capital's second-largest party. He sat as a member of the Group for the European United Left. However, the campaign resulted in a serious build-up of financial debt by the Workers' Party, which threatened to greatly inhibit the party's ability to ensure it would hold on to its gains.

Long-standing tensions within the Workers' Party, pitting reformers, including most of the party's TDs, against hard-liners centred on former general secretary Seán Garland, came to a head in 1992. Disagreements on policy issues were exacerbated by the desire of the reformers to ditch the democratic centralist nature of the party structures, and to remove any remaining questions about alleged party links with the Official IRA, a topic which had been the subject of persistent and embarrassing media coverage. De Rossa called a Special Ardfheis (party conference) to debate changes to the constitution. The motion failed to get the required two-thirds majority, and subsequently De Rossa led the majority of the parliamentary group and councillors out of a meeting of the party's Central Executive Committee the following Saturday at Wynn's Hotel, splitting the party.

De Rossa and the other former Workers' Party members then established a new political party, provisionally called New Agenda. At its founding conference in March 1992, it was named Democratic Left and De Rossa was elected party leader. Later that year he resigned his European Parliament seat, where he was succeeded by Democratic Left general secretary Des Geraghty.

Following the collapse of the Fianna Fáil–Labour Party coalition government in 1994, Fine Gael, Labour and Democratic Left negotiated a government programme for the remaining life of the 27th Dáil, which became known as the Rainbow Coalition. De Rossa became Minister for Social Welfare. He initiated Ireland's first national anti-poverty strategy, a commission on the family, and a commission to examine national pension policy.

Also under De Rossa, taxes on unemployment benefits were abolished, while the level of unemployment assistance for those living in the family home was increased substantially. A One Parent Family Allowance was also introduced, along with a Disability Allowance, Adoptive Benefit, Health and Safety Benefit and Survivor's Pension.

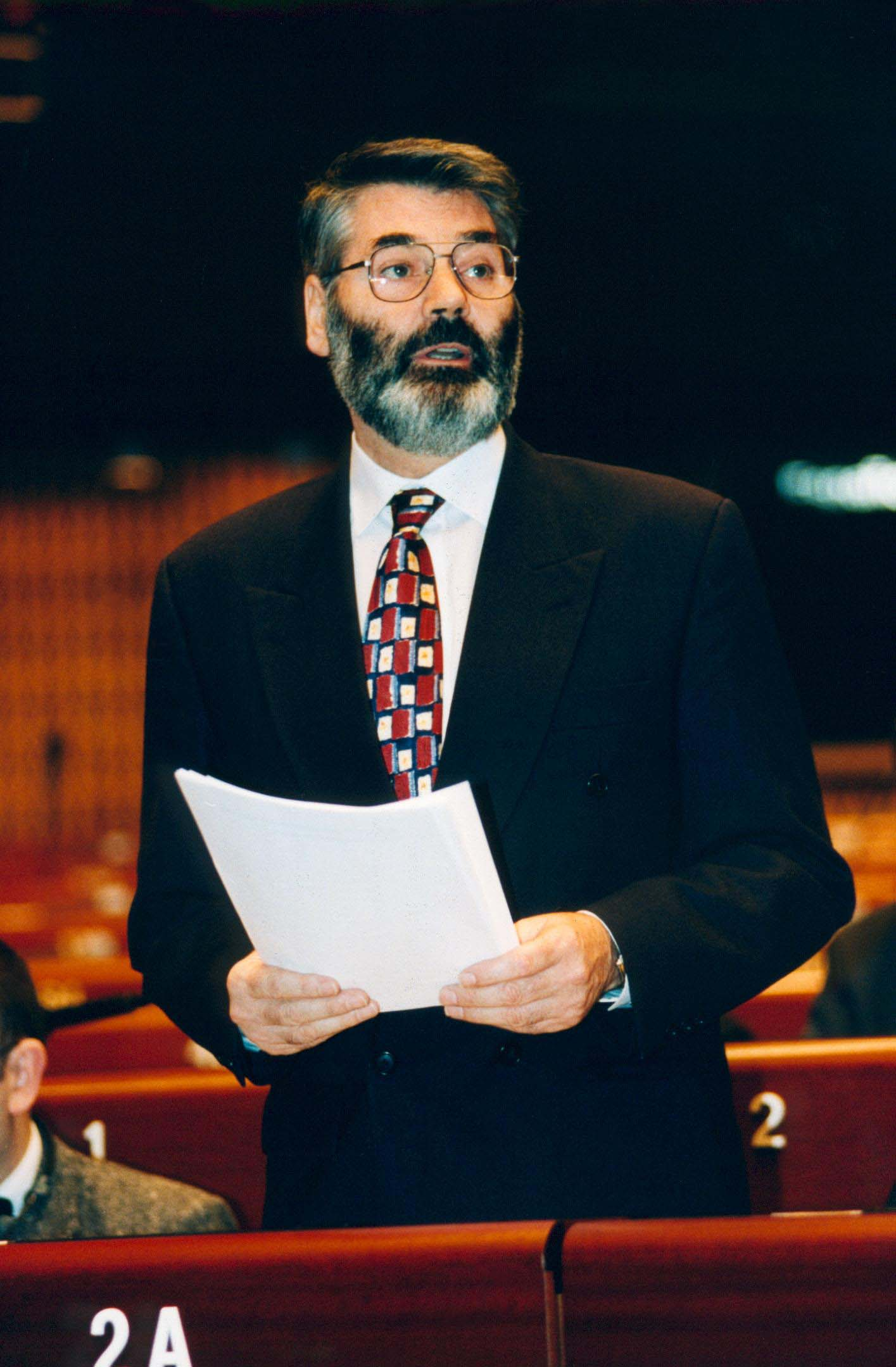
De Rossa speaking in the European Parliament in 1996

The 1997 general election resulted in the defeat of the outgoing coalition. At this point, Democratic Left had accumulated a very significant financial debt. In light of the co-operation achieved in practically all policy areas during the Rainbow Coalition, the party decided to merge with the Labour Party. Labour leader Ruairi Quinn continued as leader of the unified party; De Rossa took up the symbolic post of party president, which he held until 2002.

In 1999, De Rossa was elected again at the European Parliament election for the Dublin constituency, sitting on this occasion with the Group of the Party of European Socialists. De Rossa did not contest his Dáil seat at the 2002 general election. He was re-elected at the 2004 European Parliament election. As a member of the European Parliament, De Rossa took a strong pro-integration approach from a distinctly social democratic perspective, as well as a keen interest in foreign policy and social policy.

De Rossa was a member of the European Convention which produced the July 2003 draft European Constitution. De Rossa was chair of the European Parliament's delegation for relations with the Palestinian Legislative Council. He was a member of the Committee on Employment and Social Affairs and the Conference of Delegation Chairs, and a substitute member of the Committee on Development and the delegation to the Euro-Mediterranean Parliamentary Assembly. On 16 January 2012, he announced his decision to resign as an MEP, and stepped down on 1 February.

Elections to the Dáil
Party	Election		FPv	FPv%	Result
Sinn Féin The Workers' Party	Dublin Finglas	1977	1,317	4.8	Eliminated on count 3/8
Sinn Féin The Workers' Party	Dublin North-West	1981	2,071	6.4	Eliminated on count 8/11
Sinn Féin The Workers' Party	Dublin North-West	February 1982	3,906	12.4	Elected on count 9/9
Workers' Party	Dublin North-West	November 1982	6,291	19.8	Elected on count 4/10
Workers' Party	Dublin North-West	1987	6,866	19.8	Elected on count 5/13
Workers' Party	Dublin North-West	1989	7,976	26.7	Elected on count 1/9
Democratic Left	Dublin North-West	1992	4,562	12.2	Elected on count 12/12
Democratic Left	Dublin North-West	1997	3,701	10.1	Elected on count 10/10

Elections to the European Parliament
Party	Election		FPv	FPv%	Result
Workers' Party	Dublin	1989	71,041	15.8	Elected on count 6/6
Labour	Dublin	1999	28,748	10.2	Elected on count 8/8
Labour	Dublin	2004	54,344	12.9	Elected on count 6/6
Labour	Dublin	2009	83,471	20.5	Elected on count 6/7

== Libel action ==
During De Rossa's period as leader of Democratic Left, Irish journalist Eamon Dunphy, writing in the Sunday Independent newspaper, published an article alleging that De Rossa was aware, while a member of the Workers' Party, of the Official IRA's alleged illegal activities, including bank robberies and forgery. De Rossa sued the newspaper for libel and was awarded IR£300,000.

== Sources ==
- The Politics of Illusion: A Political History of the IRA, Henry Patterson, ISBN 1-897959-31-1
- The Workers' Party in Dáil Éireann: The First Ten Years, The Workers' Party, 1991
- Patterns of Betrayal: The Flight From Socialism, The Workers' Party, 1992

Political offices
Preceded by Michael Woods	Minister for Social Welfare; 1994–1997	Succeeded by Dermot Ahern as Minister for Social, Community and Family Affairs
Party political offices
Preceded by Tomás Mac Giolla	President of the Workers' Party; 1988–1992	Succeeded by Marian Donnelly
New political party	Leader of Democratic Left; 1992–1999	Succeeded by Merged with Labour Party

Dáil	Election	Deputy (Party)	Deputy (Party)	Deputy (Party)	Deputy (Party)
2nd	1921	Philip Cosgrave (SF)	Joseph McGrath (SF)	Richard Mulcahy (SF)	Michael Staines (SF)
3rd	1922	Philip Cosgrave (PT-SF)	Joseph McGrath (PT-SF)	Richard Mulcahy (PT-SF)	Michael Staines (PT-SF)
4th	1923	Constituency abolished. See Dublin North			

Dáil	Election	Deputy (Party)	Deputy (Party)	Deputy (Party)	Deputy (Party)	Deputy (Party)
9th	1937	Seán T. O'Kelly (FF)	A. P. Byrne (Ind.)	Cormac Breathnach (FF)	Patrick McGilligan (FG)	Archie Heron (Lab)
10th	1938	Seán T. O'Kelly (FF)	A. P. Byrne (Ind.)	Cormac Breathnach (FF)	Patrick McGilligan (FG)	Eamonn Cooney (FF)
11th	1943	Seán T. O'Kelly (FF)	A. P. Byrne (Ind.)	Cormac Breathnach (FF)	Patrick McGilligan (FG)	Martin O'Sullivan (Lab)
12th	1944	Seán T. O'Kelly (FF)	John S. O'Connor (FF)	Cormac Breathnach (FF)	Patrick McGilligan (FG)	Martin O'Sullivan (Lab)
12th	1945 by-election	Vivion de Valera (FF)	John S. O'Connor (FF)	Cormac Breathnach (FF)	Patrick McGilligan (FG)	Martin O'Sullivan (Lab)
13th	1948	Mick Fitzpatrick (CnaP)	A. P. Byrne (Ind.)	Cormac Breathnach (FF)	3 seats from 1948 to 1969	
14th	1951	Declan Costello (FG)	A. P. Byrne (Ind.)	Cormac Breathnach (FF)	3 seats from 1948 to 1969	
14th	1952 by-election	Declan Costello (FG)	Thomas Byrne (Ind.)	Cormac Breathnach (FF)	3 seats from 1948 to 1969	
15th	1954	Declan Costello (FG)	Thomas Byrne (Ind.)	Richard Gogan (FF)	3 seats from 1948 to 1969	
16th	1957	Declan Costello (FG)	Thomas Byrne (Ind.)	Richard Gogan (FF)	3 seats from 1948 to 1969	
17th	1961	Declan Costello (FG)	Michael Mullen (Lab)	Richard Gogan (FF)	3 seats from 1948 to 1969	
18th	1965	Declan Costello (FG)	Michael Mullen (Lab)	Richard Gogan (FF)	3 seats from 1948 to 1969	
19th	1969	Hugh Byrne (FG)	Jim Tunney (FF)	Richard Gogan (FF)	David Thornley (Lab)	4 seats from 1969 to 1977
20th	1973	Hugh Byrne (FG)	Jim Tunney (FF)	Richard Gogan (FF)	David Thornley (Lab)	4 seats from 1969 to 1977
21st	1977	Constituency abolished. See Dublin Finglas and Dublin Cabra				

Dáil	Election	Deputy (Party)	Deputy (Party)	Deputy (Party)	Deputy (Party)
22nd	1981	Jim Tunney (FF)	Michael Barrett (FF)	Mary Flaherty (FG)	Hugh Byrne (FG)
23rd	1982 (Feb)	Jim Tunney (FF)	Michael Barrett (FF)	Mary Flaherty (FG)	Proinsias De Rossa (WP)
24th	1982 (Nov)	Jim Tunney (FF)	Michael Barrett (FF)	Mary Flaherty (FG)	Proinsias De Rossa (WP)
25th	1987	Jim Tunney (FF)	Michael Barrett (FF)	Mary Flaherty (FG)	Proinsias De Rossa (WP)
26th	1989	Jim Tunney (FF)	Michael Barrett (FF)	Mary Flaherty (FG)	Proinsias De Rossa (WP)
27th	1992	Noel Ahern (FF)	Róisín Shortall (Lab)	Mary Flaherty (FG)	Proinsias De Rossa (DL)
28th	1997	Noel Ahern (FF)	Róisín Shortall (Lab)	Pat Carey (FF)	Proinsias De Rossa (DL)
29th	2002	Noel Ahern (FF)	Róisín Shortall (Lab)	Pat Carey (FF)	3 seats from 2002
30th	2007	Noel Ahern (FF)	Róisín Shortall (Lab)	Pat Carey (FF)	3 seats from 2002
31st	2011	Dessie Ellis (SF)	Róisín Shortall (Lab)	John Lyons (Lab)	3 seats from 2002
32nd	2016	Dessie Ellis (SF)	Róisín Shortall (SD)	Noel Rock (FG)	3 seats from 2002
33rd	2020	Dessie Ellis (SF)	Róisín Shortall (SD)	Paul McAuliffe (FF)	3 seats from 2002
34th	2024	Dessie Ellis (SF)	Rory Hearne (SD)	Paul McAuliffe (FF)	3 seats from 2002
