= Nuala Ahern =

Irish former politician (born 1949)

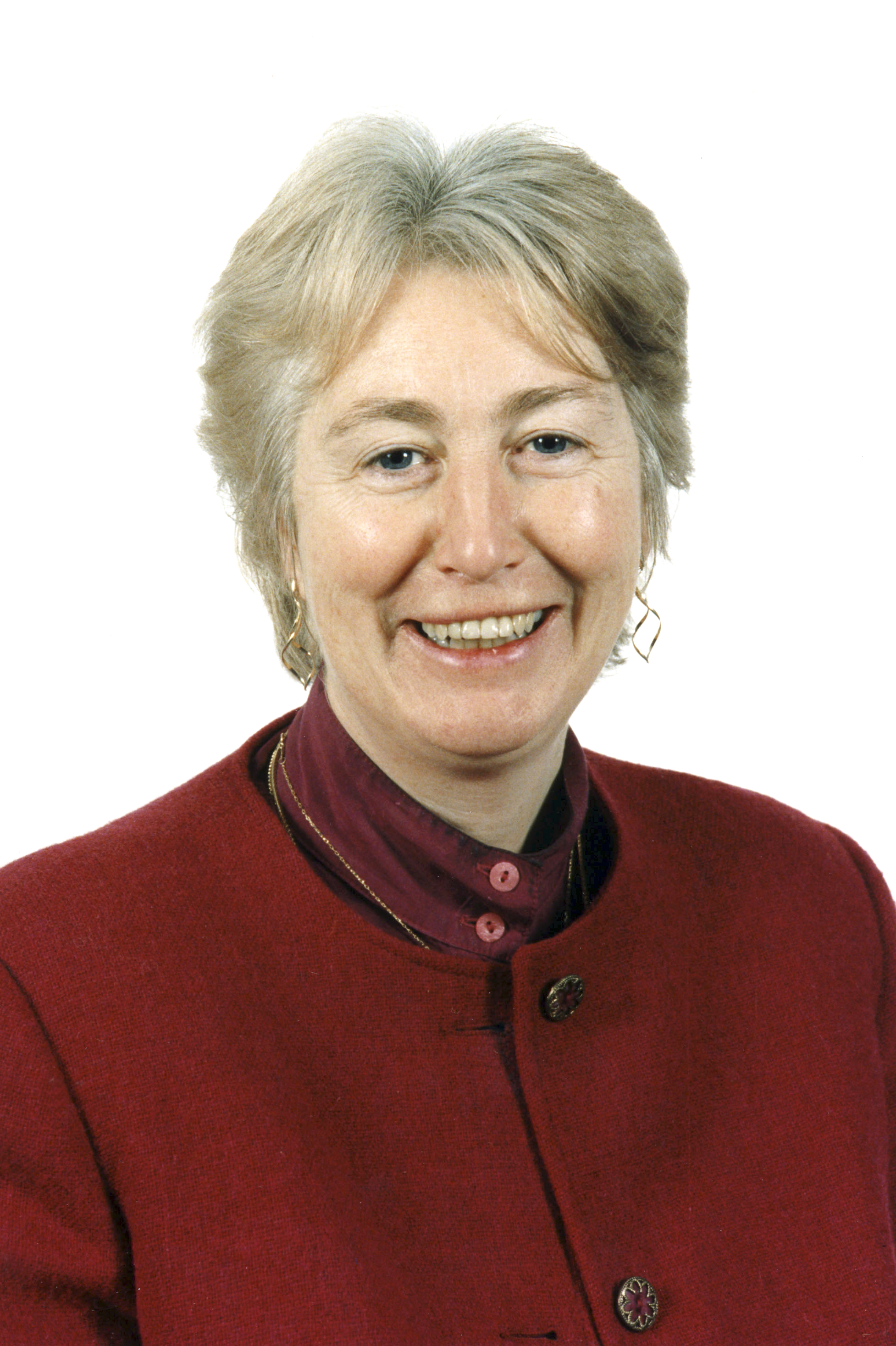
- Ahern, c. 1994

Member of the European Parliament
- In office June 1994 – June 2004
- Constituency: Leinster

Personal details
- Born: 5 February 1949 (age 77) Belfast, Northern Ireland
- Party: Green Party

Nuala Ahern (née MacDowell; born 5 February 1949) is an Irish former Green Party member of the European Parliament representing Leinster in Ireland from 1994 to 2004. Ahern became active in politics in 1991 becoming elected to Wicklow County Council. She joined the Green Party in 1989.

Her involvement in politics began through community action in Wicklow to prevent sewage pollution into the Irish Sea. She is a long-term anti-nuclear campaigner, promoting the use of renewable energy. She grew up in the Cooley peninsula of North County Louth which is close to the plutonium reprocessing plant in Sellafield on the West coast of the UK. She campaigned against the construction of a nuclear power plant in Carnsore Point, County Wexford in the late 1970s and for the closure of Sellafield which still operates today. She campaigned against the use of genetically modified food stating concerns of inadequate scientific knowledge. She has also campaigned against animal testing in the European Union.

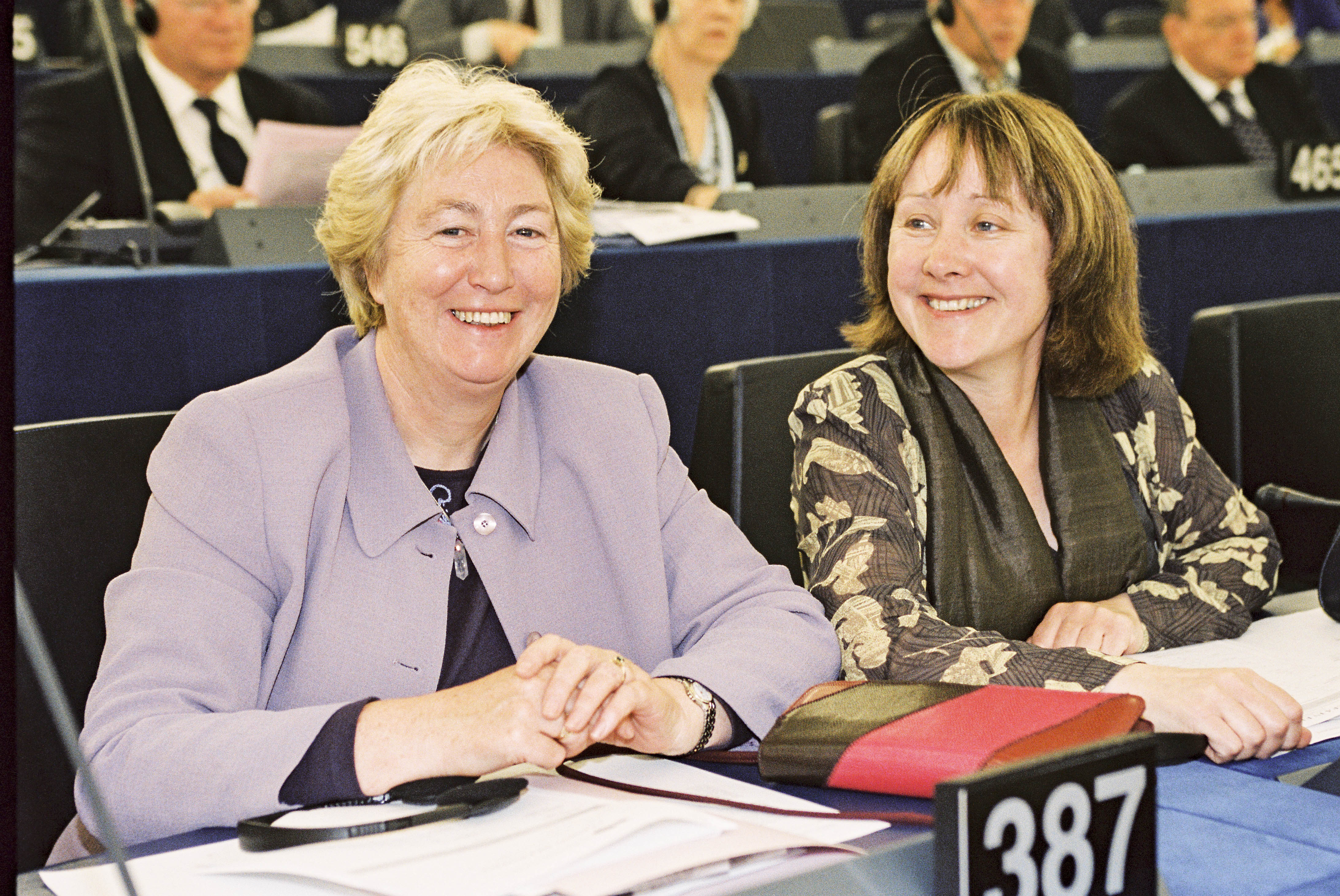
Ahern alongside fellow MEP and Green Party member Patricia McKenna in 2003.

In the European Parliament Ahern was vice-president of the Petitions Committee, vice-president of the Committee on Industry, External Trade, Research & Energy, member of the Culture Committee and Legal Affairs Committee and president of the Intergroup on Complementary and Natural Medicine.

Ahern is founding member of the Irish Women's Environment Network and the Wicklow Greens.

Her father Vincent MacDowell from Newry, was a councillor and political activist, a vice chairperson of Northern Ireland Civil Rights Association and a representative of the Green Party and the Labour Party.
