= Patricia McKenna =

Irish former politician (born 1957)

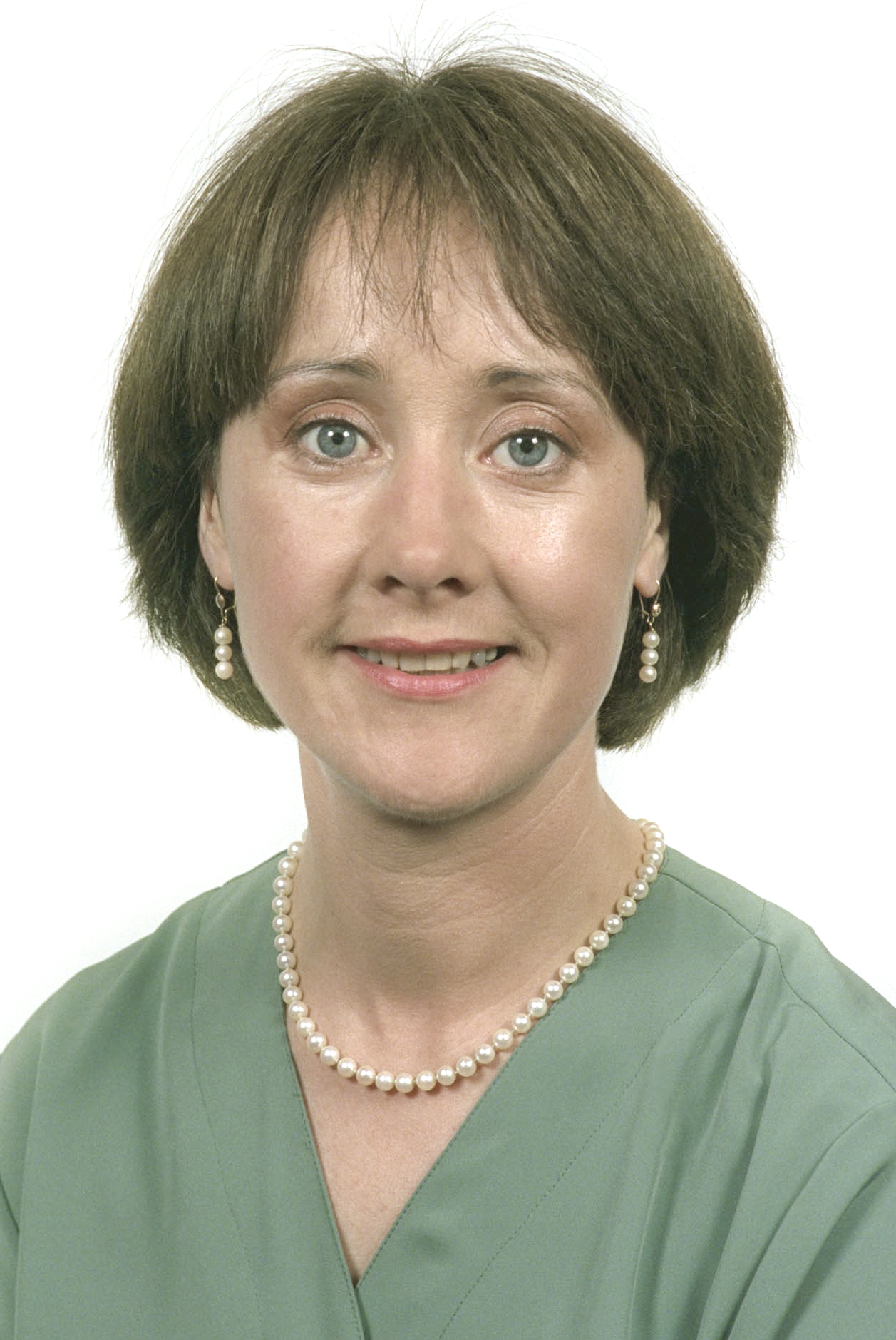
- McKenna in 1994

Member of the European Parliament
- In office 1 July 1994 – 20 May 2004
- Constituency: Dublin

Personal details
- Born: Patricia Mary Margaret McKenna; 13 March 1957 (age 69) Castleshane, County Monaghan, Ireland
- Party: Independent
- Other political affiliations: Green Party (until 2009)
- Spouse: Martin Gillen (m. 1995)
- Children: 3
- Education: Limerick School of Art and Design; National College of Art and Design; Trinity College Dublin; King's Inns

Patricia McKenna (born 13 March 1957) is an Irish independent and former Green Party politician. She served as a Member of the European Parliament (MEP) for the Dublin constituency from 1994 to 2004. She is a practising barrister having been called to the Bar in 2016.

== Background ==
A native of Castleshane, a small village in County Monaghan. She attended St Louis' Convent, Monaghan, starting in 1969. She wanted to study art and attended Letterkenny RTC, the Limerick School of Art and Design and also the National College of Art and Design in Dublin. She spent some time teaching art and had a studio in Temple Bar. She became involved in politics while at college.

McKenna was formerly a member of the Green Party. She became the first Green Party candidate in Ireland to be elected to the European Parliament. She was elected to the European Parliament at the 1994 election and was re-elected at the 1999 election, but lost her seat at the 2004 election. She acted as one of the Dáil advisers to Ireland's first Green Party Teachta Dála (TD), Roger Garland. In 1997, she called for a boycott of Dunnes Stores when it was reported to be selling clothes produced in a state-run factory in Myanmar.

She is active in the People's Movement, which opposes further European Union integration and campaigned for the rejection of the Treaty of Lisbon in 2008.

McKenna has been involved in many campaigns as an MEP and politician. She is known for her victory in the Supreme Court in 1995, in which she argued successfully that it was unconstitutional for the Government of Ireland to spend taxpayers money promoting only one side of the argument in referendum campaigns. This led to the setting up of the Referendum Commission.

She is also well known for her opposition to nuclear power, genetically modified food, and United States-led military action in various parts of the world. She has also expressed concerns about the safety of the MMR vaccine.

McKenna ran as Green Party candidate at the 2007 general election for the Dublin Central constituency, but was not elected. She also strongly opposed the 2007 Programme for Government between the Green Party and Fianna Fáil. After the election, she declared herself a candidate for the leadership of the Green Party, but the position was won by John Gormley. She was elected to the Green Party National Executive in April 2008.

In August 2008, she appeared in RTÉ's reality show Fáilte Towers. She was the fourth contestant evicted from the show.

She subsequently graduated with a degree in Law and Political Science from Trinity College Dublin. She was called to the Bar in 2016.

== 2009 European Parliament election ==
In May 2009, after the bank bail-outs, McKenna announced her intention to run as an Independent candidate at the 2009 European Parliament election in Dublin - attacking her party colleagues as "nothing but hypocrites" due to their role in the coalition government, and that she would be "embarrassed to stand as their candidate".

Reactions by former party colleagues to McKenna's departure from the Green Party were mixed. According to Green Party Senator Déirdre de Búrca, "The pity about Patricia McKenna's move is that she did not do it at least a year ago and spare herself and her party colleagues a lot of time-wasting and strife. It has been increasingly clear that she does not share the same views on many issues with Green Party members."

McKenna was not elected at the 2009 European Parliament election. She received 17,521 first preference votes (4.3%). She was eliminated at the fifth count, after her former party colleague Déirdre de Búrca, who was eliminated at the third count.

In June 2010, she attended meetings with a number of former Green Party members to facilitate the formation of a new political party, Fís Nua.

== Involvement in the 2016 Brexit referendum ==
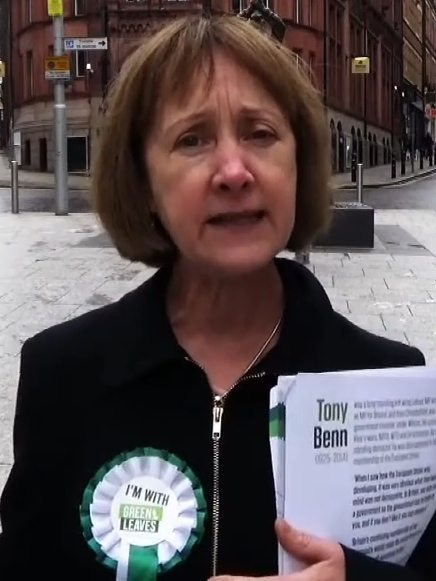
McKenna in 2016

In 2016, McKenna campaigned with Green Leaves, an EU critical faction of the Green Party of England and Wales whose members include Baroness Jenny Jones, for the United Kingdom to leave the European Union in the run up to its membership referendum. She argued that the EU is unreformable and criticised its neoliberal policies.

== Seanad by-election ==
She was an unsuccessful candidate in the 2022 Dublin University by-election, having been eliminated on the seventh count with 463 votes (3.5%).
