= List of members of the European Parliament for Ireland, 2004–2009 =

This is a list of the 13 members of the European Parliament for Ireland elected at the 2004 European Parliament election. They served in the 2004 to 2009 session.

== List ==
| Name | Constituency | National party | EP group |
|---|---|---|---|
| Liam Aylward | East | Fianna Fáil | UEN |
| Simon Coveney† | South | Fine Gael | EPP–ED |
| Brian Crowley | South | Fianna Fáil | UEN |
| Proinsias De Rossa | Dublin | Labour | PES |
| Avril Doyle | East | Fine Gael | EPP–ED |
| Marian Harkin | North-West | Independent | ALDE |
| Jim Higgins | North-West | Fine Gael | EPP–ED |
| Mary Lou McDonald | Dublin | Sinn Féin | GUE/NGL |
| Mairead McGuinness | East | Fine Gael | EPP–ED |
| Gay Mitchell | Dublin | Fine Gael | EPP–ED |
| Seán Ó Neachtain | North-West | Fianna Fáil | UEN |
| Eoin Ryan | Dublin | Fianna Fáil | UEN |
| Kathy Sinnott | South | Independent | IND/DEM |

^{†}Replaced during term, see table below for details.

== Changes ==
| Party | Outgoing | Constituency | Reason | Date | Replacement |
|---|---|---|---|---|---|
| Fine Gael | Simon Coveney | Dublin | Coveney elected to Dáil Éireann at the 2007 general election | 19 June 2007 | Colm Burke |

== See also ==
- Members of the European Parliament (2004–2009) – List by country
- List of members of the European Parliament (2004–2009) – Full alphabetical list
