= List of members of the European Parliament for Ireland, 2009–2014 =

This is a list of the 12 members of the European Parliament for Ireland elected at the 2009 European Parliament election. They served in the 2009 to 2014 session.

== List ==
Name	Constituency	National party	EP group
Liam Aylward	East	Fianna Fáil	ALDE
Nessa Childers	East	Labour	S&D
Brian Crowley	South	Fianna Fáil	ALDE
Proinsias De Rossa†	Dublin	Labour	S&D
Pat "the Cope" Gallagher	North-West	Fianna Fáil	ALDE
Marian Harkin	North-West	Independent	ALDE
Jim Higgins	North-West	Fine Gael	EPP
Joe Higgins†	Dublin	Socialist Party	GUE/NGL
Alan Kelly†	South	Labour	S&D
Seán Kelly	South	Fine Gael	EPP
Mairead McGuinness	East	Fine Gael	EPP
Gay Mitchell	Dublin	Fine Gael	EPP

^{†}Replaced during term, see table below for details.

== Changes ==
Party	Outgoing	Constituency	Reason	Date	Replacement
Labour	Proinsias De Rossa	Dublin	Resignation of De Rossa in January 2012	February 2012	Emer Costello
Socialist Party	Joe Higgins	Dublin	Higgins elected to Dáil Éireann at the 2011 general election	April 2011	Paul Murphy
Labour	Alan Kelly	South	Kelly elected to Dáil Éireann at the 2011 general election	April 2011	Phil Prendergast

== See also ==
- Members of the European Parliament (2009–2014) – List by country
- List of members of the European Parliament (2009–2014) – Full alphabetical list
