= Members of the European Parliament (2004–2009) =

This is a list giving breakdowns of the members serving in the European Parliamentary session from 2004 to 2009, following the 2004 election. For a full single list, see: List of members of the European Parliament 2004–2009.

== MEPs ==
- MEPs for Austria 2004–2009
- MEPs for Belgium 2004–2009
- MEPs for Bulgaria 2007–2009
  - MEPs for Bulgaria 2007 (delegation)
- MEPs for Cyprus 2004–2009
- MEPs for the Czech Republic 2004–2009
- MEPs for Denmark 2004–2009
- MEPs for Estonia 2004–2009
- MEPs for Finland 2004–2009
- MEPs for France 2004–2009
- MEPs for Germany 2004–2009
- MEPs for Greece 2004–2009
- MEPs for Hungary 2004–2009
- MEPs for Ireland 2004–2009
- MEPs for Italy 2004–2009
- MEPs for Latvia 2004–2009
- MEPs for Lithuania 2004–2009
- MEPs for Luxembourg 2004–2009
- MEPs for Malta 2004–2009
- List of members of the European Parliament for the Netherlands, 2004–2009
- MEPs for Poland 2004–2009
- MEPs for Portugal 2004–2009
- MEPs for Romania 2007–2009
  - MEPs for Romania 2007 (delegation)
- MEPs for Slovakia 2004–2009
- MEPs for Slovenia 2004–2009
- MEPs for Spain 2004–2009
- MEPs for Sweden 2004–2009
- MEPs for the United Kingdom 2004–2009

== Observers ==
- Observers for Bulgaria 2005–2006
- Observers for Romania 2005–2006
