= Paschal Mooney =

Irish former politician (born 1947)

Senator
- In office 19 January 2010 – 8 June 2016
- Constituency: Agricultural Panel
- In office 25 April 1987 – 13 September 2007
- Constituency: Cultural and Educational Panel

Personal details
- Born: 14 October 1947 (age 78) Dublin, Ireland
- Party: Fianna Fáil
- Spouse: Sheila Baldrey
- Children: 5
- Parent: Joe Mooney (father)

Paschal Canice Mooney (born 14 October 1947) is an Irish Fianna Fáil politician and a former member of Seanad Éireann.

A journalist and broadcaster, he was first elected to the Seanad in 1987, on the Cultural and Educational Panel. He retained his seat at each subsequent election until losing it at the 2007 election to the 23rd Seanad. He was re-elected to Seanad Éireann on the Agricultural Panel in a Seanad by-election on 19 January 2010., re-elected in 2011, but lost his seat in the April 2016 election.

== Early and personal life ==
Born in Dublin, he grew up in Drumshanbo, County Leitrim. His father, Joe, was a member of the Seanad (1961–1965) and Leitrim County Council (1943–1988) while his mother Eva Mooney also served as a member of Leitrim County Council (1988–1991). He is the third generation of his family to contribute to public service locally and nationally as his grandfather, Andrew Mooney, served as a member of Leitrim County Council from 1920 to 1943.

Mooney has also enjoyed a broadcasting career with RTÉ, Ireland's national broadcaster. A presenter of a variety of Irish traditional and country music and Sports programmes, he devised, scripted and presented numerous music documentaries on Irish and American country music stars. He was in the forefront of the 'Shot at Dawn' campaign led in the British House of Commons by Andrew MacKinlay MP and in the House of Lords by Alf Dubs seeking a pardon for over 300 soldiers of World War I (including 26 Irish servicemen) shot in questionable circumstances following Field courts-martial.

Mooney married Sheila Baldrey; and the couple have five children.

== Political career ==
He was first elected to the Seanad in 1987, on the Cultural and Educational Panel as a nominee of the Library Association of Ireland (LAI). He retained his seat at each subsequent election until losing it in the 2007 election. He was a member of Leitrim County Council from 1991 to 1999. He later served as a delegate to the Parliamentary Assembly of the Western European Union 1998 to 2002, and subsequently was a member of the Irish Delegation to the Parliamentary Assembly of the Council of Europe 2002–2008. He was appointed a member of the British–Irish Parliamentary Assembly (BIPA) in 1997 and served until 2007. Mooney returned to the BIPA in 2011 and also sits on the North/South Parliamentary Body which meets twice yearly in Belfast and Dublin and is the representative of the Stormont Assembly and Oireachtas. In April 2008, Mooney was nominated to the position of chairman of Fáilte Ireland North West, one of five Regional Tourism Boards in Ireland charged with promoting their regions and attracting tourists.

Mooney was selected as running mate to Seán Ó Neachtain as a Fianna Fáil candidate at the 2009 European Parliament election for the North-West constituency. Following the announcement by Ó Neachtain that he was not contesting the election for health reasons, Pat "the Cope" Gallagher was nominated to contest the constituency as Mooney's Fianna Fáil running mate. Gallagher was elected as an MEP but Mooney was unsuccessful. On 19 January 2010, Mooney was elected on the first count in a Seanad by-election caused by the death of Senator Peter Callanan in October 2009. As a result, he took a seat on the Agricultural Panel in the 23rd Seanad returning after an absence of two and a half years. He was re-elected at the 2011 Seanad election. He was the Fianna Fáil Seanad spokesperson on Social Protection. He was also a member of the Joint Oireachtas Committee on Agricultural and the Joint Committee on Transport, Energy and Communications.

== See also ==
- Families in the Oireachtas
