= 2014 Irish elections =

2014 Irish elections may refer to:

== Republic of Ireland ==
- 2014 Irish local elections
- 2014 European Parliament election in Ireland

== Northern Ireland ==
- 2014 Northern Ireland local elections
