= 2004 European Parliament election in Ireland =

- 11 June 2004

13 seats to the European Parliament
- Turnout: 1,841,335 (59.0% ▲8.8 pp)
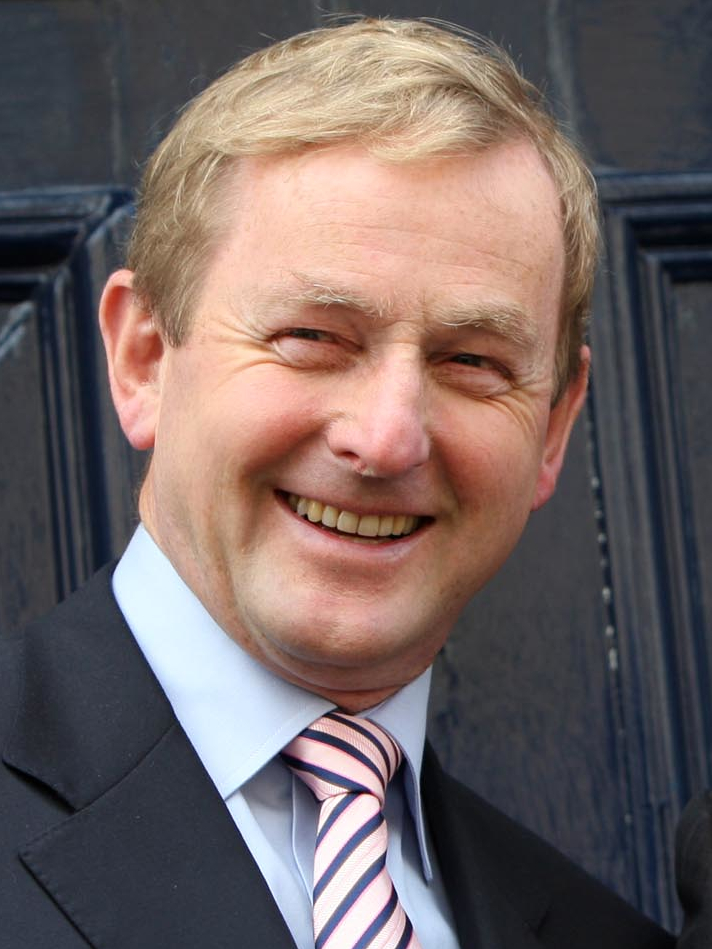

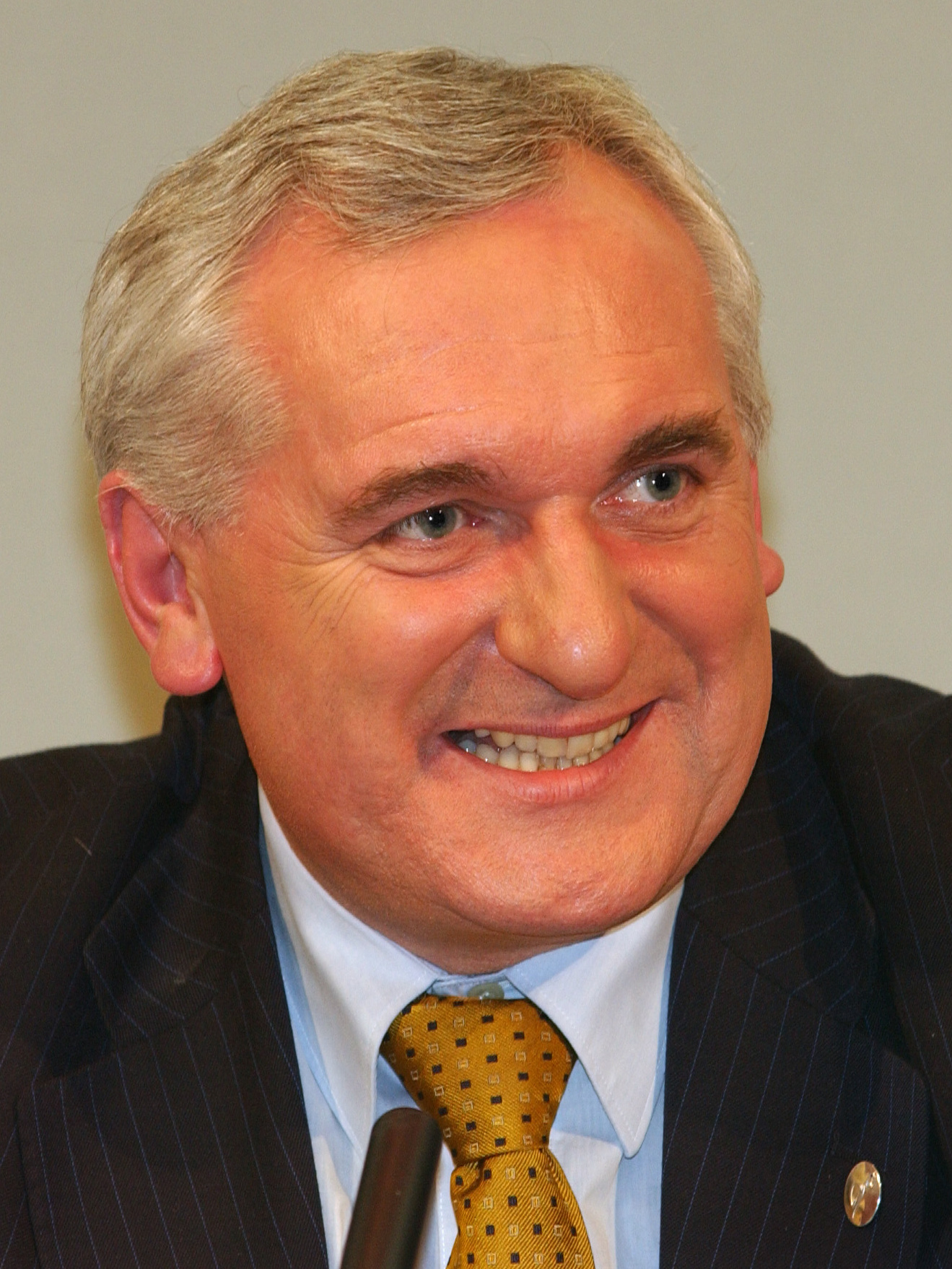

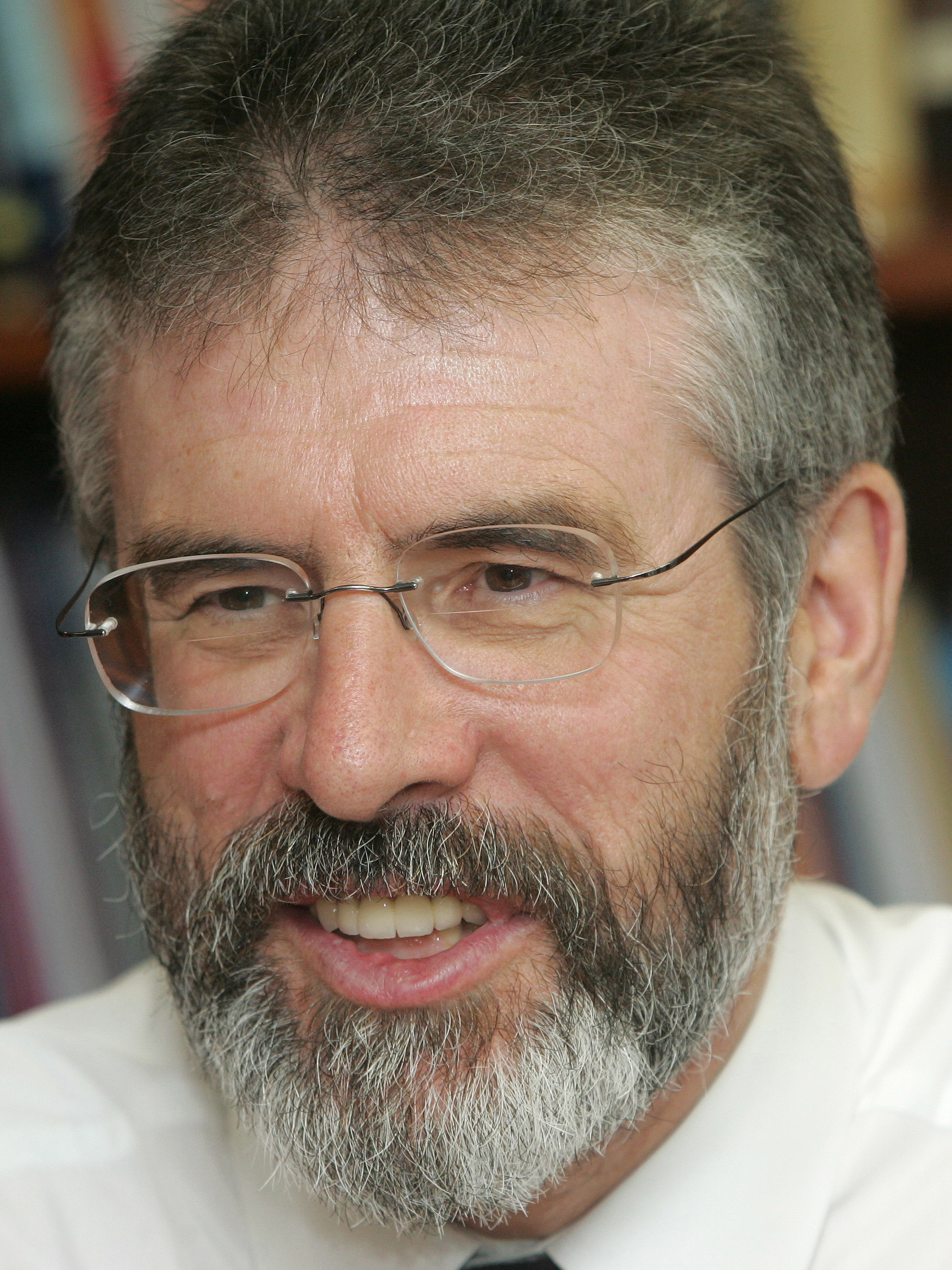

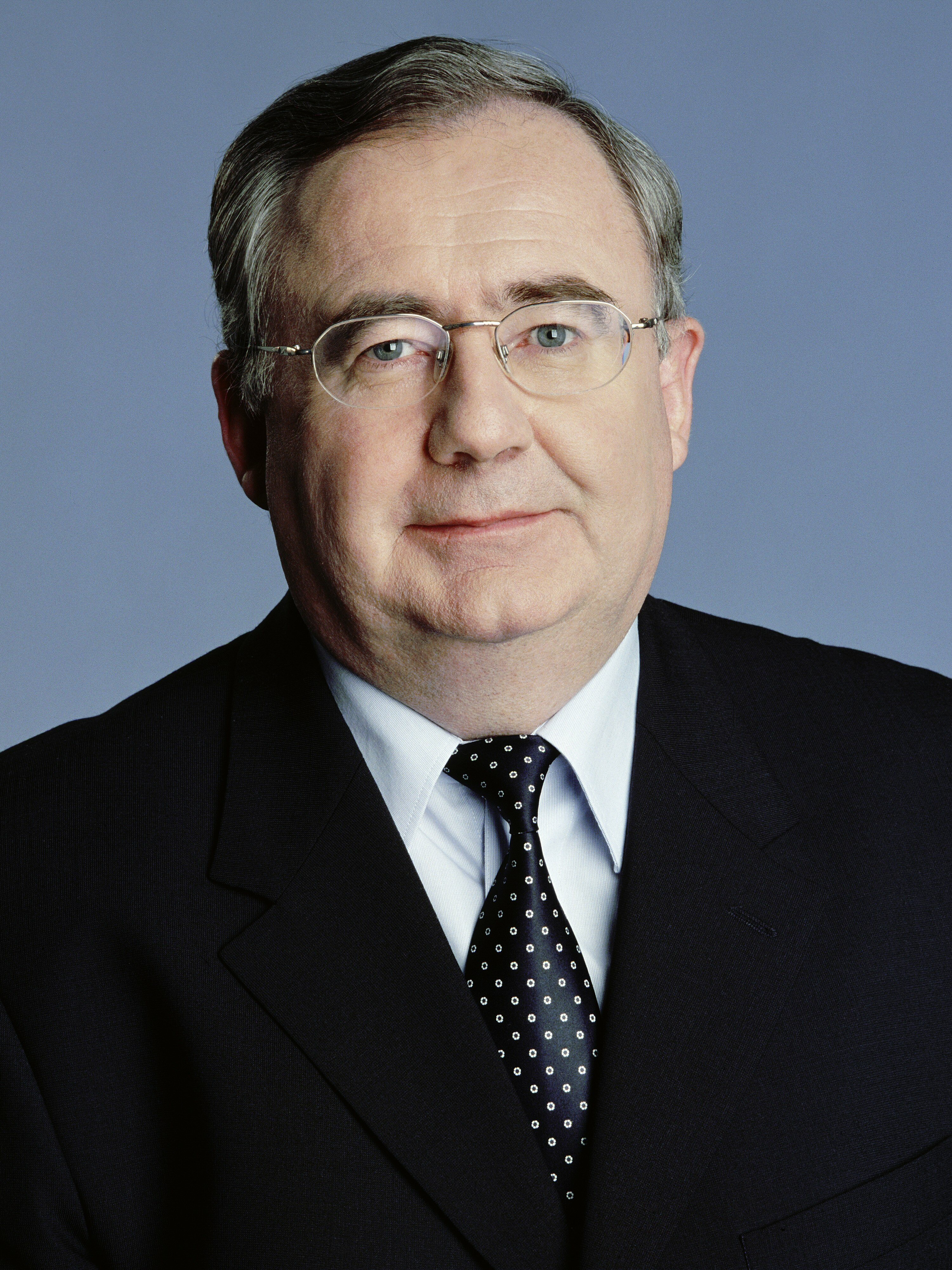

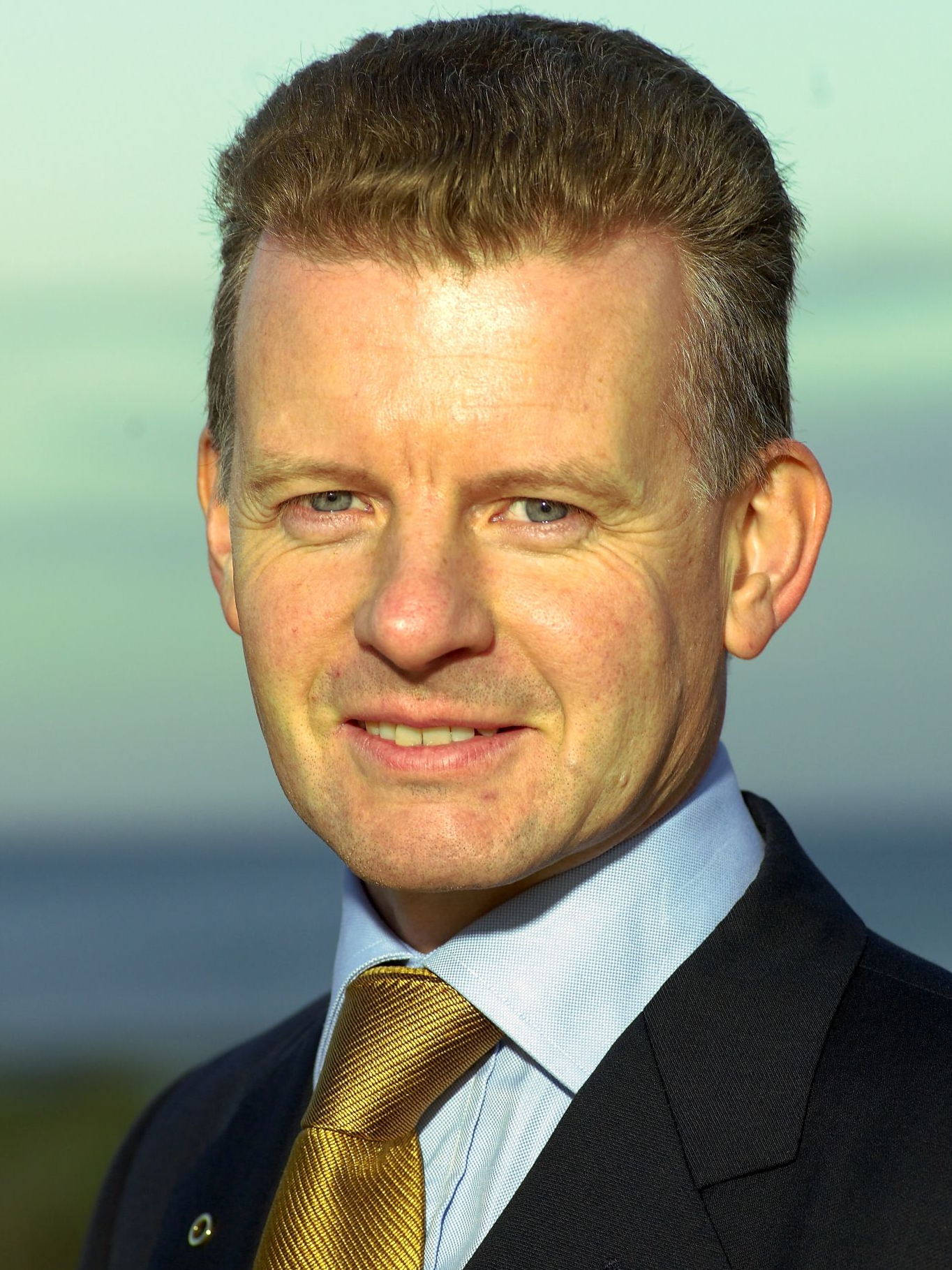

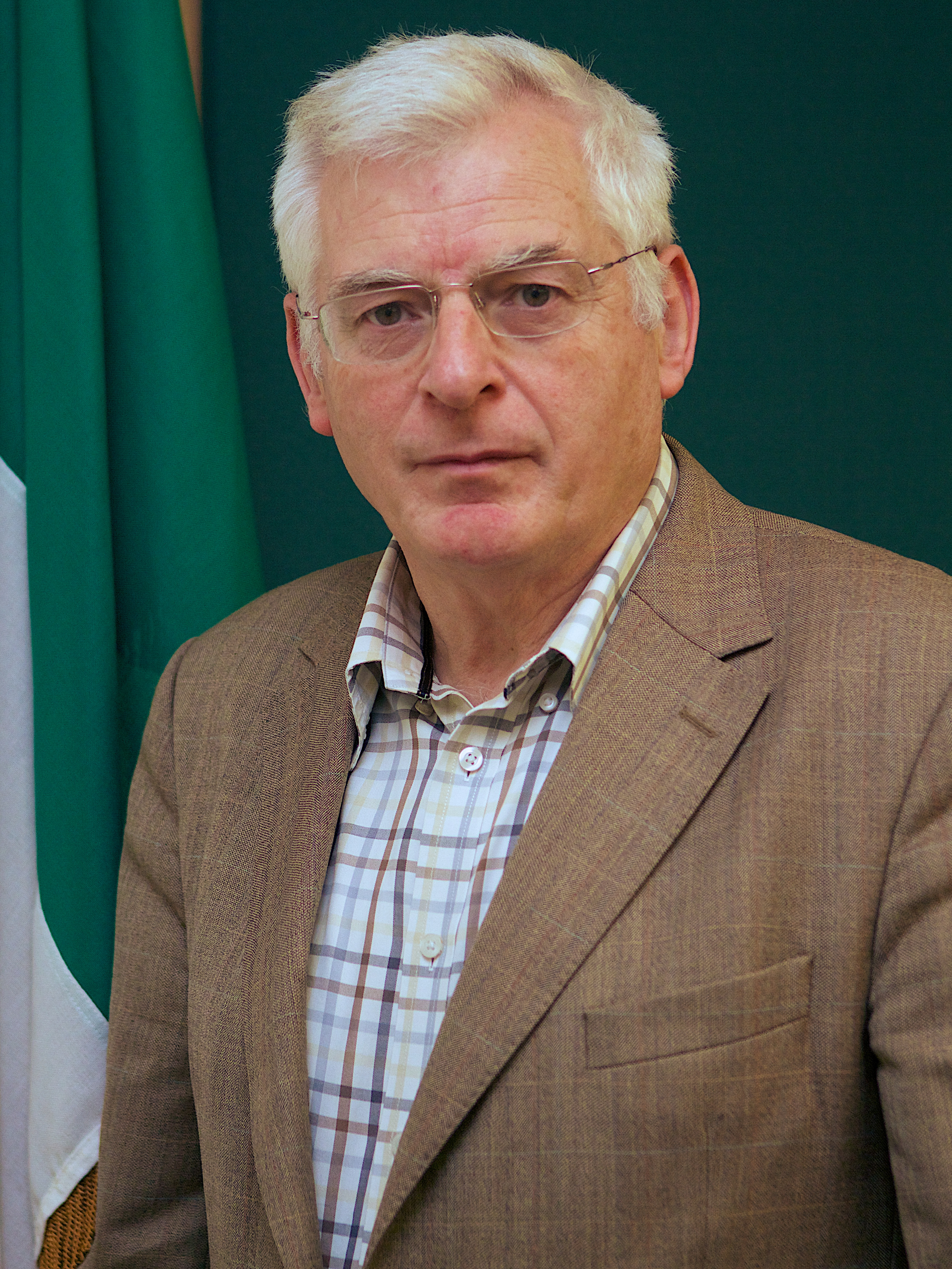
	First party	Second party	Third party
Leader	Enda Kenny	Bertie Ahern	Gerry Adams
Party	Fine Gael	Fianna Fáil	Sinn Féin
Alliance	EPP–ED	UEN	GUE/NGL
Leader since	2 June 2002	19 December 1994	1983
Last election	24.6%, 4 seats	38.6%, 6 seats	6.3%, 0 seats
Seats won	5 / 13	4 / 13	1 / 13
Seat change	▲1	▼2	▲1
Popular vote	464,414	524,504	197,715
Percentage	27.8%	29.5%	11.1%
Swing	▲3.2 pp	▼9.1 pp	▲4.8 pp
	Fourth party	Fifth party	Sixth party
Leader	Pat Rabbitte	Trevor Sargent	Joe Higgins
Party	Labour	Green	Socialist Party
Alliance	PES	Greens/EFA
Leader since	October 2002	6 November 2001	—
Last election	8.7%, 1 seat	6.7%, 2 seats	0.8%, 0 seats
Seats won	1 / 13	0 / 13	0 / 11
Seat change	Steady	▼2	Steady
Popular vote	188,132	76,917	23,218
Percentage	10.5%	4.3%	1.3%
Swing	▲1.8 pp	▼2.4 pp	▲0.5 pp
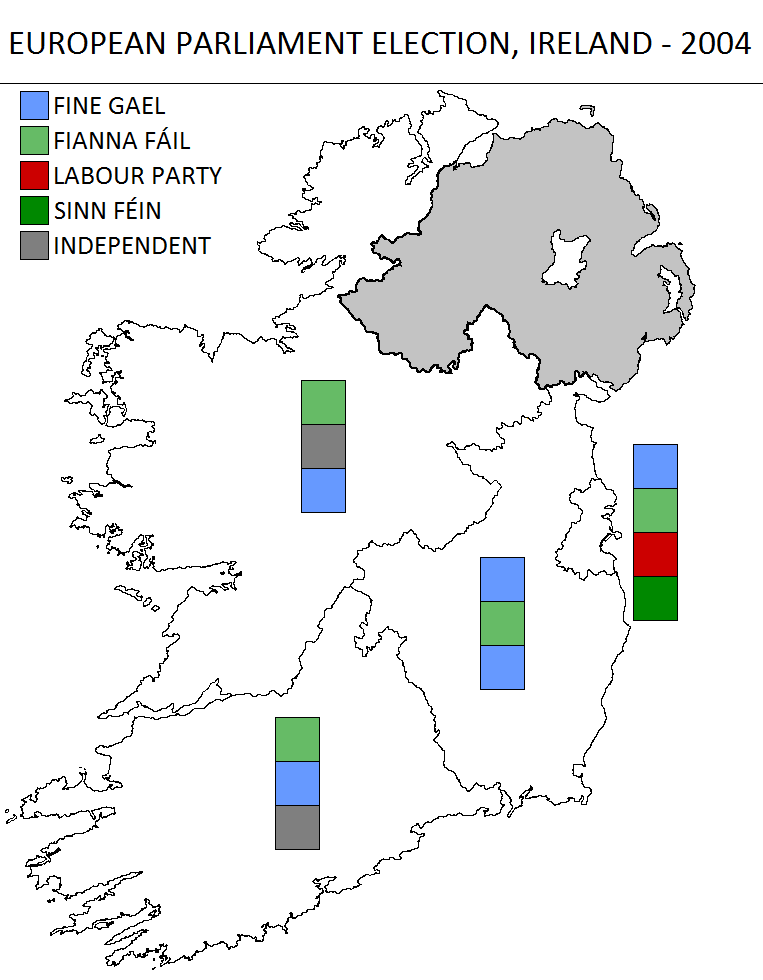
- Colours indicate winning party.

The 2004 European Parliament election in Ireland was the Irish component of the 2004 European Parliament election. The voting was held on Friday, 11 June 2004. The election coincided with the 2004 local elections. The election was conducted under the single transferable vote.

This was the first election that Fine Gael won more seats than Fianna Fáil, who had won most seats at every election from 1979.

== Constituency revision ==
Since the 1999 European Parliament election, Ireland's entitlement had fallen from 15 seats to 13 seats due to European Union expansion and some constituencies boundaries and names were changed.

- Munster constituency lost County Clare and was reduced from 4 seats to 3 and renamed South
- Connacht–Ulster gained County Clare and was renamed North-West
- Leinster had no boundary changes but was reduced from 4 seats to 3 and renamed East
- Dublin was unchanged

== Results ==
The election was organised by city/county council area, the basis for the local elections being held simultaneously. Voters received different-coloured ballot papers for the European election, city/county council election, and a constitutional referendum, all of which went into the same ballot box and were separated by colour once the boxes arrived at the count centre for the city/county. Not all voters received all ballots as the franchises differ. The European ballots were all counted in one city/county, necessitating a second transportation of the separated ballots from the other city/county centres. For example, the East ballots were counted in Navan, County Meath.

Party	Votes	%	+/–	Seats	+/–
Fianna Fáil	524,504	29.45	−9.1	4	−2
Fine Gael	494,412	27.76	+3.2	5	+1
Sinn Féin	197,715	11.10	+4.8	1	+1
Labour Party	188,132	10.56	+1.8	1	0
Green Party	76,917	4.32	−2.4	0	−2
Socialist Party	23,218	1.30	+0.5	0	0
Independent	275,870	15.49	+1.2	2	0
Total	1,780,768	100.00	–	13	−2
Valid votes	1,780,768	96.71			
Invalid/blank votes	60,567	3.29			
Total votes	1,841,335	100.00			
Registered voters/turnout	3,119,484	59.03			

=== MEPs elected ===
Constituency	Name	Party	EP group
Dublin	Gay Mitchell	Fine Gael	EPP–ED
Dublin	Eoin Ryan	Fianna Fáil	UEN
Dublin	Mary Lou McDonald	Sinn Féin	GUE/NGL
Dublin	Proinsias De Rossa	Labour	PES
East	Mairead McGuinness	Fine Gael	EPP–ED
East	Avril Doyle	Fine Gael	EPP–ED
East	Liam Aylward	Fianna Fáil	UEN
North-West	Marian Harkin	Independent	ALDE
North-West	Seán Ó Neachtain	Fianna Fáil	UEN
North-West	Jim Higgins	Fine Gael	EPP–ED
South	Brian Crowley	Fianna Fáil	UEN
South	Simon Coveney	Fine Gael	EPP–ED
South	Kathy Sinnott	Independent	IND/DEM

=== Voting details ===
2004–2009 European Parliament Ireland constituencies

Constituency	Electorate	Turnout	Spoilt	Valid Poll	Quota	Seats	Candidates
Dublin	821,723	435,136 (52.9%)	13,239 (3.0%)	421,897	84,380	4	12
East	806,598	471,895 (58.5%)	18,717 (3.9%)	453,178	113,295	3	13
North-West	688,804	435,910 (63.3%)	14,487 (3.3%)	421,423	105,356	3	9
South	802,359	498,394 (62.1%)	14,124 (2.8%)	484,270	121,068	3	10
Total	3,119,484	1,841,335 (59.0%)	60,567 (3.3%)	1,780,768	—	13	44

=== Seats ===
Constituency	Area	Seats	Pop.	per Seat
Dublin	County Dublin	4	1.1m	275k
East	Leinster less County Dublin	3	1m	333k
South	Munster less County Clare	3	1m	333k
North-West	Connacht plus counties Cavan, Donegal, Monaghan, Clare	3	800k	270k
Total		13	3.9m	300k

== See also ==
- List of members of the European Parliament for Ireland, 2004–2009 – List ordered by constituency
- For the Northern Ireland European Parliament elections, see 2004 UK European Parliament election.
