= Libertas Ireland =

Defunct Irish political party

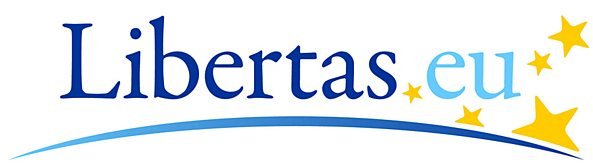
- Leader: Declan Ganley
- Founded: 29 April 2009
- Dissolved: 13 November 2009
- Headquarters: Moyne Park, Tuam, County Galway
- Ideology: Anti-Lisbon Treaty; Social conservatism Economic liberalism Euroscepticism
- Political position: Right-wing
- European affiliation: Libertas.eu
- Colours: Blue, gold

Website
- www.libertas.eu/ireland/

Libertas Ireland was a minor, Eurosceptic political party in Ireland. It contended the 2009 European Parliament elections in Ireland under a common banner with Declan Ganley's Libertas.eu. It shared a headquarters with Libertas.eu (Note: The CRO entry for the Libertas Party was: Type: Company, Number: 463758; Name: The Libertas Party Limited, Address: Moyne Park, Tuam, County Galway, Ireland; Registered: 30 October 2008) but was a national party in its own right for the purposes of Irish electoral law.

== Formation ==
Rumours that Libertas would become a political party began as soon as the Lisbon I referendum rejected the Treaty of Lisbon, and attention eventually moved to whether Libertas would run candidates in Ireland. On 14 March 2009, Ganley held a press conference and announced that it would. Libertas Ireland, (the Libertas national party in Ireland and a party in its own right) was founded on 29 April 2009, some months after the European political party was founded in 2008.

== Personnel ==
Name	Position
John McGuirk (Note: The Register of Political Parties did not indicate who the leader of Libertas was: it stated who the party officers authorised to certify candidates were, and those party officers were John McGuirk, Sean Ganley, Norrie Keane and Eilis Mulroy)	Authenticating Officer
Sean Ganley	Authenticating Officer
Norrie Keane	Authenticating Officer
Eilis Mulroy	Authenticating Officer

== 2009 European Parliament elections ==
=== Candidates ===
Libertas fielded candidates in three European Parliament constituencies in Ireland. It did not intend to field a candidate in South because Libertas had close ties with Kathy Sinnott (IND/EUD/IND-DEM), an MEP for that constituency.

Name	Constituency	Notes
Declan Ganley	North-West	
Caroline Simons	Dublin	Worked with Libertas in its campaign against the Treaty of Lisbon and was legal adviser to the Pro-Life Campaign.
Raymond O'Malley	East	Former deputy president of the Irish Farmers' Association.

=== Campaign ===
At the launch of his party's 2009 European Parliament campaign, Declan Ganley encouraged voters to vote for Libertas as a protest against existing parties, said that Fianna Fáil and Fine Gael were part of a political cartel and that opinion polls that put his party at 2 per cent in the polls disagreed with Libertas own polling. Ganley said that he would step down as party leader if he failed to be elected in the North–West constituency.

Simons criticised Proinsias De Rossa at the launch of the EU parliament campaign, saying that he had been in the parliament for fifteen years and would be seventy next year, but she denied she was discriminating against older people.

O'Malley said that Ireland should close its borders to workers from other EU countries while appearing on The Last Word on Today FM.

=== Results ===
Ganley was not elected; he called for a recount in his constituency and, as a result, his official number of first preferences was reduced by 3,000 from 70,638 when it was discovered that some votes for Fiachra O'Luain has been mistakenly bundled with his. Neither Caroline Simons nor Raymond O'Malley were elected either. Kathy Sinnott also lost her seat.

=== European Parliament ===
Election year	# of total votes	% of overall vote	# of seats won	Rank
2009	99,709 ▲	5.4% ▲	0 / 12	6 ▲

== Dissolution ==
In November 2009, the party was removed from the Register of Political Parties in Ireland. In June 2010, Ganley applied to the Companies Registration Office (CRO) to have the Libertas Party and the Libertas Foundation to be struck off voluntarily. The group had filed no accounts. As of 2010, the Libertas Institute remained active as a think-tank.

== See also ==
- Jens-Peter Bonde
- 2009 European Parliament election
