= East (European Parliament constituency) =

Former European Parliament constituency

- European Parliament constituency
- Location within Europe

- East shown within Ireland (2009–2014 boundaries)
- Member state: Ireland
- Created: 2004
- Dissolved: 2014
- MEPs: 3

East was a European Parliament constituency in Ireland. It elected three Members of the European Parliament (MEPs) on the electoral system of proportional representation by means of the single transferable vote (PR-STV).

== History and boundaries ==
The constituency was created for the 2004 election and was a successor to the constituency of Leinster. From 2004 to 2009, it comprised the Leinster counties excluding the Dublin constituency. For the 2009 election, the counties of Longford and Westmeath were transferred from East to the North-West constituency. It then comprised the counties Carlow, Kildare, Kilkenny, Laois, Louth, Meath, Offaly, Wexford and Wicklow.

For the 2014 European Parliament election the constituency was abolished, with the northern part (Kildare, Laois, Louth, Meath, Offaly) transferred to the new Midlands–North-West constituency, and the southern part (Carlow, Kilkenny, Wexford, Wicklow) transferred to the South constituency.

== MEPs ==
Members of the European Parliament (MEPs) for East 2004–2014
Key to parties: FF = Fianna Fáil; FG = Fine Gael; Lab = Labour
Parl.	Election	Member (Party)	Member (Party)	Member (Party)
6th	2004	Mairead McGuinness (FG)	Liam Aylward (FF)	Avril Doyle (FG)
7th	2009	Mairead McGuinness (FG)	Liam Aylward (FF)	Nessa Childers (Lab)
8th	2014	Constituency abolished. See Midlands–North-West and South.		

Note: The columns in this table are used only for presentational purposes, and no significance should be attached to the order of columns. For details of the order in which seats were won at each election, see the detailed results of that election.

== Elections ==
*: Outgoing MEP elected at the previous election.

=== 2009 election ===
2009 European Parliament election: East (3 seats)
Party	Candidate	FPv%	Count						
Party	Candidate	FPv%	1	2	3	4	5	6	7
Fine Gael	Mairead McGuinness	25.7	110,366						
Labour	Nessa Childers	18.3	78,338	78,914	80,145	84,198	86,654	89,355	102,220
Fianna Fáil	Liam Aylward	17.4	74,666	74,866	75,124	76,295	77,044	99,236	103,605
Fine Gael	John Paul Phelan	14.4	61,851	63,590	64,169	67,972	69,608	70,846	76,960
Fianna Fáil	Thomas Byrne	7.2	31,112	31,264	31,480	32,276	33,383		
Sinn Féin	Kathleen Funchion	6.2	26,567	26,647	27,132	29,305	43,085	44,422	
Sinn Féin	Tomás Sharkey	4.9	20,932	21,034	21,461	23,954			
Libertas	Raymond O'Malley	4.3	18,557	18,728	19,396				
Independent	Paddy Garvey	0.7	2,934	2,945					
Independent	Jim Tallon	0.6	2,412	2,425					
Independent	Micheál E. Grealy	0.4	1,514	1,523					
Electorate: 778,502 Valid: 429,249 Spoilt: 13,042 (2.9%) Quota: 107,313 Turnout: 442,291 (56.8%)

=== 2004 election ===
2004–2009 East constituency boundaries

2004 European Parliament election: East (3 seats)
Party	Candidate	FPv%	Count						
Party	Candidate	FPv%	1	2	3	4	5	6	7
Fine Gael	Mairead McGuinness	25.2	114,249						
Fine Gael	Avril Doyle	15.3	69,511	70,056	71,159	74,429	80,523	86,220	91,046
Fianna Fáil	Liam Aylward	15.1	68,206	68,271	68,756	70,735	73,217	78,126	110,758
Labour	Peter Cassells	13.1	59,158	59,264	60,231	63,119	70,509	79,901	83,981
Fianna Fáil	Séamus Kirk	10.0	45,454	45,514	46,173	47,869	49,629	53,933	
Sinn Féin	John Dwyer	8.7	39,356	39,386	40,258	43,021	46,547		
Green	Mary White	5.6	25,576	25,644	27,093	30,437			
Independent	Justin Barrett	2.4	10,997	11,019	12,023				
Independent	Clifford T. Reid	2.4	10,692	10,718	12,032				
Fathers Rights	Liam Ó Gógáin	0.8	3,407	3,418					
Independent	Seanán Ó Coistín	0.7	3,130	3,141					
Independent	Eoin Dubsky	0.4	1,955	1,960					
Independent	Joe Neal	0.3	1,487	1,492					
Electorate: 806,598 Valid: 453,178 Spoilt: 18,717 (3.9%) Quota: 113,295 Turnout: 471,895 (58.5%)
