= North-West (European Parliament constituency) =

Former European Parliament constituency

- European Parliament constituency
- Location within Europe

- North-West shown within Ireland (2009–2014 boundaries)
- Member state: Ireland
- Created: 2004
- Dissolved: 2014
- MEPs: 3

North-West was a constituency of the European Parliament in Ireland between 2004 and 2014. It elected three Members of the European Parliament (MEPs) using the single transferable vote form of proportional representation (PR-STV).

== History and boundaries ==
The constituency was created in 2004 and was a successor to the Connacht–Ulster constituency. For 2004 election, County Clare was moved from the Munster constituency to the new North-West constituency. For the 2009 election the counties of Longford and Westmeath were transferred from the East constituency to North-West.

From 2009 it comprised the counties of Cavan, Clare, Donegal, Galway, Leitrim, Longford, Mayo, Monaghan, Roscommon, Sligo and Westmeath; and the city of Galway.

For the 2014 European Parliament election the constituency was abolished. All of its area became part of the new Midlands–North-West constituency; with the exception of County Clare which was transferred to the South constituency.

== MEPs ==
Members of the European Parliament (MEPs) for North-West 2004–2014
Key to parties: FF = Fianna Fáil; FG = Fine Gael; Ind = Independent
Parl.	Election	Member (Party)	Member (Party)	Member (Party)
6th	2004	Marian Harkin (Ind)	Jim Higgins (FG)	Seán Ó Neachtain (FF)
7th	2009	Marian Harkin (Ind)	Jim Higgins (FG)	Pat "the Cope" Gallagher (FF)
8th	2014	Constituency abolished. See Midlands–North-West and South.		

Note: The columns in this table are used only for presentational purposes, and no significance should be attached to the order of columns. For details of the order in which seats were won at each election, see the detailed results of that election.

== Elections ==
*: Outgoing MEP elected at the previous election.
†: Outgoing MEP co-opted subsequent to the previous election.

=== 2009 election ===
2009 European Parliament election: North-West
Party	Candidate	FPv%	Count					
Party	Candidate	FPv%	1	2	3	4	5	6
Independent	Marian Harkin	17.1	84,813	89,938	99,561	103,942	112,210	121,672
Fianna Fáil	Pat "the Cope" Gallagher	16.7	82,643	84,680	85,842	87,714	112,622	120,930
Fine Gael	Jim Higgins	16.2	80,093	82,457	86,597	111,133	113,810	120,185
Libertas	Declan Ganley	14.3	67,638	69,925	72,475	73,994	75,705	84,277
Sinn Féin	Pádraig Mac Lochlainn	9.2	45,515	47,413	50,225	52,384	54,737	
Fianna Fáil	Paschal Mooney	8.7	42,985	44,719	45,687	47,702		
Fine Gael	Joe O'Reilly	7.6	37,564	38,854	42,350			
Labour	Susan O'Keeffe	5.8	28,658	31,176				
Independent	Michael McNamara	2.6	12,744					
Independent	Fiachra Ó Luain	1.3	6,510					
Independent	John Francis Higgins	0.6	3,030					
Independent	Noel McCullagh	0.4	1,940					
Independent	Thomas King	0.2	1,124					
Electorate: 805,626 Valid: 495,257 Spoilt: 15,675 (3.1%) Quota: 123,815 Turnout: 510,932 (63.4%)

=== 2004 election ===
2004–2009 North-West constituency boundaries

2004 European Parliament election: North-West
Party	Candidate	FPv%	Count				
Party	Candidate	FPv%	1	2	3	4	5
Independent	Marian Harkin	15.8	66,664	71,458	76,195	81,610	100,522
Sinn Féin	Pearse Doherty	15.5	65,321	68,412	70,309	76,315	85,996
Fianna Fáil	Seán Ó Neachtain	14.7	62,085	62,855	66,130	90,830	102,384
Fine Gael	Jim Higgins	14.1	56,396	61,262	78,938	81,623	92,657
Independent	Dana Rosemary Scallon	13.5	56,992	58,774	66,739	72,889	
Fianna Fáil	Jim McDaid	12.4	52,139	52,938	54,654		
Fine Gael	Madeleine Taylor-Quinn	9.9	41,570	43,093			
Labour	Hughie Baxter	3.3	13,948				
Independent	Mary Hainsworth	0.8	3,308				
Electorate: 688,804 Valid: 421,423 Spoilt: 14,487 (3.3%) Quota: 105,356 Turnout: 435,910 (63.3%)

== See also ==
- European Parliament constituencies in the Republic of Ireland
