= Joe Mooney (politician) =

Irish politician (1916–1988)

Senator
- In office 14 December 1961 – 23 June 1965
- Constituency: Nominated by the Taoiseach

Personal details
- Born: 26 May 1916 County Leitrim, Ireland
- Died: 21 January 1988 (aged 71) County Leitrim, Ireland
- Party: Fianna Fáil
- Children: Paschal Mooney

Joseph Mary Plunkett Mooney (26 May 1916 – 21 January 1988) was an Irish Fianna Fáil politician who served as a Senator for four years.

== Early life and family ==
He was born on 26 May 1916 in County Leitrim, and was named after Joseph Plunkett, one of the leaders of the 1916 Easter Rising. His father Andrew Mooney (born Kilteevan, County Roscommon) married Josephine Gaffney of Drumshanbo in New York in 1908, and relocated to Drumshanbo, County Leitrim where he ran the family business of bar, grocery and drapery shop. Elected as a Sinn Féin councillor in 1919, Andrew Mooney was interned in Ballykinlar Camp, County Down by the British forces during the Irish War of Independence. Following his release in late 1921 he took the pro-Treaty side joining Cumann na nGaedheal, but left that party over a Dáil nomination dispute in 1929. He remained an independent councillor until his death in 1943.

== Politics ==
Joe Mooney was nominated to his father's seat in 1943 and served until his death in 1988. He was an independent member of Leitrim County Council until 1961 when he joined Fianna Fáil and stood unsuccessfully as a Dáil candidate in the 1961 general election for the Sligo–Leitrim constituency. In December 1961, the Taoiseach Seán Lemass nominated Mooney to Seanad Éireann.

Mooney served as a senator until 1965 when Lemass called a snap general election. Although Mooney was considered a shoo-in for the Fianna Fáil nomination, he was not selected as a candidate. At the 1969 general election, Mooney was once again called upon to be the candidate for Fianna Fáil in the Sligo–Leitrim constituency, following further boundary changes which meant that a Leitrim-based candidate like Mooney had little chance of being elected. Mooney was also a candidate at the 1973 general election but again he was not elected.

== Other activities ==
He was a founding member of Comhaltas Ceoltóirí Éireann (CCE), serving as Chairman of the Connacht Council of CCE for ten years. He was also a founding member of the national cultural festival known as An Tóstal started in 1953 to extend the tourist season by encouraging towns and villages across Ireland to present a week-long series of events reflective of their area. Drumshanbo is now the only town in Ireland where the An Tóstal festival continues to this day each June bank holiday weekend.

Following his death, a local committee decided to commence a Summer School in Mooney's memory and today the Annual Joe Mooney Summer School attracts many people from all over the world.

The Drumshanbo Vocational School also stands as a memorial to Joe Mooney who persuaded the government during his time as a Senator to build a second-level school in the town. It is now the largest vocational school in the county.

His son Paschal Mooney also served as a senator.

== See also ==
- Families in the Oireachtas
