= 2009 European Parliament election in Ireland =

- 5 June 2009

12 seats to the European Parliament
- Turnout: 1,875,920 (57.6% ▼1.4 pp)
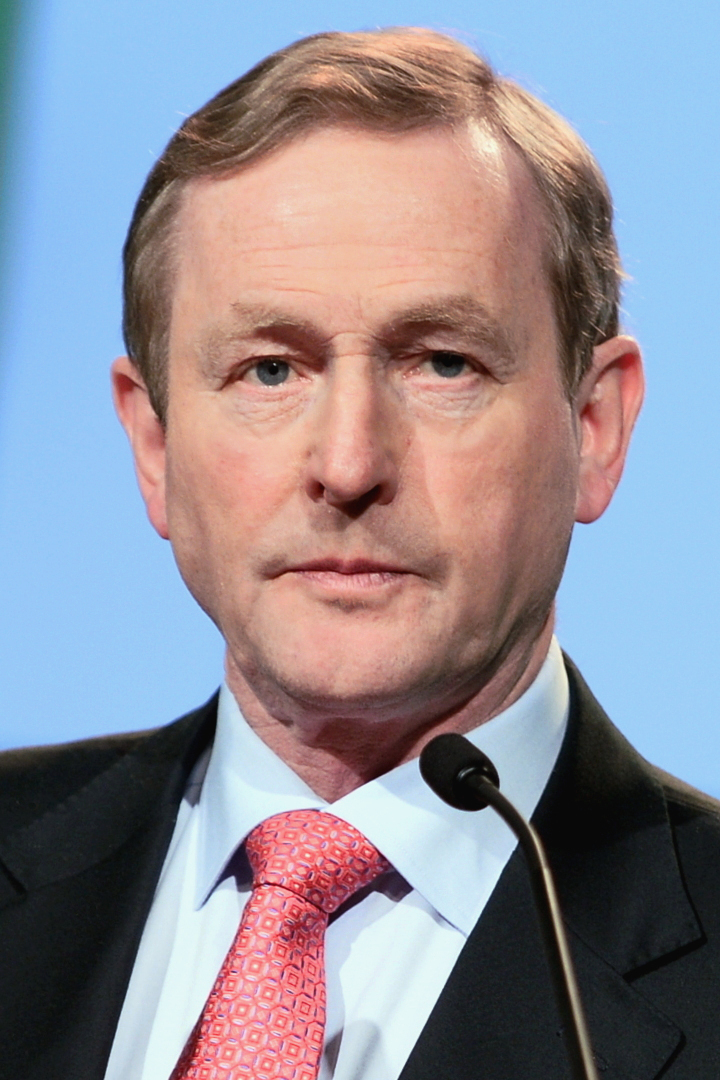

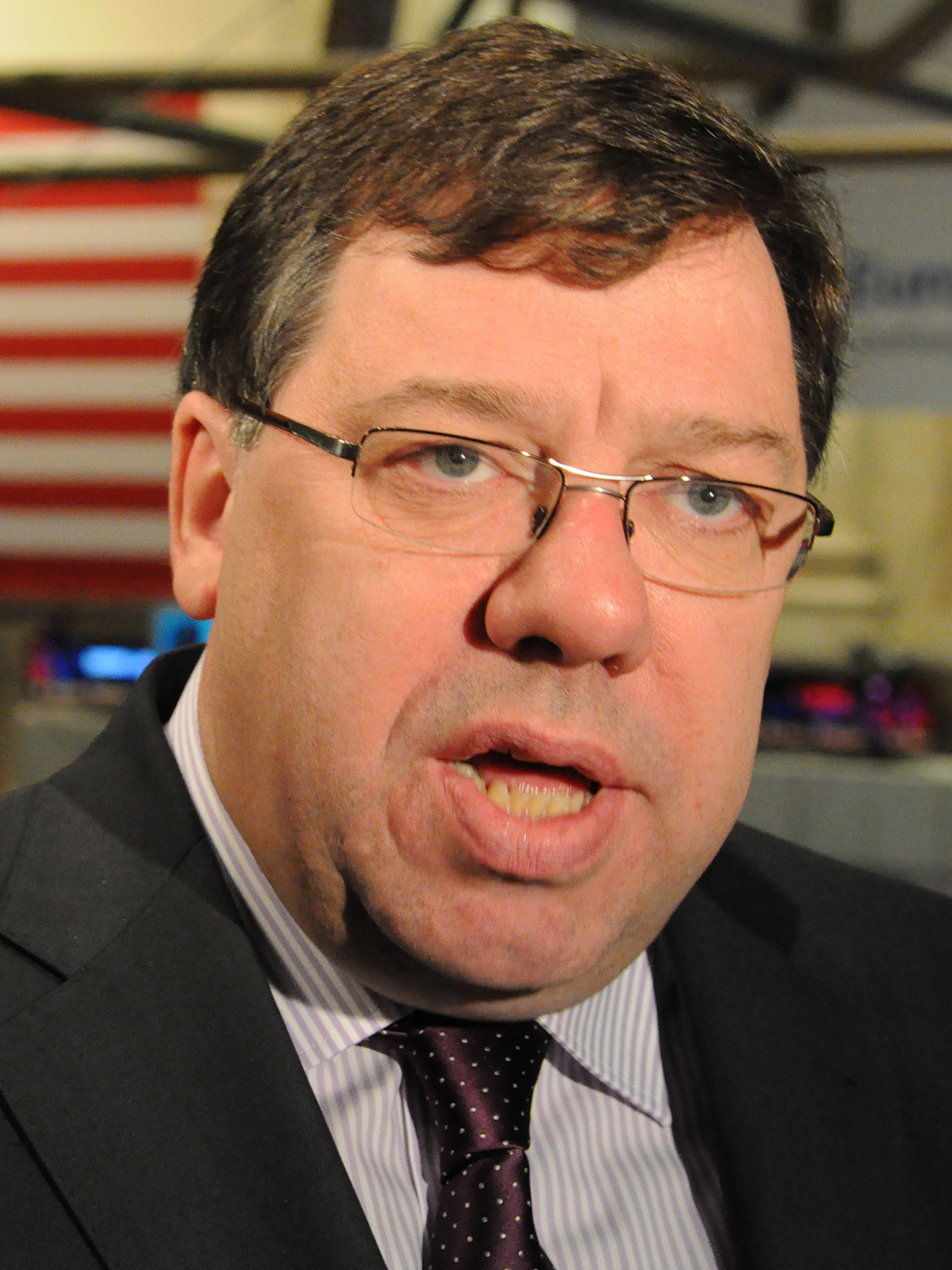

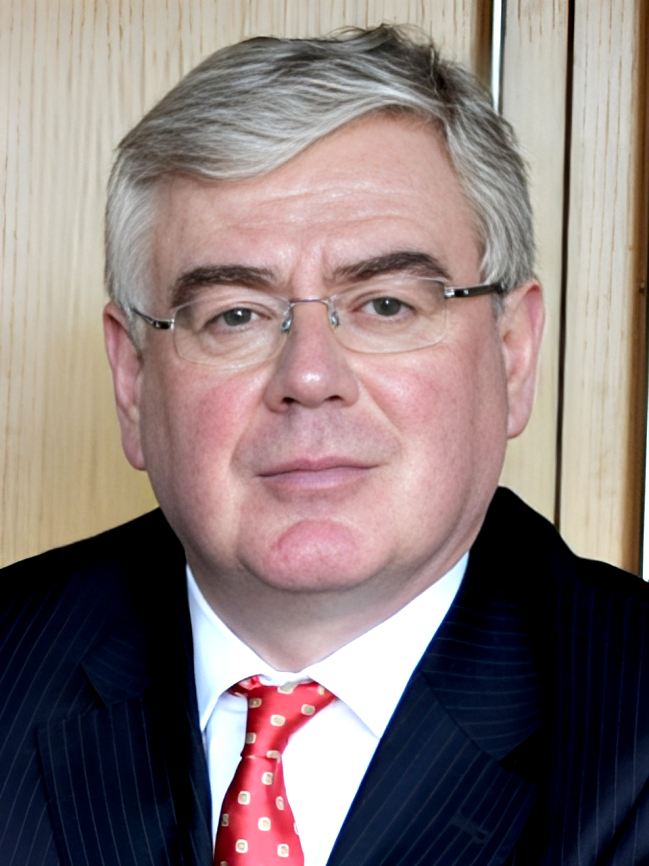

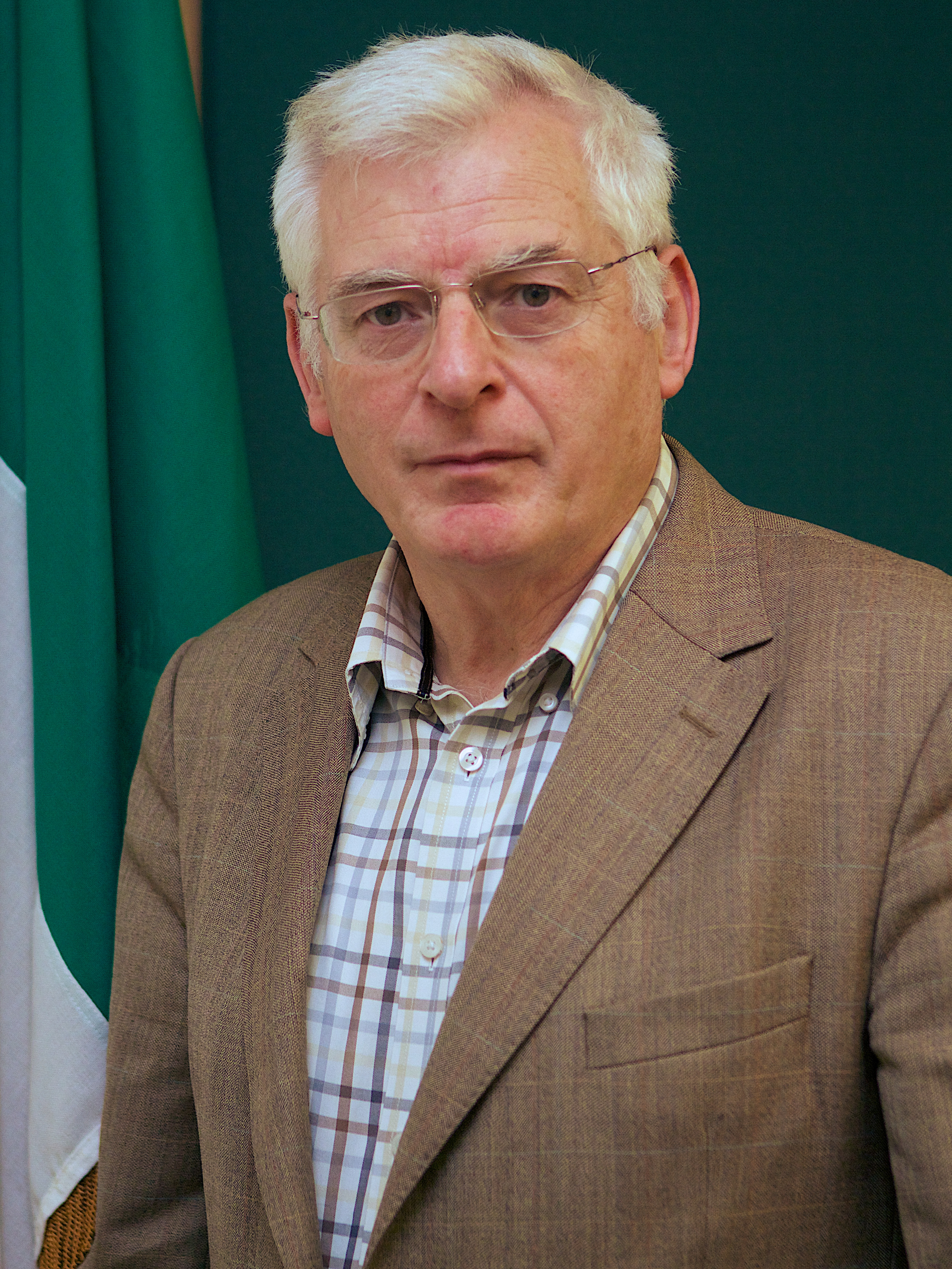

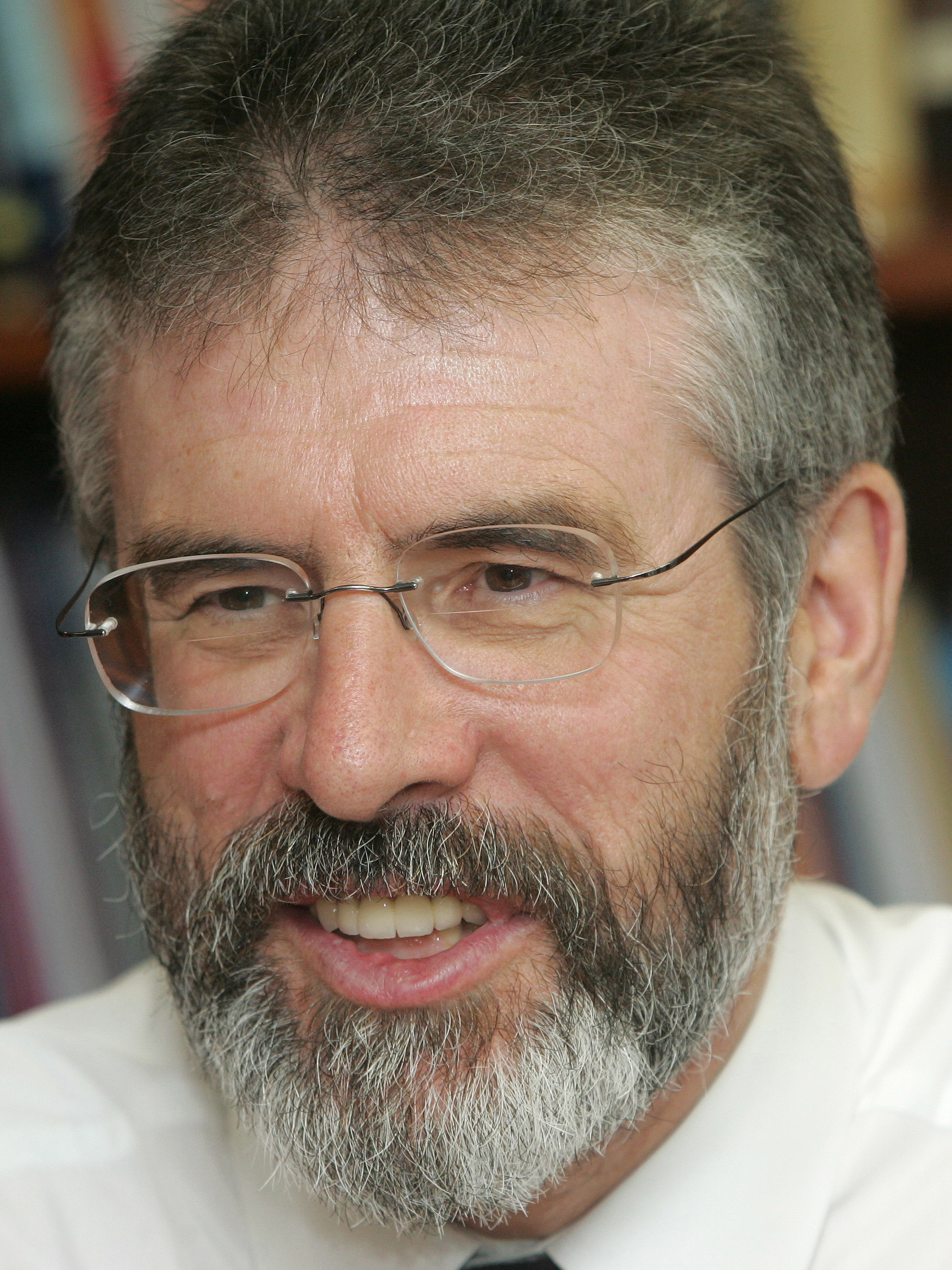
	First party	Second party	Third party
Leader	Enda Kenny	Brian Cowen	Eamon Gilmore
Party	Fine Gael	Fianna Fáil	Labour
Alliance	EPP	ALDE	S&D
Leader since	2 June 2002	7 May 2008	6 September 2007
Last election	27.8%, 5 seats	29.5%, 4 seats	10.5%, 1 seat
Seats won	4 / 12	3 / 12	3 / 12
Seat change	▼1	▼1	▲2
Popular vote	532,889	440,562	254,669
Percentage	29.1%	24.1%	13.9%
Swing	▲1.3 pp	▼5.4 pp	▲3.4 pp
	Fourth party	Fifth party	Sixth party
			LI
Leader	Joe Higgins	Gerry Adams	Declan Ganley
Party	Socialist Party	Sinn Féin	Libertas
Alliance	GUE/NGL	GUE/NGL	Lib.eu
Leader since	1996	1983	30 October 2008
Last election	1.3%, 0 seats	11.1%, 1 seat	New
Seats won	1 / 12	0 / 12	0 / 12
Seat change	▲1	▼1	Steady
Popular vote	50,510	205,613	99,709
Percentage	2.7%	11.2%	5.4%
Swing	▲1.4 pp	▲0.1 pp	▲5.4 pp
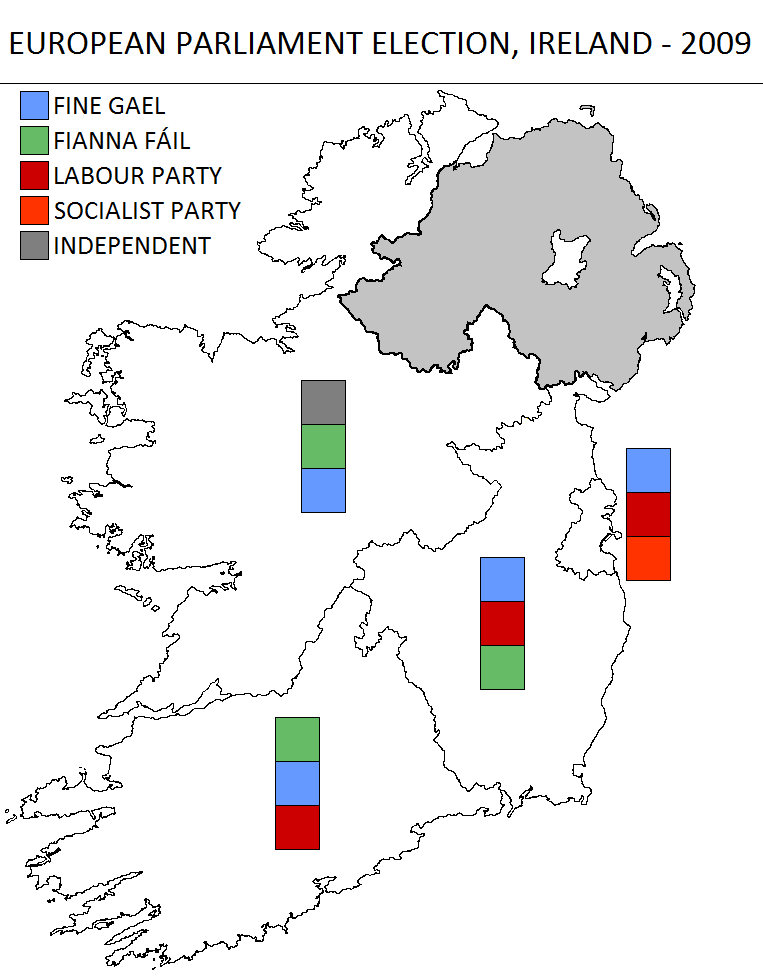
- Colours indicate winning party.

The 2009 European Parliament election in Ireland was the Irish component of the 2009 European Parliament election and was held on Friday, 5 June 2009, coinciding with the 2009 local elections. Two by-elections (Dublin South and Dublin Central) were also held on the same day.

== National and regional summaries ==
The governing Fianna Fáil party lost one MEP and a significant share of the vote, in line with the day's other election results. Fine Gael increased its national vote share but lost a seat. The Labour Party, which increased its delegation from one MEP to three, was the only major party to make seat gains. Sinn Féin lost its only MEP in the Republic of Ireland, and the Socialist Party won a seat for the first time. One independent MEP lost her seat. The Green Party's vote was halved, and the pan-European Libertas party, based in Ireland, also failed to make a breakthrough.

In Dublin, Gay Mitchell of Fine Gael and Proinsias De Rossa of Labour were re-elected, while Joe Higgins of the Socialist Party defeated the incumbent Fianna Fáil and Sinn Féin MEPs to take the third seat. In the East constituency, Mairead McGuinness of Fine Gael and Liam Aylward of Fianna Fáil were re-elected. Nessa Childers of Labour took the vacant final seat. North-West re-elected independent ALDE MEP Marian Harkin and Jim Higgins of Fine Gael, while the Fianna Fáil seat was retained by former MEP Pat "the Cope" Gallagher. In South, Brian Crowley of Fianna Fáil was re-elected, Seán Kelly won a seat from his Fine Gael colleague Colm Burke, and Labour's Alan Kelly took the last seat in a tight contest between him, Sinn Féin's Toiréasa Ferris and the incumbent Independent Kathy Sinnott in the final count.

== Constituency changes ==
In accordance with the terms of the Treaty of Nice, the number of MEPs from Ireland in the European Parliament was reduced from 13 to 12 for this election. The Dublin constituency was reduced from 4 seats to 3, and the counties of Longford and Westmeath were transferred from the East constituency to the North-West constituency. The election was conducted under the single transferable vote in Ireland; the only other constituencies to elect their MEPs under STV are Malta and Northern Ireland, with the rest of Europe using variants of the list system.

Local and Euro election posters and banners in Cork city

== Results ==
2009–2014 European Parliament Ireland constituencies

Party	Votes	%	+/–	Seats	+/–
Fine Gael	532,889	29.13	+1.3	4	-1
Fianna Fáil	440,562	24.08	-5.4	3	-1
Labour Party	254,669	13.92	+3.4	3	+2
Sinn Féin	205,613	11.24	+0.1	0	-1
Libertas Ireland	99,709	5.45	New	0	New
Socialist Party	50,510	2.76	+1.4	1	+1
Green Party	34,585	1.89	-2.4	0	0
Independent	210,776	11.52	-4.0	1	-1
Total	1,829,313	100.00	–	12	-1
Valid votes	1,829,313	97.52			
Invalid/blank votes	46,607	2.48			
Total votes	1,875,920	100.00			
Registered voters/turnout	3,258,320	57.57			

=== MEPs elected ===
Constituency	Name	Party	EP group
Dublin	Gay Mitchell	Fine Gael	EPP
Dublin	Proinsias De Rossa	Labour	S&D
Dublin	Joe Higgins	Socialist Party	GUE/NGL
East	Mairead McGuinness	Fine Gael	EPP
East	Nessa Childers	Labour	S&D
East	Liam Aylward	Fianna Fáil	ALDE
North-West	Marian Harkin	Independent	ALDE
North-West	Seán Ó Neachtain	Fianna Fáil	ALDE
North-West	Jim Higgins	Fine Gael	EPP
South	Brian Crowley	Fianna Fáil	ALDE
South	Seán Kelly	Fine Gael	EPP
South	Alan Kelly	Labour	S&D

=== Voting details ===
Constituency	Electorate	Turnout	Spoilt	Valid Poll	Quota	Seats	Candidates
Dublin	812,465	412,684 (50.8%)	6,054 (1.5%)	406,630	101,658	3	10
East	778,502	442,291 (56.8%)	13,042 (2.9%)	429,249	107,313	3	11
North-West	805,626	510,982 (63.4%)	15,675 (3.1%)	495,307	123,827	3	13
South	861,727	509,963 (59.2%)	11,836 (2.3%)	498,127	124,532	3	10
Total	3,258,320	1,875,920 (57.5%)	46,607 (2.5%)	1,829,313	—	12	44

== See also ==
- List of members of the European Parliament for Ireland, 2009–2014 – List ordered by constituency
