= List of members of the European Parliament for Ireland, 2014–2019 =

This is a list of the 11 members of the European Parliament for Ireland elected at the 2014 European Parliament election. They served in the 2014 to 2019 session.

== List ==
Name	Constituency	National party	EP group
Lynn Boylan	Dublin	Sinn Féin	GUE/NGL
Matt Carthy	Midlands–North-West	Sinn Féin	GUE/NGL
Nessa Childers	Dublin	Independent	S&D
Deirdre Clune	South	Fine Gael	EPP
Brian Crowley	South	Independent	ECR
Luke 'Ming' Flanagan	Midlands–North-West	Independent	GUE/NGL
Marian Harkin	Midlands–North-West	Independent	ALDE
Brian Hayes	Dublin	Fine Gael	EPP
Seán Kelly	South	Fine Gael	EPP
Mairead McGuinness	Midlands–North-West	Fine Gael	EPP
Liadh Ní Riada	South	Sinn Féin	GUE/NGL

== See also ==
- Members of the European Parliament (2014–2019) – List by country
- List of members of the European Parliament (2014–2019) – Full alphabetical list
