= List of members of the European Parliament for Portugal, 2004–2009 =

This is a list of the 24 members of the European Parliament for Portugal in the 2004 to 2009 session.

== List ==
Name	National party	EP Group
António Costa (2004–2005)	Socialist Party	PES
Ana Gomes	Socialist Party	PES
Francisco Assis	Socialist Party	PES
Elisa Ferreira	Socialist Party	PES
Paulo Casaca	Socialist Party	PES
Sérgio Sousa Pinto	Socialist Party	PES
Fausto Correia (2004–2007)	Socialist Party	PES
Edite Estrela	Socialist Party	PES
Luís Capoulas Santos	Socialist Party	PES
Jamila Madeira	Socialist Party	PES
Emanuel Jardim Fernandes	Socialist Party	PES
Manuel António dos Santos	Socialist Party	PES
Joel Hasse Ferreira (2005–2009)	Socialist Party	PES
Armando França (2007–2009)	Socialist Party	PES
João de Deus Pinheiro	Social Democratic Party	EPP–ED
Vasco Graça Moura	Social Democratic Party	EPP–ED
Assunção Esteves	Social Democratic Party	EPP–ED
José Silva Peneda	Social Democratic Party	EPP–ED
Sérgio Marques	Social Democratic Party	EPP–ED
Duarte Freitas	Social Democratic Party	EPP–ED
Carlos Coelho	Social Democratic Party	EPP–ED
Luís Queiró	CDS – People's Party	EPP–ED
José Ribeiro e Castro	CDS – People's Party	EPP–ED
Ilda Figueiredo	Portuguese Communist Party	EUL–NGL
Sérgio Ribeiro (2004–2005)	Portuguese Communist Party	EUL–NGL
Pedro Guerreiro (2005–2009)	Portuguese Communist Party	EUL–NGL
Miguel Portas	Left Bloc	EUL–NGL
