= List of members of the European Parliament for Estonia, 2004–2009 =

This is the list of the 6 members of the European Parliament for Estonia in the 2004 to 2009 session.

== List ==
Name	National party	EP Group
Toomas Hendrik Ilves	Social Democratic Party	PES
Tunne Kelam	Pro Patria Union	EPP–ED
Marianne Mikko	Social Democratic Party	PES
Siiri Oviir	Centre Party	ALDE
Toomas Savi	Reform Party	ALDE
Andres Tarand	Social Democratic Party	PES

=== Party representation ===
National party	EP Group	Seats	±
Social Democratic Party	PES	3 / 6	
Centre Party	ALDE	1 / 6	
Reform Party	ALDE	1 / 6	
Pro Patria Union	EPP–ED	1 / 6	
