= Jim Higgins (Irish politician) =

Irish politician (born 1945)

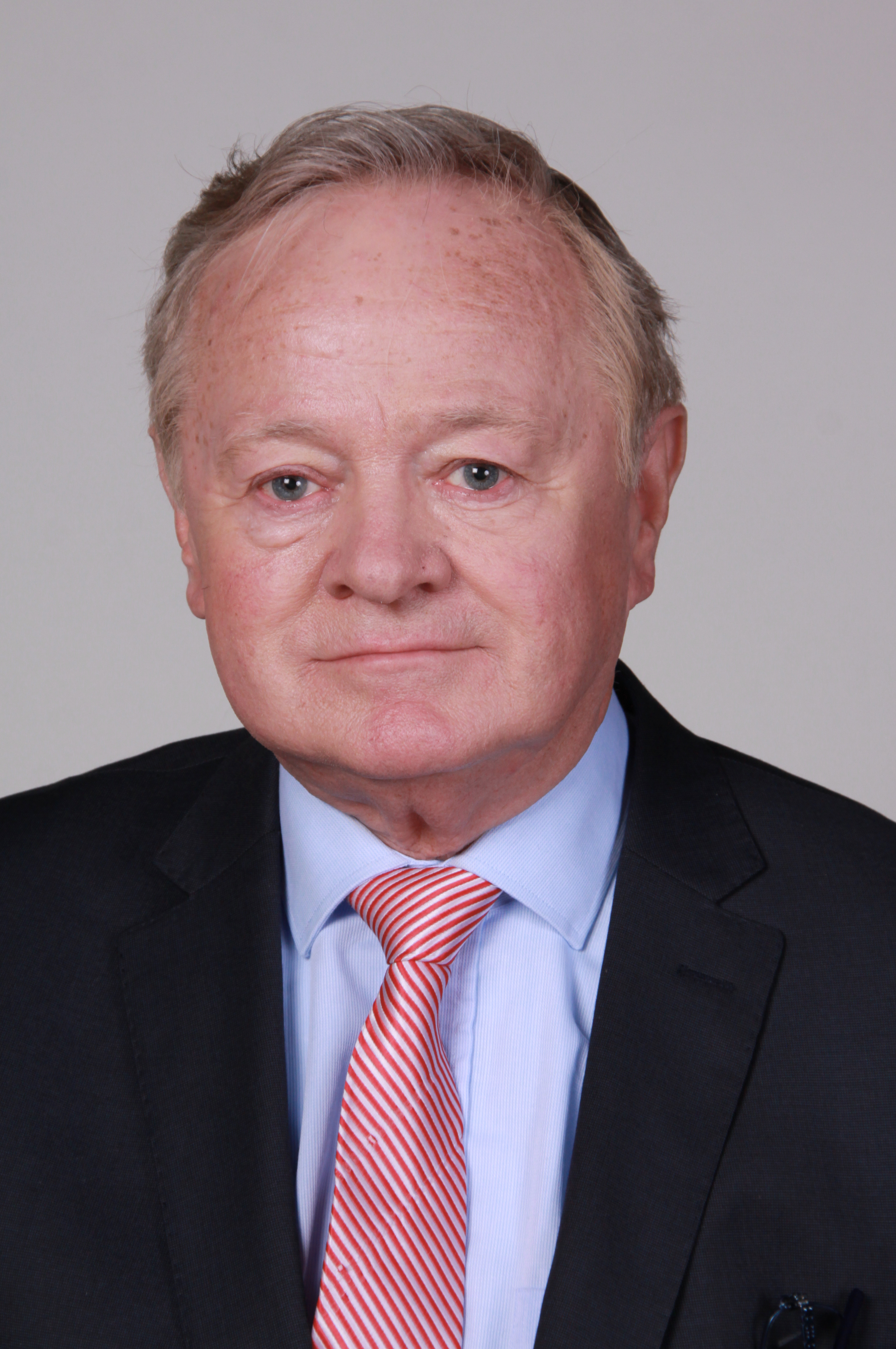
- Higgins in 2014

Member of the European Parliament
- In office June 2004 – May 2014
- Constituency: North-West

Minister of State
- 1995–1997: Government Chief Whip
- 1995–1997: Defence
- 1995: Finance

Teachta Dála
- In office June 1997 – May 2002
- Constituency: Mayo
- In office February 1987 – June 1997
- Constituency: Mayo East

Senator
- In office 12 September 2002 – 13 September 2007
- In office 23 February 1983 – 17 February 1987
- Constituency: Labour Panel
- In office 8 October 1981 – 13 May 1982
- Constituency: Nominated by the Taoiseach

Personal details
- Born: 4 May 1945 (age 81) Ballyhaunis, County Mayo, Ireland
- Party: Fine Gael
- Education: University College Galway

Jim Higgins (born 4 May 1945) is an Irish former Fine Gael politician. He served as a member of Seanad Éireann, Dáil Éireann, and was a European People's Party Member of the European Parliament for the North-West constituency from 2004 to 2014.

== Early life ==
He was born in Ballyhaunis, County Mayo in 1945. He was educated at St. Jarlath's College, Tuam and at University College Galway. He was twice named Best Individual Speaker at the Junior Chamber Ireland debating championships (1978, 1979) and was the captain of the International Tripartite Debating Team. Higgins worked as a secondary school teacher before becoming involved in local politics.

== Political career ==
Video Statement (English) / (Irish)

He served as a member of Mayo County Council from 1979 to 1995, acting as vice-chair of the council from 1980 to 1981. He first ran for Dáil Éireann at the 1981 general election, but was unsuccessful. However, he was nominated by the Taoiseach Garret FitzGerald to the 15th Seanad Éireann.

He lost his Seanad seat in 1982 but was elected to the 17th Seanad by the Labour Panel in 1983, remaining in the upper house until 1987 as a member of the 17th Seanad. He was successful at the 1987 general election, winning a seat in the 25th Dáil as a Fine Gael Teachta Dála (TD) for Mayo East. He was re-elected to the Dáil in 1989, 1992 and 1997.

In 1994 the Rainbow Coalition of Fine Gael, Labour Party and Democratic Left came to power and Higgins was appointed as Minister of State at the Department of Finance. The following year he became Minister of State at the Departments of the Taoiseach and Defence, as well as Chief Whip of the government. He remained in that position until a Fianna Fáil–Progressive Democrats coalition took office after the 1997 general election.

Like many of his Fine Gael colleagues at the 2002 general election, Higgins lost his seat in the Mayo constituency. However, he was elected to Seanad Éireann by the Labour Panel, becoming a member of the 22nd Seanad.

For over two years he brought to the Dáil the case of the extended McBrearty family who were wrongly accused of murder. He raised allegations of Garda corruption in County Donegal. He was also responsible for bringing before the Dáil a £30 million overspend by the state transport company Iarnród Éireann on a safety signalling system which led to the establishment of an all-party parliamentary inquiry.

=== European Parliament ===
In the 2004 European Parliament election Higgins was elected to the European Parliament as a Fine Gael / European People's Party MEP for the North-West constituency. He was re-elected at the 2009 European Parliament election.

At the European Parliament, he served as a member of the Committee on Transport and Tourism. He was a substitute member of the Petitions Committee. He was also a substituent member of the Fisheries Committee. Higgins's other duties included membership of the EU-Chile Joint Parliamentary Committee, the Euro-Latin American Parliamentary Assembly and he was a substitute member of the Delegation for Relations with Japan.

He was one of five MEPs to hold the position of Quaestor. He was elected by other parliamentarians in the European Parliament to this position. He lost his seat at the 2014 European Parliament election.

Political offices
Preceded by Phil Hogan	Minister of State at the Department of Finance; Feb–May 1995	Succeeded by Hugh Coveney
Preceded by Seán Barrett	Government Chief Whip; 1995–1997	Succeeded by Séamus Brennan
Preceded by Seán Barrett	Minister of State at the Department of Defence; 1995–1997	Succeeded by Séamus Brennan
Party political offices
Preceded by Michael Lowry	Chair of the Fine Gael parliamentary party 1994–1995	Succeeded by Phil Hogan

Dáil	Election	Deputy (Party)	Deputy (Party)	Deputy (Party)
19th	1969	Seán Flanagan (FF)	Thomas O'Hara (FG)	Martin Finn (FG)
20th	1973	Seán Flanagan (FF)	Seán Calleary (FF)	Martin Finn (FG)
21st	1977	P. J. Morley (FF)	Seán Calleary (FF)	Paddy O'Toole (FG)
22nd	1981	P. J. Morley (FF)	Seán Calleary (FF)	Paddy O'Toole (FG)
23rd	1982 (Feb)	P. J. Morley (FF)	Seán Calleary (FF)	Paddy O'Toole (FG)
24th	1982 (Nov)	P. J. Morley (FF)	Seán Calleary (FF)	Paddy O'Toole (FG)
25th	1987	P. J. Morley (FF)	Seán Calleary (FF)	Jim Higgins (FG)
26th	1989	P. J. Morley (FF)	Seán Calleary (FF)	Jim Higgins (FG)
27th	1992	P. J. Morley (FF)	Tom Moffatt (FF)	Jim Higgins (FG)
28th	1997	Constituency abolished. See Mayo		

Dáil	Election	Deputy (Party)	Deputy (Party)	Deputy (Party)	Deputy (Party)	Deputy (Party)
28th	1997	Beverley Flynn (FF)	Tom Moffatt (FF)	Enda Kenny (FG)	Michael Ring (FG)	Jim Higgins (FG)
29th	2002	Beverley Flynn (FF)	John Carty (FF)	Enda Kenny (FG)	Michael Ring (FG)	Jerry Cowley (Ind.)
30th	2007	Beverley Flynn (Ind.)	Dara Calleary (FF)	Enda Kenny (FG)	Michael Ring (FG)	John O'Mahony (FG)
31st	2011	Michelle Mulherin (FG)	Dara Calleary (FF)	Enda Kenny (FG)	Michael Ring (FG)	John O'Mahony (FG)
32nd	2016	Lisa Chambers (FF)	Dara Calleary (FF)	Enda Kenny (FG)	Michael Ring (FG)	4 seats 2016–2024
33rd	2020	Rose Conway-Walsh (SF)	Dara Calleary (FF)	Alan Dillon (FG)	Michael Ring (FG)	4 seats 2016–2024
34th	2024	Rose Conway-Walsh (SF)	Dara Calleary (FF)	Alan Dillon (FG)	Keira Keogh (FG)	Paul Lawless (Aon)
