= List of members of the European Parliament for Luxembourg, 2004–2009 =

This is a list of the 6 members of the European Parliament for Luxembourg in the 2004 to 2009 session.

== List ==
Name	National party	EP Group	Votes
Robert Goebbels	Socialist Workers' Party	PES	12,169
Erna Hennicot-Schoepges	Christian Social People's Party	EPP–ED	7,453
Astrid Lulling	Christian Social People's Party	EPP–ED	12,809
Lydie Polfer	Democratic Party	ALDE	22,179
Jean Spautz	Christian Social People's Party	EPP–ED	12,302
Claude Turmes	The Greens	G–EFA	13,828

=== Party representation ===
National party	EP Group	Seats	±
Christian Social People's Party	EPP	3 / 6	▲1
Socialist Workers' Party	PES	1 / 6	▼1
The Greens	G	1 / 6	Steady
Democratic Party	LD	1 / 6	Steady
