= Seán Ó Neachtain (politician) =

Irish former politician (born 1947)

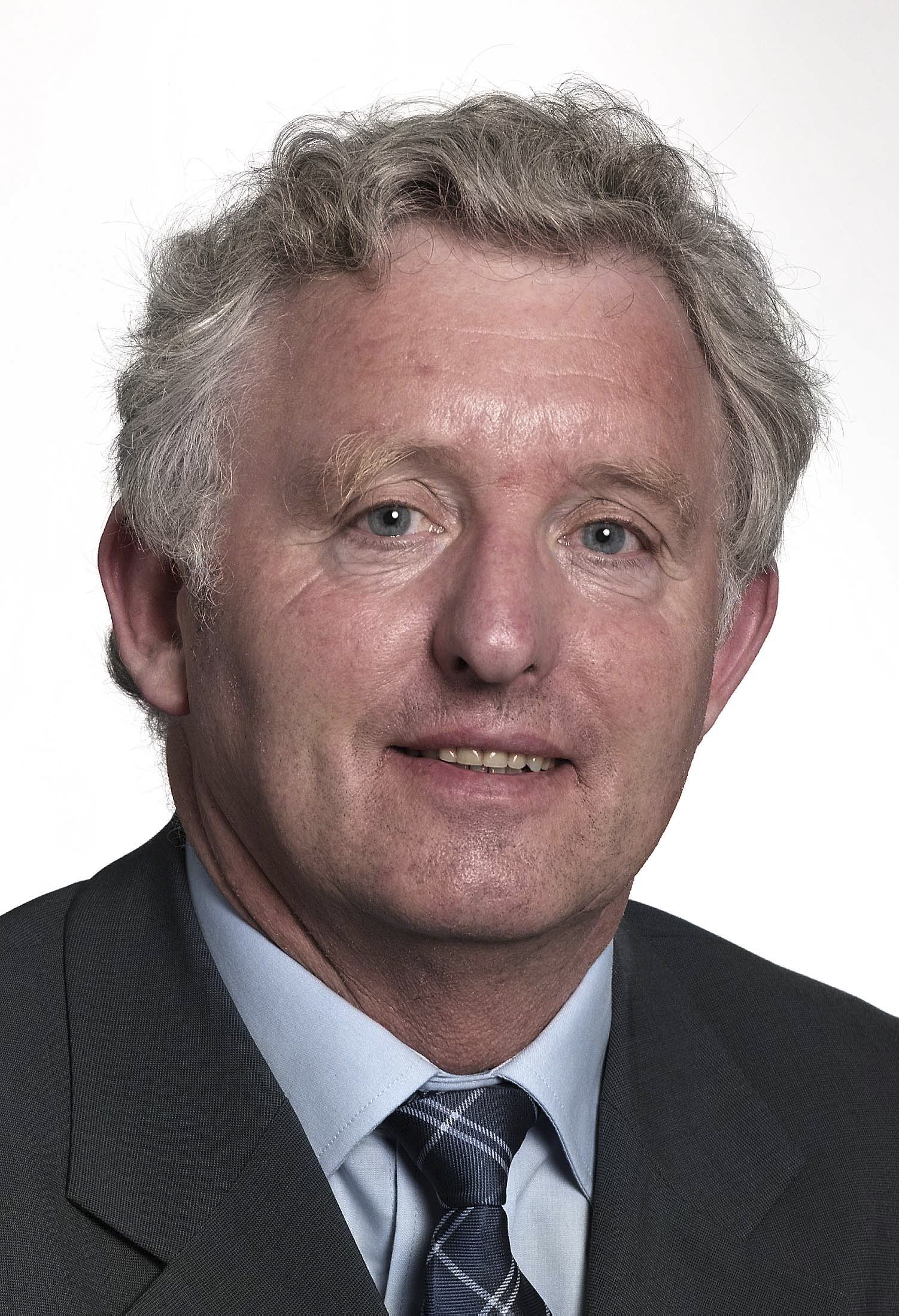
- Ó Neachtain in 2002

Member of the European Parliament
- In office June 2004 – June 2009
- Constituency: North-West
- In office July 2002 – June 2004
- Constituency: Connacht–Ulster

Personal details
- Born: 22 May 1947 (age 78) Galway, Ireland
- Party: Fianna Fáil

Seán Ó Neachtain (born 22 May 1947) is an Irish former Fianna Fáil politician. He was a Member of the European Parliament for the Connacht–Ulster from 2002 and North-West constituencies from 2004, when he was substituted for Pat "the Cope" Gallagher, until 2009.

He was a member of the Transport and Tourism Committee, as well as the Fisheries Committee. Ó Neachtain was instrumental to the recognition of the Irish language as an official working language of the European Union.

After obtaining a BA (hons) in 1969, Ó Neachtain became a school teacher. He worked in this capacity through the 1970s and 1980s. He was involved in regional politics around Galway and western Ireland from 1979, and served as a member of Galway County Council from 1991 to 2002. He made his first foray into European politics when he was appointed as a member of the Committee of the Regions in 1994. He was an unsuccessful candidate for the Galway West constituency at the 1997 general election.

On 20 April 2009, he announced that he would not be contesting the 2009 European Parliament election due to health concerns.
