= Kathy Sinnott =

Irish former politician (born 1950)

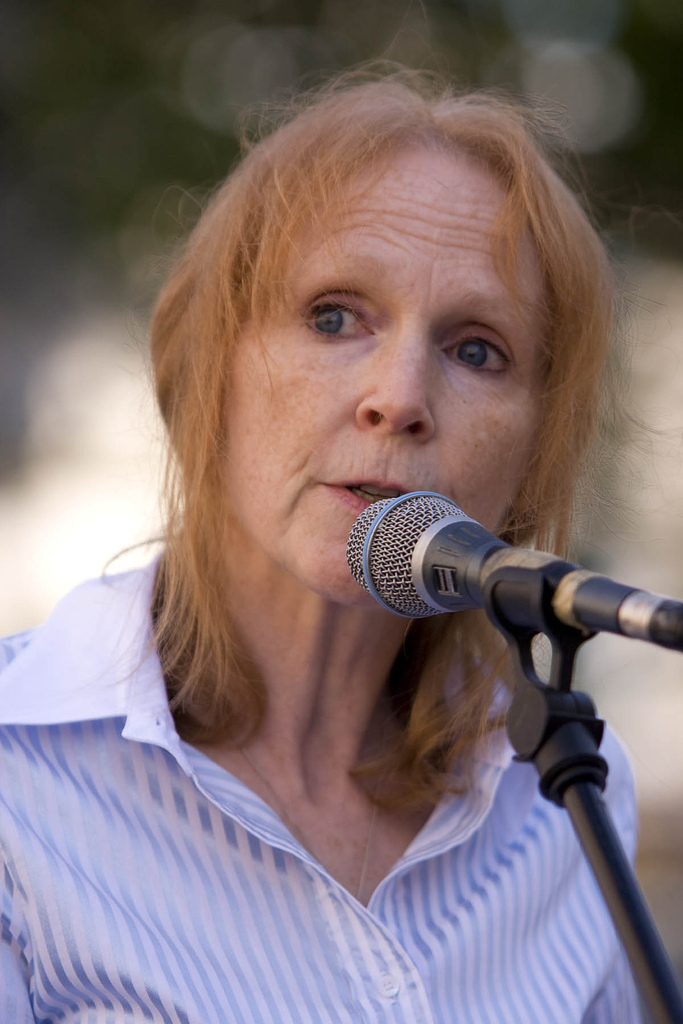
- Sinnott in 2007

Member of the European Parliament
- In office 1 June 2004 – 24 May 2009
- Constituency: South

Personal details
- Born: Kathy Kelly; 29 September 1950 (age 75) Chicago, Illinois, U.S.
- Party: Independent
- Spouse: Declan Sinnott (m. 1980; sep. 2005)
- Children: 9
- Education: Saint Mary-of-the-Woods College; University College Dublin

Kathy Sinnott (née Kelly; born 29 September 1950) is an American-Irish disability rights activist and politician who served as a Member of the European Parliament (MEP) for the South constituency from 2004 to 2009.

== Early life ==
Sinnott was born in Chicago, Illinois, in 1950. She married Irishman Declan Sinnott when they were both aged twenty one. The couple settled in County Cork and have three daughters and six sons together; they are now separated.

== Career ==
She is secretary of the Hope Project, a charity that helps people with disabilities. Sinnott founded the Hope Project in 1996. In 2000, she took a court case to force the Government of Ireland to provide a primary school education for her son Jamie who has multiple disabilities. In 2001, the High Court ruled that every person in Ireland had a constitutional right to free appropriate primary education based on need. The judgment confirmed that this was a fundamental right which was not limited by the availability of resources. The government did not challenge the High Court decision for children 18 years and younger, but successfully appealed its application to persons over 18 years of age in the Supreme Court.

== Public office ==
Sinnott was elected as an MEP for the South constituency at the 2004 European Parliament election. She campaigned on disability, education, anti-abortion, euroscepticism and social conservatism issues.

She had stood previously at the 2002 general election for a seat in the Cork South-Central constituency, and narrowly lost the fifth and final seat to John Dennehy of Fianna Fáil. In the election count, she was initially ahead by 3 votes but lost by 6 votes after two recounts. She was an unsuccessful candidate at the subsequent Seanad Éireann election, after she had been nominated by four sitting independent TDs, losing out by three votes to a Fine Gael candidate. She required a High Court judgment to allow her to run for the Seanad on the Labour Panel.

She is a former co-chair of the European Parliament's Eurosceptic Independence/Democracy group. Sinnott was a member and vice-president of the EUDemocrats – Alliance for a Europe of Democracies.

She was featured in a German TV exposé where MEPs were filmed signing up at 7am for their daily attendance allowance prior to then leaving parliament for the day, in 2008.

On 8 June 2009, Sinnott lost her seat in the European Parliament. She received 30% fewer votes than in the 2004 European Parliament election.

On 21 September 2009, her son Kevin drowned in a swimming accident in the US state of Georgia. He was a final year philosophy student at the Southern Catholic College in Dawsonville, Georgia.

In 2012, Sinnott campaigned against the Children's referendum, claiming it would "lock in" the UN Convention on the Rights of the Child to the Irish Constitution and claiming that a "child is six times more likely to die in care at the hands of the State, than in the care of their parents." Her statistics drew criticism from the Minister Leo Varadkar who labelled them "incredible" and "made up."

In 2015, Sinnott campaigned against the 2015 referendum on same-sex marriage as part of the "First Families First" campaign group, alongside John Waters.

As of 5 November 2016, she is the host of Celtic Connections, a programme on EWTN Radio.
