= Mairead McGuinness =

Irish politician (born 1959)

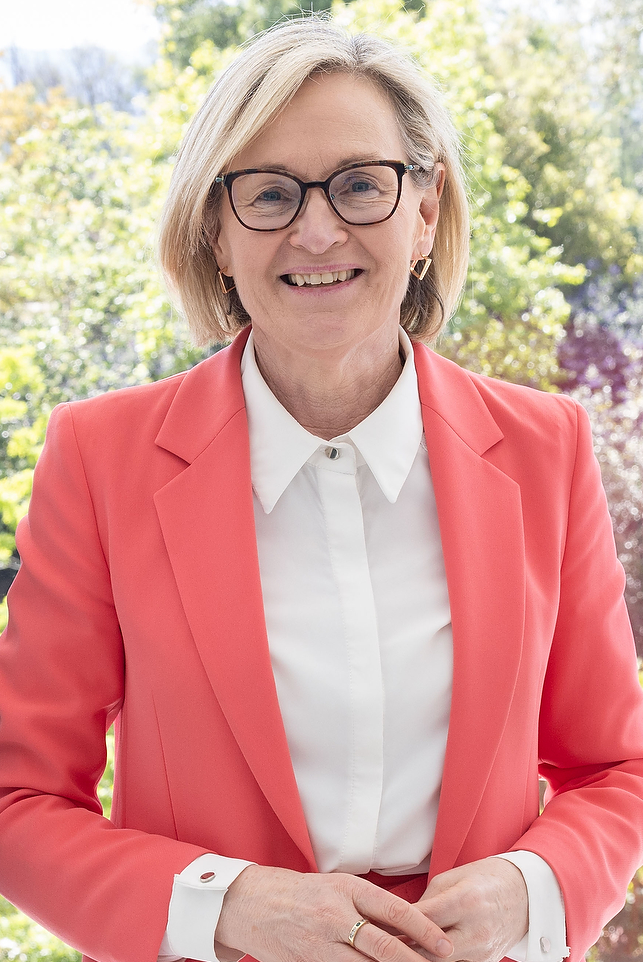
- McGuinness in 2024

European Commissioner for Financial Stability, Financial Services and the Capital Markets Union
- In office 12 October 2020 – 30 November 2024
- Commission: Von der Leyen I
- Preceded by: Valdis Dombrovskis
- Succeeded by: Maria Luís Albuquerque

First Vice-President of the European Parliament
- In office 18 January 2017 – 12 October 2020
- President: Antonio Tajani; David Sassoli
- Preceded by: Antonio Tajani
- Succeeded by: Roberta Metsola

Member of the European Parliament
- In office 1 July 2014 – 12 October 2020
- Constituency: Midlands–North-West
- In office 1 July 2004 – 1 July 2014
- Constituency: East

Personal details
- Born: 13 June 1959 (age 67) Drogheda, County Louth, Ireland
- Party: Fine Gael
- Other political affiliations: European People's Party
- Spouse: Tom Duff (m. 1994)
- Children: 4
- Education: University College Dublin
- Website: Official website

Video-Introduction

Mairead McGuinness (born 13 June 1959) is an Irish politician who served as the European Commissioner for Financial Stability, Financial Services and the Capital Markets Union from October 2020 to November 2024. A member of Fine Gael, she previously served as First Vice-President of the European Parliament from 2017 to 2020. She served as a Member of the European Parliament (MEP) for East from 2004 to 2014 and for Midlands–North-West from 2014 to 2020. In the European Parliament, she sat with the European People's Party (EPP). She was selected as Fine Gael's nominee for the 2025 Irish presidential election after being nominated unopposed but she withdrew from the race following medical advice after a hospital stay.

== Education and media career ==
Originally from Ardee in County Louth, McGuinness was the first female graduate of University College Dublin's Bachelor of Science degree in Agricultural economics in 1980. In 1984, she completed a diploma in accounting and finance and followed a career in the media before entering politics in 2004. She worked as a researcher on The Late Late Show, as a presenter on RTÉ's Ear to the Ground and Celebrity Farm, a journalist with the Irish Farmers Journal and editor of the Irish Independent's agricultural supplement.

In 2014, McGuinness was awarded UCD Alumnus of the Year for Agriculture and Food Science.

== Political career ==
=== Member of the European Parliament, 2004–2020 ===
In early 2004, McGuinness declared her intention to seek a nomination for the European Parliament election for Fine Gael, following speculation linking her to running for the Progressive Democrats. At the selection convention in February 2004, she was selected to run alongside Avril Doyle. This proved controversial, as Fine Gael insiders believed they could win only one of the three seats in the East constituency. However, a stronger than expected performance from Fine Gael in the election saw both women being elected.

During her time in parliament, McGuinness served on several European Parliament committees, including the Committee on Agriculture and Rural Development and the delegation for relations with Australia and New Zealand. She was a substitute member of the Committee on the Environment, Public Health and Food Safety, the Committee on Petitions and the delegation for relations with China.

McGuiness was a Fine Gael candidate for the Louth constituency at the 2007 general election, but was not elected. She was re-elected on the first count at the 2009 European election, topping the poll with 25.7% of the first preference votes.

In April 2011, McGuinness announced that she wished to run for President of Ireland and would seek the Fine Gael party nomination for the 2011 presidential election. During the campaign, McGuinness refused to reveal her MEP expense and allowance claims. In July 2011, she was defeated for the nomination by Gay Mitchell.

At the 2014 European election, she was re-elected to the European Parliament for the new Midlands–North-West constituency.

In July 2014, McGuinness was elected Vice-President of the European Parliament; she secured an absolute majority to go through in the first round of voting by secret ballot. Under the leadership of President Martin Schulz, she oversaw the parliament's information policy, press and citizens relations. In addition, she served as chairwoman of the Working Group on Information and Communication Policy and as co-chair of the Inter-Institutional Group on Communication.

In addition to her committee assignments and duties as vice-president, McGuinness was a member of the European Parliament Intergroup on the Welfare and Conservation of Animals and the European Parliament Intergroup on Children's Rights. Alongside Karin Kadenbach, she also co-chaired the MEP Heart Group, a group of parliamentarians who have an interest in promoting measures that will help reduce the burden of cardiovascular diseases (CVD). In November 2016, One Voice For Languages welcomed McGuinness as their patron.

Also in November 2016, McGuinness officially announced her candidacy for the office of President of the European Parliament. Instead, Italian MEP and former European Commissioner Antonio Tajani was elected as the EPP group's nominee to replace incumbent president Martin Schulz; McGuinness received the second highest number of votes. Ahead of the 2019 European elections, she announced to run again for the post and was re-elected, exceeding the quota on the first count.

Following the 2019 elections, McGuiness was part of a cross-party working group in charge of drafting the European Parliament's four-year work program on digitization.

=== European Commissioner, 2020–2024 ===
McGuinness was one of two people, along with Andrew McDowell, who the Irish government nominated on 4 September 2020 for one position on the European Commission to replace Phil Hogan. On 8 September 2020, McGuinness was proposed by European Commission president Ursula von der Leyen as the new Commissioner for Financial Stability, Financial Services and Capital Markets Union. On 7 October 2020, she was confirmed to the post by a vote of 583–75 with 37 abstentions.

In November 2023, McGuinness announced she would not contest the 2024 European Parliament elections.

=== 2025 presidential election ===
On 15 July 2025, Fine Gael confirmed McGuinness was the party's sole nominee for the 2025 Irish presidential election and was selected unopposed. She was to be ratified at a party event in September.

On 14 August 2025, she withdrew from the presidential race based on medical advice.

== Other activities ==
- European Forum Alpbach, Co-Chair of the Strategic Advisory Council (since 2024)
- Friends of Europe, Member of the Board of Trustees (since 2020)

== Political positions ==
In 2020, Politico quoted an unnamed European People's Party official in describing McGuinness as "more conservative than what she seems to be. Her conservatism stems from her strong Catholic faith, her defence of family values and attachment to traditional Christian democratic values", while another EPP official described her as a "Christian democrat with a social conscience". The same Politico article noted that McGuinness had pushed for the expulsion of Viktor Orbán's Fidesz party from the EPP in 2019.

In May 2018, following several weeks in which she avoided publicly stating her stance, McGuinness announced she would be supporting the Yes vote in the 2018 referendum to legalise abortion in Ireland. The Irish Independent described McGuinness as one of the last members of Fine Gael to clarify their position on the matter. McGuinness stated: "I listened carefully to the debate on the constitutional amendment. Like many undecided voters, I have taken time to reflect on the many different voices and to discuss this important issue with family, friends and constituents. While some of the public debate has been divisive and acrimonious, I have found my discussions deep and searching, with a desire by voters to do what they believe is the right thing for pregnant women and their babies, and the wider societal issues around abortion. People are genuinely torn on the issue".

In 2019, McGuinness authored a report that proposed more direct meetings between religious associations and the European Parliament’s rapporteurs. The proposal was shelved after a group of MEPs complained that it would create "a highly undesirable and untransparent privileged lobby channel for religious organisations".

== Personal life ==
McGuinness is married to Tom Duff, a sheep farmer. The couple have four children.

McGuinness and her husband own two investment properties in Co. Meath, purchased in 2014 and 2016.

Political offices
Preceded by Phil Hogan	Irish European Commissioner; 2020–2024	Succeeded by Michael McGrath
