= 2014 European Parliament election in Ireland =

- 23 May 2014

All 11 Irish seats to the European Parliament
- Turnout: 1,701,942 (52.4% ▼5.2 pp)
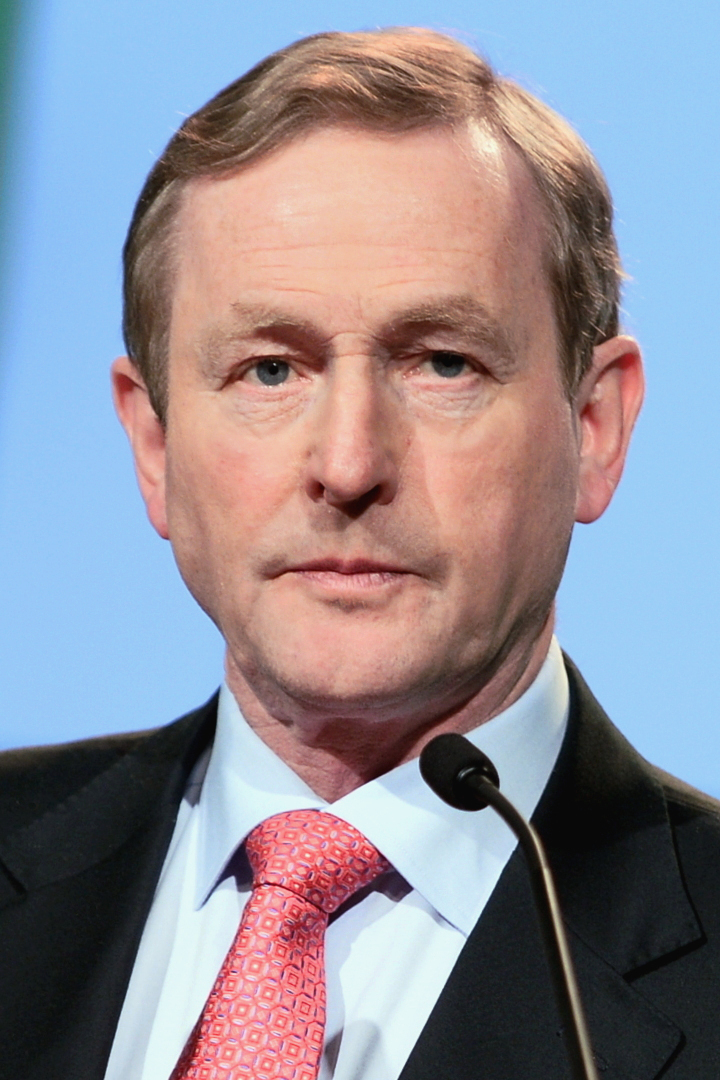

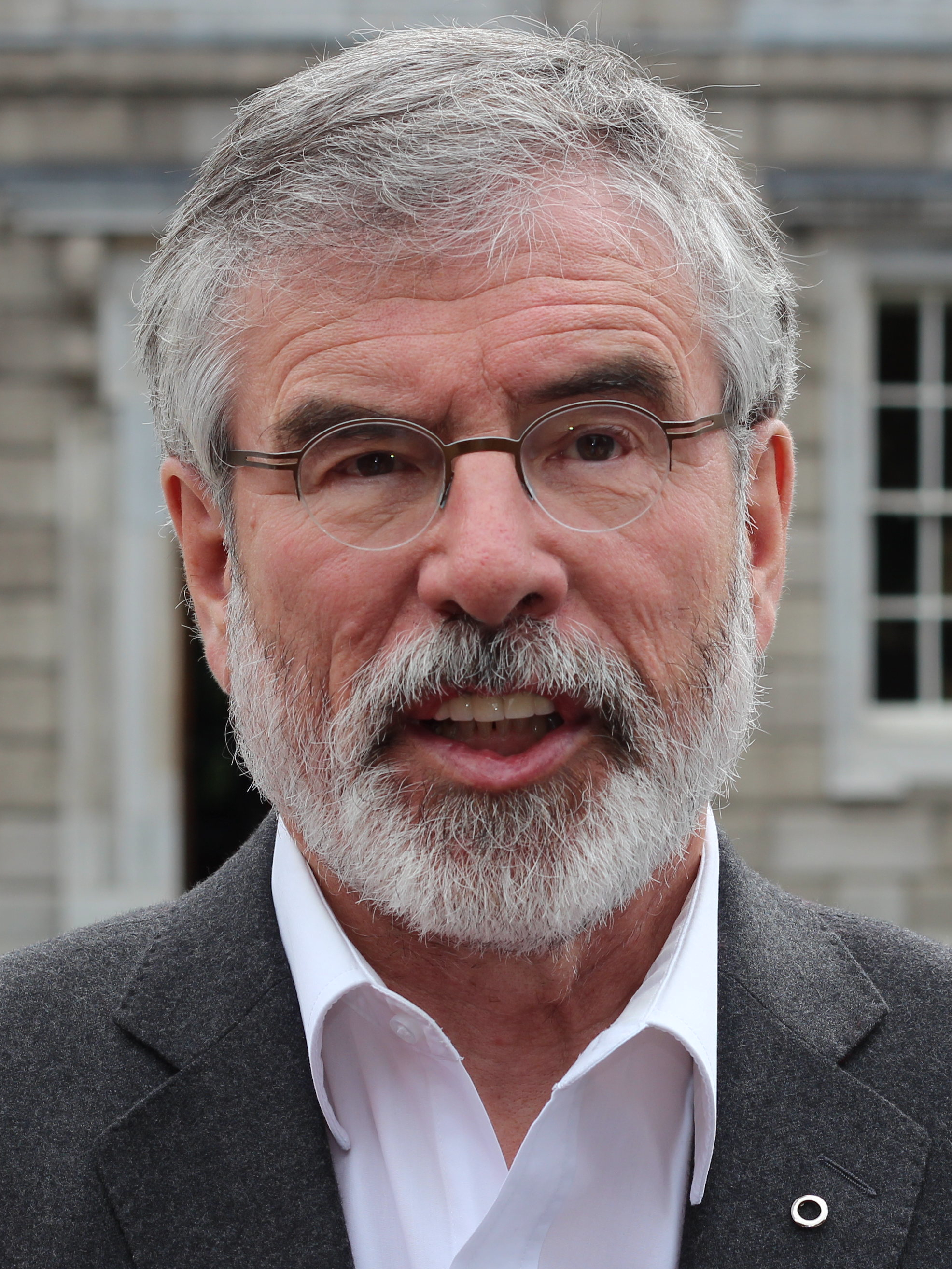

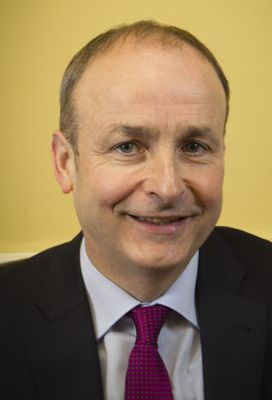

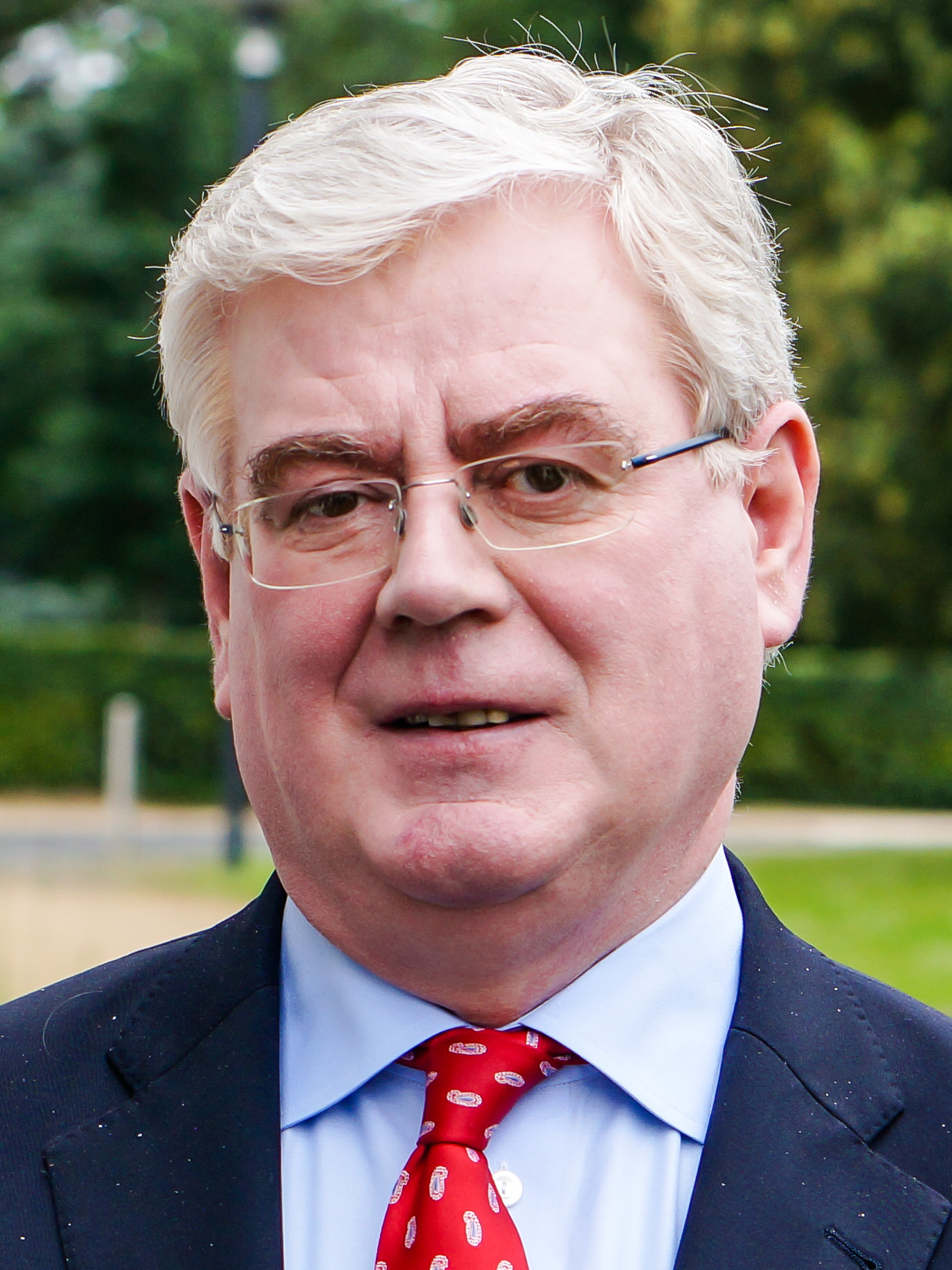

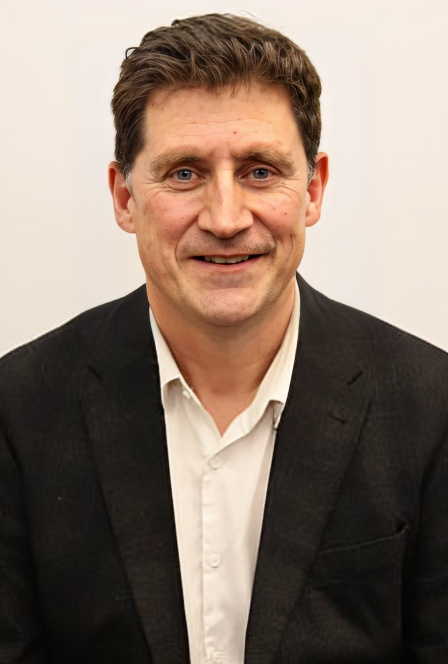

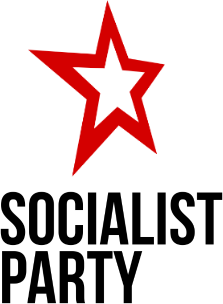
| | First party | Second party | Third party |
|---|---|---|---|
| Leader | Enda Kenny | Gerry Adams | Micheál Martin |
| Party | Fine Gael | Sinn Féin | Fianna Fáil |
| Alliance | EPP | GUE/NGL | ALDE |
| Last election | 29.1%, 4 seats | 11.2%, 0 seats | 24.1%, 3 seats |
| Seats won | 4 / 11 | 3 / 11 | 1 / 11 |
| Seat change | Steady | ▲3 | ▼2 |
| Popular vote | 369,120 | 323,300 | 369,545 |
| Percentage | 22.3% | 19.5% | 22.3% |
| Swing | ▼6.8 pp | ▲8.3 pp | ▼1.8 pp |
| | Fourth party | Fifth party | Sixth party |
| Leader | Eamon Gilmore | Eamon Ryan | — |
| Party | Labour | Green | Socialist Party |
| Alliance | S&D | Greens/EFA | GUE/NGL |
| Last election | 13.9%, 3 seats | 1.9%, 0 seats | 2.7%, 1 seat |
| Seats won | 0 / 11 | 0 / 11 | 0 / 11 |
| Seat change | ▼3 | Steady | ▼1 |
| Popular vote | 88,229 | 81,458 | 29,953 |
| Percentage | 5.3% | 4.9% | 1.8% |
| Swing | ▼8.6 pp | ▲3.0 pp | ▼0.9 pp |
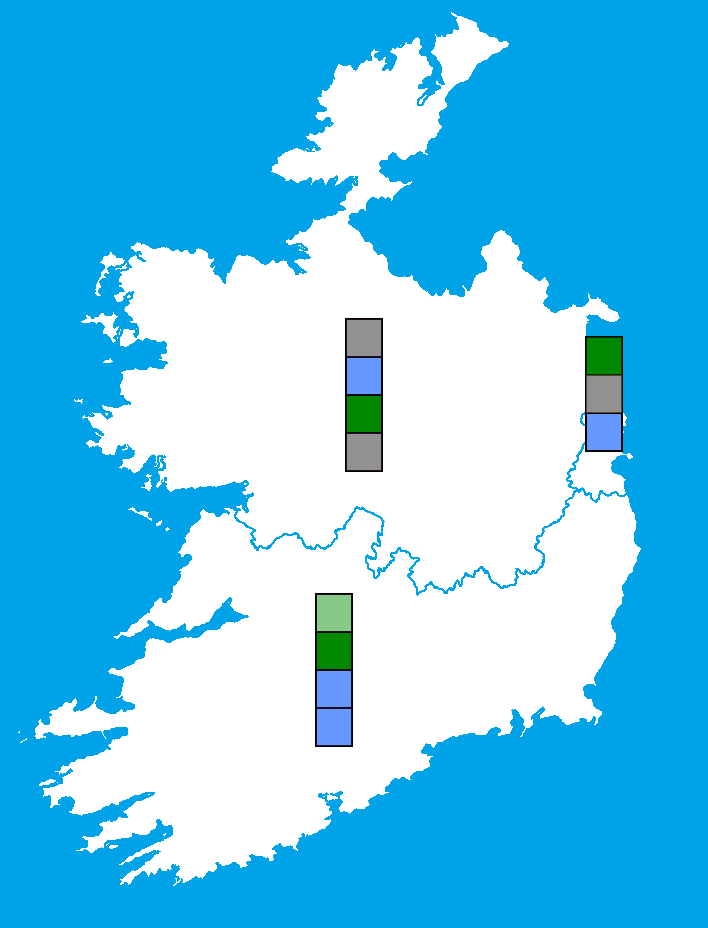

The 2014 European Parliament election in Ireland was the Irish component of the 2014 European Parliament election and was held on Friday, 23 May 2014, on the same day as the 2014 local elections and two by-elections (Dublin West and Longford–Westmeath). The election was conducted under the single transferable vote. Counting of the votes began on Sunday, 25 May and continued until Tuesday, 27 May.

== National and regional summaries ==
In contrast to a poor local election result, Fine Gael retained 4 seats, remaining the largest Irish party at a European level. Despite winning the largest number of first preference votes, Fianna Fáil lost 2 seats – a result of poor candidate selection and a reduction in the number of seats. The Labour Party, bearing the brunt of voter anger with the Coalition government, suffered a meltdown, losing all three of its seats, including its seat in Dublin which it had held since 1989. The Socialist Party also lost its sole seat. The big winners were Sinn Féin and Independents who won three seats each.

In Dublin, Lynn Boylan of Sinn Féin topped the poll and a tight four-way battle for the remaining two seats ensued between Brian Hayes of Fine Gael, ex-Labour MEP turned independent Nessa Childers, Fianna Fáil's Mary Fitzpatrick and the Green Party's Eamon Ryan. Hayes and Childers won with Hayes ahead of Ryan at the final count by a margin of 1,200 votes.

In South, both Brian Crowley of Fianna Fáil and Seán Kelly of Fine Gael were re-elected while first time candidate Liadh Ní Riada of Sinn Féin won a seat. The last seat was taken by Fine Gael Senator Deirdre Clune ahead of her party colleague Simon Harris.

In the new Midlands–North-West constituency, independent TD Luke 'Ming' Flanagan topped the poll while Mairead McGuinness of Fine Gael and Sinn Féin's Matt Carthy took the next two seats. Fianna Fáil's two-candidate strategy in the constituency backfired, with sitting MEP Pat "the Cope" Gallagher narrowly losing to independent Marian Harkin. For the first time, Ireland's delegation to the European Parliament had more women than men.

== Constituency changes ==
The Constituency Commission made changes to the constituencies of Ireland so as to reduce the total number of MEPs from 12 to 11, due to the accession of Croatia to the European Union.

The North-West and East constituencies were abolished. A new 4-seat constituency called Midlands–North-West was created. It comprised all the area of the previous North-West constituency, with the exception of County Clare which was moved to the South constituency; as well as the north Leinster part of the East constituency.

The South constituency was increased in size by the addition of counties Carlow, Clare, Kilkenny, Wexford and Wicklow. and the number of seats increased from 3 to 4.

There were no changes to the Dublin constituency.

== Opinion polls ==
=== Candidate polling ===
==== Dublin ====
| Date | Polling agency | Sample size | Boylan (SF) | Hayes (FG) | Childers (Ind) | Fitzpatrick (FF) | Costello (Lab) | Ryan (GP) | Smith (PBPA) | Murphy (SP) | Tallon (Ind) | Darcy (DDI) | Whitehead (DDI) | Wise (FN) |
|---|---|---|---|---|---|---|---|---|---|---|---|---|---|---|
| 26–28 April | MillwardBrown/Sunday Independent | 500 | 20% | 15% | 19% | 13% | 12% | 11% | 5% | 4% | – | 1% | – | – |
| 1–2 May | RedC/Sunday Business Post | 500 | 15% | 18% | 10% | 13% | 13% | 12% | 9% | 7% | 2% | 1% | 1% | 0% |
| 13–14 May | MillwardBrown/Sunday Independent | 500 | 23% | 22% | 13% | 11% | 10% | 7% | 6% | 7% | – | 1% | – | – |
| 3–15 May | Behaviour & Attitudes/Sunday Times | 500 | 19% | 16% | 11% | 12% | 7% | 11% | 10% | 9% | 3% | 0% | 1% | 1% |
| 23 May | Behaviour & Attitudes/RTÉ Exit Poll | 1000 | 24% | 14% | 11% | 12% | 8% | 14% | 6% | 7% | 1% | 1% | 1% | 0% |

==== Midlands–North-West ====
| Date | Polling agency | Sample size | Carthy (SF) | Byrne (FF) | Flanagan (Ind) | Gallagher (FF) | Harkin (Ind) | Higgins J. (FG) | McGuinness (FG) | Higgins L. (Lab) | Mullen (Ind) | Dearey (GP) | Fitzsimons (Ind) | Gilroy (DDI) | Nic Fhearra (FN) | Fay (Ind) |
|---|---|---|---|---|---|---|---|---|---|---|---|---|---|---|---|---|
| 26–28 April | MillwardBrown/Sunday Independent | 500 | 17% | 16% | 12% | 9% | 12% | 11% | 11% | 4% | 3% | 2% | 3% | 1% | – | – |
| 1–2 May | RedC/Sunday Business Post | 500 | 14% | 8% | 14% | 9% | 16% | 10% | 16% | 5% | 6% | 2% | 0% | 0% | 0% | – |
| 13–14 May | MillwardBrown/Irish Independent | 500 | 19% | 9% | 15% | 10% | 12% | 6% | 13% | 5% | 5% | 3% | 1% | 1% | 0% | 0% |
| 3–15 May | Behaviour & Attitudes/Sunday Times | 500 | 14% | 9% | 17% | 8% | 12% | 7% | 21% | 5% | 5% | 1% | 0% | 1% | 0% | 0% |
| 23 May | Behaviour & Attitudes/RTÉ Exit Poll | 1000 | 13% | 10% | 20% | 11% | 11% | 7% | 16% | 4% | 4% | 2% | 0% | 1% | 0% | 1% |

==== South ====
| Date | Polling agency | Sample size | Crowley (FF) | Ní Riada (SF) | Kelly (FG) | Clune (FG) | Harris (FG) | Prendergast (Lab) | O'Flynn (Ind) | Godsil (Ind) | Hartley (FF) | O'Sullivan (GP) | Van De Ven (DDI) | O'Riordan (FN) | Cahill (Ind) | Heaney (CD) |
|---|---|---|---|---|---|---|---|---|---|---|---|---|---|---|---|---|
| 26–28 April | MillwardBrown/Sunday Independent | 500 | 36% | 15% | 12% | 12% | 7% | 4% | 7% | 3% | 2% | 1% | 1% | – | 0% | 0% |
| 1–2 May | RedC/Sunday Business Post | 500 | 28% | 14% | 18% | 8% | 7% | 9% | 4% | 3% | 3% | 6% | 1% | 0% | – | – |
| 13–14 May | MillwardBrown/Irish Independent | 500 | 32% | 16% | 15% | 10% | 9% | 6% | 4% | 2% | 2% | 4% | 0% | 0% | 0% | 0% |
| 3–15 May | Behaviour & Attitudes/Sunday Times | 500 | 35% | 14% | 17% | 10% | 8% | 5% | 2% | 2% | 1% | 3% | 1% | 0% | 2% | 1% |
| 23 May | Behaviour & Attitudes/RTÉ Exit Poll | 1000 | 26% | 17% | 12% | 9% | 7% | 5% | 5% | 1% | 5% | 5% | 1% | 1% | 3% | 1% |

=== Party polling ===
The figures are for first-preference votes, as STV is a ranked voting system.

==== Dublin ====
| Date | Source | Polling agency | Fine Gael | Labour | Fianna Fáil | Sinn Féin | Socialist | Green | PBP | Others |
|---|---|---|---|---|---|---|---|---|---|---|
| 28 April 2014 | Sunday Independent | MillwardBrown | 15% | 12% | 13% | 20% | 4% | 11% | 5% | 20% |
| 2 May 2014 | Sunday Business Post | RedC | 18% | 13% | 13% | 15% | 7% | 12% | 9% | 14% |
| 14 May 2014 | Sunday Independent | MillwardBrown | 22% | 10% | 11% | 23% | 7% | 7% | 6% | 14% |
| 14 May 2014 | The Sunday Times | Behaviour & Attitudes | 16% | 7% | 12% | 19% | 9% | 11% | 10% | 16% |

==== Midlands–North-West ====
| Date | Source | Polling agency | Fine Gael | Labour | Fianna Fáil | Sinn Féin | Green | Others |
|---|---|---|---|---|---|---|---|---|
| 28 April 2014 | Sunday Independent | MillwardBrown | 22% | 4% | 25% | 17% | 2% | 30% |
| 2 May 2014 | Sunday Business Post | RedC | 26% | 5% | 17% | 14% | 2% | 36% |
| 14 May 2014 | Sunday Independent | MillwardBrown | 19% | 5% | 19% | 19% | 3% | 34% |
| 14 May 2014 | The Sunday Times | Behaviour & Attitudes | 28% | 5% | 17% | 14% | 4% | 35% |

==== South ====
| Date | Source | Polling agency | Fine Gael | Labour | Fianna Fáil | Sinn Féin | Green | Others |
|---|---|---|---|---|---|---|---|---|
| 28 April 2014 | Sunday Independent | MillwardBrown | 30% | 4% | 39% | 15% | 1% | 11% |
| 2 May 2014 | Sunday Business Post | RedC | 33% | 9% | 31% | 14% | 6% | 8% |
| 14 May 2014 | Sunday Independent | MillwardBrown | 34% | 6% | 34% | 16% | 4% | 6% |
| 14 May 2014 | The Sunday Times | Behaviour & Attitudes | 35% | 5% | 36% | 14% | 3% | 8% |

== Results ==
2014–2019 European Parliament Ireland constituencies

| Party | Votes | % | +/– | Seats | +/– |
|---|---|---|---|---|---|
| Fianna Fáil | 369,545 | 22.31 | +1.8 | 1 | −2 |
| Fine Gael | 369,120 | 22.28 | −6.8 | 4 | 0 |
| Sinn Féin | 323,300 | 19.52 | +8.3 | 3 | +3 |
| Labour Party | 88,229 | 5.33 | −8.6 | 0 | −3 |
| Green Party | 81,458 | 4.92 | +3.0 | 0 | 0 |
| Socialist Party | 29,953 | 1.81 | −0.9 | 0 | −1 |
| Direct Democracy Ireland | 24,093 | 1.45 | New | 0 | New |
| People Before Profit Alliance | 23,875 | 1.44 | New | 0 | New |
| Catholic Democrats | 13,569 | 0.82 | New | 0 | New |
| Fís Nua | 4,610 | 0.28 | New | 0 | New |
| Independent | 328,766 | 19.85 | +8.3 | 3 | +2 |
| Total | 1,656,518 | 100.00 | – | 11 | −1 |
| Valid votes | 1,656,518 | 97.33 | | | |
| Invalid/blank votes | 45,424 | 2.67 | | | |
| Total votes | 1,701,942 | 100.00 | | | |
| Registered voters/turnout | 3,245,348 | 52.44 | | | |
Source: ElectionsIreland.org

=== Post-Poll Alliance ===
| EPP | S&D | ECR | ALDE | GUE/NGL | G-EFA | EFDD | NI | (Republic of Ireland) Total |
|---|---|---|---|---|---|---|---|---|
| 4 (FG) | 1 (Childers) | 1 (FF/Crowley) | 1 (Harkin) | 3 (SF); 1 (Flanagan) | | | | 11 |

=== Voting details ===
| Constituency | Electorate | Turnout | Spoilt | Valid Poll | Quota | Seats | Electorate per Seat | Candidates |
|---|---|---|---|---|---|---|---|---|
| Dublin | 820,668 | 358,943 | 6,368 | 352,575 | 88,144 | 3 | 273,556 | 12 |
| Midlands–North-West | 1,202,997 | 663,703 | 17,258 | 646,445 | 129,290 | 4 | 300,749 | 14 |
| South | 1,221,683 | 679,296 | 21,798 | 657,498 | 131,500 | 4 | 305,420 | 15 |
| Total | 3,245,348 | 1,701,942 | 45,424 | 1,656,518 | — | 11 | 31 | |

== See also ==
- 2014 Northern Ireland constituency result
