= 27th Dáil =

TDs from 1992 to 1997

←	26th Dáil	28th Dáil	→

Overview
- Legislative body: Dáil Éireann
- Jurisdiction: Ireland
- Meeting place: Leinster House
- Term: 14 December 1992 – 15 May 1997
- Election: 1992 general election
- Government: 23rd government of Ireland (1993–1994); 24th government of Ireland (1994–1997)
- Members: 166
- Ceann Comhairle: Seán Treacy
- Taoiseach: John Bruton — Albert Reynolds until 15 December 1994
- Tánaiste: Dick Spring — Bertie Ahern until 15 December 1994 — Dick Spring until 17 November 1994 — John Wilson until 12 January 1993
- Chief Whip: Jim Higgins — Seán Barrett until 23 May 1995 — Noel Dempsey until 15 December 1994
- Leader of the Opposition: Bertie Ahern — John Bruton until 15 December 1994

Sessions
- 1st: 14 December 1992 – 21 July 1993
- 2nd: 20 September 1993 – 1 July 1994
- 3rd: 25 August 1994 – 26 July 1995
- 4th: 20 September 1995 – 25 July 1996
- 5th: 25 September 1996 – 15 May 1997

The 27th Dáil was elected at the 1992 general election on 25 November 1992 and met on 14 December 1992. The members of Dáil Éireann, the house of representatives of the Oireachtas (legislature) of Ireland, are known as TDs. It sat with the 20th Seanad as the two Houses of the Oireachtas.

The 27th Dáil saw a change of Taoiseach from Albert Reynolds to John Bruton in December 1994, the only time there was a new Taoiseach with a change in the party composition of the government during a Dáil term. The 27th Dáil was dissolved by President Mary Robinson on 15 May 1997, at the request of the Taoiseach, John Bruton. The 27th Dáil lasted 4 years, 152 days.

== Composition of the 27th Dáil ==
- 23rd government (1993–1994) coalition parties
- Rainbow Coalition (24th government) (1994–1997) parties

Party	Nov. 1992	May 1997	Change
Fianna Fáil	68	68	Steady
Fine Gael	45	47	▲2
Labour	33	32	▼1
Progressive Democrats	10	8	▼2
Democratic Left	4	6	▲2
Green	1	1	Steady
Independent Fianna Fáil	1	0	▼1
Independent	4	3	▼1
Ceann Comhairle	—N/a	1	▲1
Total	166		

Fianna Fáil and the Labour Party formed the 23rd government of Ireland, with Albert Reynolds as the Taoiseach. When the government collapsed in 1994, the 24th government was formed by a coalition of Labour, Democratic Left and Fine Gael, with John Bruton as Taoiseach.

=== Graphical representation ===
This is a graphical comparison of party strengths in the 27th Dáil from January 1993. This was not the official seating plan.

== Ceann Comhairle ==
On 14 December 1992, Seán Treacy (Ind) was proposed by Albert Reynolds and seconded by John Bruton for the position of Ceann Comhairle. Treacy was approved without a vote. On 23 April 1997, Treacy announced to the Dáil that would not be availing of his constitutional right to automatic re-election to the 28th Dáil.

== TDs by constituency ==
The list of the 166 TDs elected is given in alphabetical order by Dáil constituency.

Members of the 27th Dáil
Constituency	Name	Party
Carlow–Kilkenny	Liam Aylward	Fianna Fáil
Carlow–Kilkenny	John Browne	Fine Gael
Carlow–Kilkenny	Phil Hogan	Fine Gael
Carlow–Kilkenny	M. J. Nolan	Fianna Fáil
Carlow–Kilkenny	Séamus Pattison	Labour
Cavan–Monaghan	Andrew Boylan	Fine Gael
Cavan–Monaghan	Seymour Crawford	Fine Gael
Cavan–Monaghan	Jimmy Leonard	Fianna Fáil
Cavan–Monaghan	Rory O'Hanlon	Fianna Fáil
Cavan–Monaghan	Brendan Smith	Fianna Fáil
Clare	Moosajee Bhamjee	Labour
Clare	Donal Carey	Fine Gael
Clare	Síle de Valera	Fianna Fáil
Clare	Tony Killeen	Fianna Fáil
Cork East	Michael Ahern	Fianna Fáil
Cork East	Paul Bradford	Fine Gael
Cork East	Ned O'Keeffe	Fianna Fáil
Cork East	John Mulvihill	Labour
Cork North-Central	Bernard Allen	Fine Gael
Cork North-Central	Liam Burke	Fine Gael
Cork North-Central	Gerry O'Sullivan	Labour
Cork North-Central	Máirín Quill	Progressive Democrats
Cork North-Central	Dan Wallace	Fianna Fáil
Cork North-West	Michael Creed	Fine Gael
Cork North-West	Donal Moynihan	Fianna Fáil
Cork North-West	Frank Crowley	Fine Gael
Cork South-Central	Peter Barry	Fine Gael
Cork South-Central	Pat Cox	Progressive Democrats
Cork South-Central	Micheál Martin	Fianna Fáil
Cork South-Central	Batt O'Keeffe	Fianna Fáil
Cork South-Central	Toddy O'Sullivan	Labour
Cork South-West	Jim O'Keeffe	Fine Gael
Cork South-West	P. J. Sheehan	Fine Gael
Cork South-West	Joe Walsh	Fianna Fáil
Donegal North-East	Neil Blaney	Independent Fianna Fáil
Donegal North-East	Paddy Harte	Fine Gael
Donegal North-East	Jim McDaid	Fianna Fáil
Donegal South-West	Mary Coughlan	Fianna Fáil
Donegal South-West	Pat "the Cope" Gallagher	Fianna Fáil
Donegal South-West	Dinny McGinley	Fine Gael
Dublin Central	Bertie Ahern	Fianna Fáil
Dublin Central	Joe Costello	Labour
Dublin Central	Tony Gregory	Independent
Dublin Central	Jim Mitchell	Fine Gael
Dublin North	Ray Burke	Fianna Fáil
Dublin North	Nora Owen	Fine Gael
Dublin North	Seán Ryan	Labour
Dublin North	Trevor Sargent	Green
Dublin North-Central	Richard Bruton	Fine Gael
Dublin North-Central	Ivor Callely	Fianna Fáil
Dublin North-Central	Seán Haughey	Fianna Fáil
Dublin North-Central	Derek McDowell	Labour
Dublin North-East	Tommy Broughan	Labour
Dublin North-East	Liam Fitzgerald	Fianna Fáil
Dublin North-East	Seán Kenny	Labour
Dublin North-East	Michael Woods	Fianna Fáil
Dublin North-West	Noel Ahern	Fianna Fáil
Dublin North-West	Mary Flaherty	Fine Gael
Dublin North-West	Proinsias De Rossa	Democratic Left
Dublin North-West	Róisín Shortall	Labour
Dublin South	Séamus Brennan	Fianna Fáil
Dublin South	Eithne FitzGerald	Labour
Dublin South	Tom Kitt	Fianna Fáil
Dublin South	Liz O'Donnell	Progressive Democrats
Dublin South	Alan Shatter	Fine Gael
Dublin South-Central	Ben Briscoe	Fianna Fáil
Dublin South-Central	Gay Mitchell	Fine Gael
Dublin South-Central	John O'Connell	Fianna Fáil
Dublin South-Central	Pat Upton	Labour
Dublin South-East	Frances Fitzgerald	Fine Gael
Dublin South-East	Michael McDowell	Progressive Democrats
Dublin South-East	Ruairi Quinn	Labour
Dublin South-East	Eoin Ryan	Fianna Fáil
Dublin South-West	Chris Flood	Fianna Fáil
Dublin South-West	Mary Harney	Progressive Democrats
Dublin South-West	Pat Rabbitte	Democratic Left
Dublin South-West	Mervyn Taylor	Labour
Dublin South-West	Éamonn Walsh	Labour
Dublin West	Austin Currie	Fine Gael
Dublin West	Joan Burton	Labour
Dublin West	Liam Lawlor	Fianna Fáil
Dublin West	Brian Lenihan Snr	Fianna Fáil
Dún Laoghaire	David Andrews	Fianna Fáil
Dún Laoghaire	Seán Barrett	Fine Gael
Dún Laoghaire	Niamh Bhreathnach	Labour
Dún Laoghaire	Eamon Gilmore	Democratic Left
Dún Laoghaire	Helen Keogh	Progressive Democrats
Galway East	Paul Connaughton Snr	Fine Gael
Galway East	Michael P. Kitt	Fianna Fáil
Galway East	Noel Treacy	Fianna Fáil
Galway West	Máire Geoghegan-Quinn	Fianna Fáil
Galway West	Michael D. Higgins	Labour
Galway West	Pádraic McCormack	Fine Gael
Galway West	Bobby Molloy	Progressive Democrats
Galway West	Éamon Ó Cuív	Fianna Fáil
Kerry North	Jimmy Deenihan	Fine Gael
Kerry North	Denis Foley	Fianna Fáil
Kerry North	Dick Spring	Labour
Kerry South	Breeda Moynihan-Cronin	Labour
Kerry South	John O'Donoghue	Fianna Fáil
Kerry South	John O'Leary	Fianna Fáil
Kildare	Alan Dukes	Fine Gael
Kildare	Bernard Durkan	Fine Gael
Kildare	Charlie McCreevy	Fianna Fáil
Kildare	Seán Power	Fianna Fáil
Kildare	Emmet Stagg	Labour
Laois–Offaly	Ger Connolly	Fianna Fáil
Laois–Offaly	Brian Cowen	Fianna Fáil
Laois–Offaly	Charles Flanagan	Fine Gael
Laois–Offaly	Pat Gallagher	Labour
Laois–Offaly	Liam Hyland	Fianna Fáil
Limerick East	Peadar Clohessy	Progressive Democrats
Limerick East	Jim Kemmy	Labour
Limerick East	Michael Noonan	Fine Gael
Limerick East	Willie O'Dea	Fianna Fáil
Limerick East	Desmond O'Malley	Progressive Democrats
Limerick West	Gerry Collins	Fianna Fáil
Limerick West	Michael Finucane	Fine Gael
Limerick West	Michael J. Noonan	Fianna Fáil
Longford–Roscommon	John Connor	Fine Gael
Longford–Roscommon	Seán Doherty	Fianna Fáil
Longford–Roscommon	Tom Foxe	Independent
Longford–Roscommon	Albert Reynolds	Fianna Fáil
Louth	Dermot Ahern	Fianna Fáil
Louth	Michael Bell	Labour
Louth	Séamus Kirk	Fianna Fáil
Louth	Brendan McGahon	Fine Gael
Mayo East	Jim Higgins	Fine Gael
Mayo East	Tom Moffatt	Fianna Fáil
Mayo East	P. J. Morley	Fianna Fáil
Mayo West	Pádraig Flynn	Fianna Fáil
Mayo West	Enda Kenny	Fine Gael
Mayo West	Séamus Hughes	Fianna Fáil
Meath	John Bruton	Fine Gael
Meath	Noel Dempsey	Fianna Fáil
Meath	Brian Fitzgerald	Labour
Meath	Colm Hilliard	Fianna Fáil
Meath	Mary Wallace	Fianna Fáil
Sligo–Leitrim	Declan Bree	Labour
Sligo–Leitrim	Matt Brennan	Fianna Fáil
Sligo–Leitrim	John Ellis	Fianna Fáil
Sligo–Leitrim	Ted Nealon	Fine Gael
Tipperary North	Michael Lowry	Fine Gael
Tipperary North	John Ryan	Labour
Tipperary North	Michael Smith	Fianna Fáil
Tipperary South	Theresa Ahearn	Fine Gael
Tipperary South	Noel Davern	Fianna Fáil
Tipperary South	Michael Ferris	Labour
Tipperary South	Seán Treacy	Independent
Waterford	Martin Cullen	Progressive Democrats
Waterford	Austin Deasy	Fine Gael
Waterford	Brendan Kenneally	Fianna Fáil
Waterford	Brian O'Shea	Labour
Westmeath	Paul McGrath	Fine Gael
Westmeath	Mary O'Rourke	Fianna Fáil
Westmeath	Willie Penrose	Labour
Wexford	John Browne	Fianna Fáil
Wexford	Hugh Byrne	Fianna Fáil
Wexford	Avril Doyle	Fine Gael
Wexford	Brendan Howlin	Labour
Wexford	Ivan Yates	Fine Gael
Wicklow	Johnny Fox	Independent
Wicklow	Joe Jacob	Fianna Fáil
Wicklow	Liam Kavanagh	Labour
Wicklow	Liz McManus	Democratic Left
Wicklow	Godfrey Timmins	Fine Gael

== Changes ==
Date	Constituency	Loss	Gain	Note
14 December 1992	Tipperary South	Independent	Ceann Comhairle	Seán Treacy takes office as Ceann Comhairle
4 January 1993	Mayo West	Fianna Fáil		Resignation of Pádraig Flynn on nomination as EC Commissioner
24 February 1993	Dublin South-Central	Fianna Fáil		Resignation of John O'Connell
31 March 1993	Limerick West	Fianna Fáil	Independent	Michael J. Noonan loses whip after criticism of party leader and Taoiseach
7 July 1993	Clare	Fianna Fáil	Independent	Síle de Valera resigns from parliamentary party in opposition to government policy on Shannon Airport
7 July 1993	Clare	Fianna Fáil	Independent	Tony Killeen resigns from parliamentary party in opposition to government policy on Shannon Airport
13 May 1994	Cork South-Central	Progressive Democrats	Independent	Pat Cox resigns from PDs to contest the 1994 European Parliament election as an Independent
9 June 1994	Dublin South-Central		Democratic Left	Eric Byrne takes the seat vacated by the resignation of O'Connell
9 June 1994	Mayo West		Fine Gael	Michael Ring takes the seat vacated by the resignation of Flynn
15 June 1994	Clare	Independent	Fianna Fáil	Síle de Valera returns to parliamentary party
15 June 1994	Clare	Independent	Fianna Fáil	Tony Killeen returns to parliamentary party
19 July 1994	Cork South-Central	Independent		Resignation of Pat Cox following his re-election to Munster at the European Parliament election
5 August 1994	Cork North-Central	Labour		Death of Gerry O'Sullivan
5 September 1994	Waterford	Progressive Democrats	Fianna Fáil	Martin Cullen joins Fianna Fáil
10 November 1994	Cork North-Central		Democratic Left	Kathleen Lynch takes the seat vacated by the death of O'Sullivan
10 November 1994	Cork South-Central		Fine Gael	Hugh Coveney takes the seat vacated by the resignation of Pat Cox
18 January 1995	Limerick West	Independent	Fianna Fáil	Whip restored to Michael J. Noonan
17 March 1995	Wicklow	Independent		Death of Johnny Fox
29 June 1995	Wicklow		Independent	Mildred Fox holds the seat vacated by the death of her father Johnny Fox
3 October 1995	Limerick West	Fianna Fáil	Independent	Michael J. Noonan loses whip after abstaining on divorce amendment
1 November 1995	Dublin West	Fianna Fáil		Death of Brian Lenihan Snr
8 November 1995	Donegal North-East	Independent Fianna Fáil		Death of Neil Blaney
2 April 1996	Dublin West		Fianna Fáil	Brian Lenihan Jnr holds the seat vacated by the death of his father Brian Lenihan Snr
2 April 1996	Donegal North-East		Fianna Fáil	Cecilia Keaveney takes the seat vacated by the death of Blaney
14 May 1997	Limerick West	Independent	Fianna Fáil	Whip restored to Michael J. Noonan

On 24 February 1994, Proinsias De Rossa (DL) sought to direct that the writ be moved for the by-elections in Dublin South-Central, and Enda Kenny (FG) sought to direct that the writ be moved for the by-elections in Mayo West. This was opposed by the government. The government moved the writs on 18 May 1994. The by-elections were held at the same date as the European Parliament election and the local elections.
