= 1994 Dublin South-Central by-election =

By-election to the 27th Dáil

- 9 June 1994
- Turnout: 26,775 (43.0%)
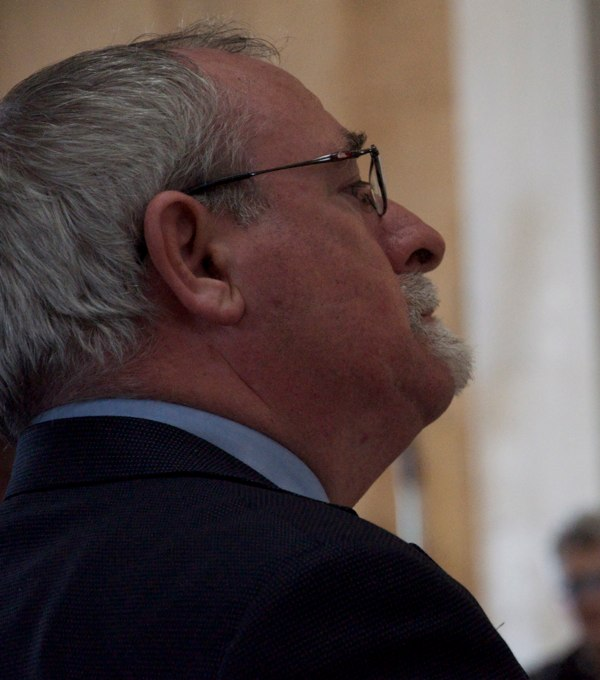

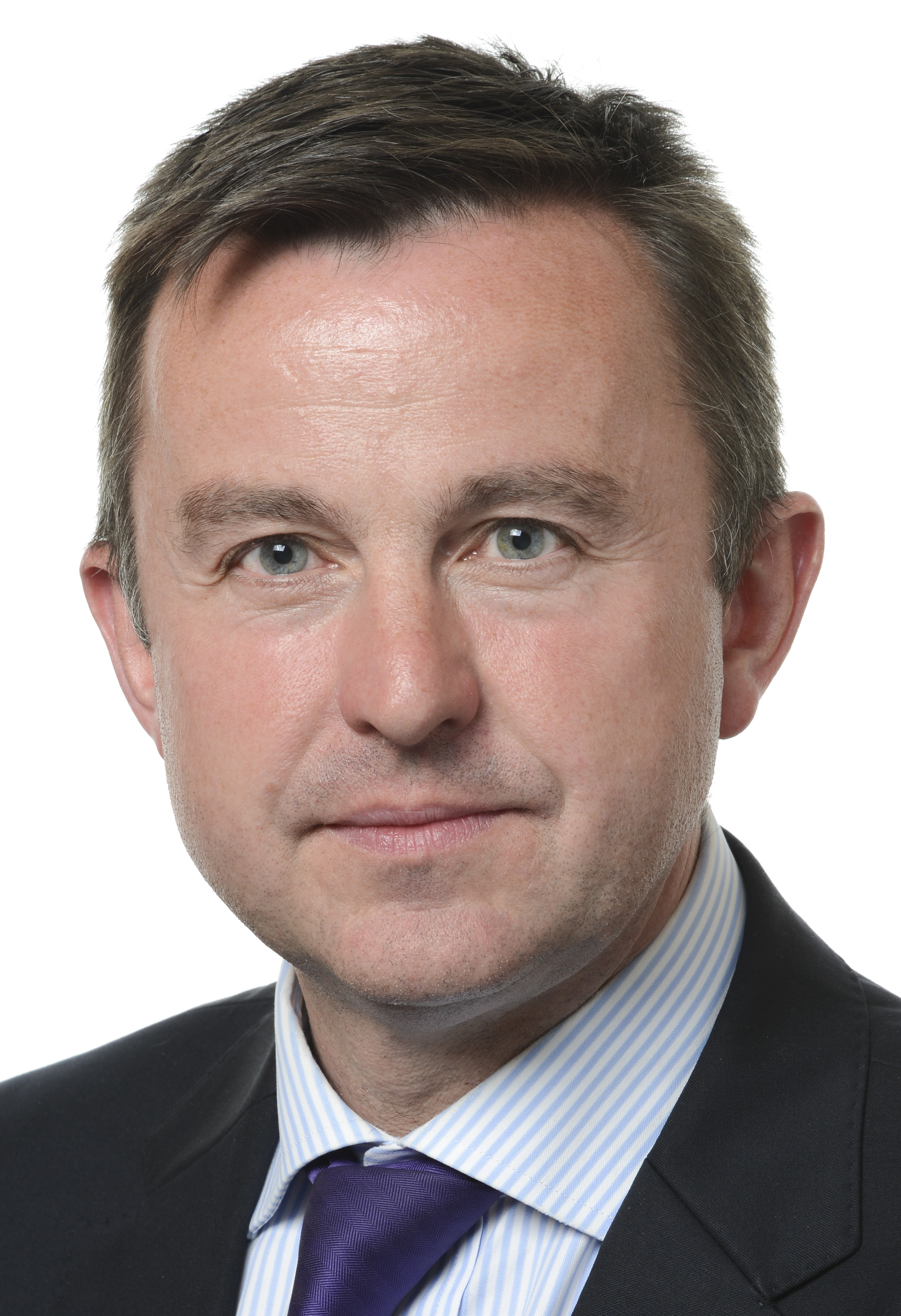
		Mulcahy
Nominee	Eric Byrne	Michael Mulcahy	Brian Hayes
Party	Democratic Left	Fianna Fáil	Fine Gael
First preferences	7,445	5,642	4,637
Percentage	27.8%	21.1%	17.3%
Final count	12,741	8,629	–
TD before election
John O'Connell
Fianna Fáil
TD after election
Eric Byrne
Democratic Left

A Dáil by-election was held in the constituency of Dublin South-Central in Ireland on Thursday, 9 June 1994, to fill a vacancy in the 27th Dáil. It followed the resignation on health grounds of Fianna Fáil Teachta Dála (TD) John O'Connell on 24 February 1993.

The by-election was won by the Democratic Left candidate, Eric Byrne, a member of Dublin City Council who had represented the constituency from 1989 to 1992. This was the first of two occasions that Democratic Left won a by-election.

On the same day, a by-election took place in Mayo West.

== Background ==
On 24 February 1993, Fianna Fáil TD John O'Connell, who had served as Ceann Comhairle and as Minister for Health, resigned as a TD due to ill health. It followed shortly after the vacancy in Mayo West after Fianna Fáil TD Pádraig Flynn had resigned on 4 January prior to his appointment as Ireland's European Commissioner.

Opposition parties initially pushed to hold the by-elections as early as possible. On 28 April 1993, a motion by Democratic Left leader Proinsias De Rossa to issue the writ of election to fill the vacancy (and that in Mayo West), opposed by the Fianna Fáil–Labour Party coalition government, was defeated by 45 to 82. On 24 February 1994, de Rossa moved a second motion to issue the writ, which was defeated by 41 to 66. On 18 May 1994, a government motion to issue the writs was agreed.

It was held on 9 June 1994, the same day as the 1994 European Parliament election, the 1994 local elections, and the 1994 Mayo West by-election. Writing in 1996, Michael Gallagher gave the 470 days between O'Connell's resignation in February 1993 and the date of the by-election as the second-longest interval between the creation of a vacancy and the holding of the resultant by-election, with the 521 days in Mayo West being the longest. They would later be surpassed by the delay of 539 days in holding the 2010 Donegal South-West by-election.

== Candidates ==
=== Democratic Left ===
One of the first candidates to declare their intention to run was Dublin City Councillor and former TD for the constituency Eric Byrne. Byrne was elected at the 1989 general election as a Workers' Party TD. In early 1992, he was one of six Workers' Party TDs to join the new Democratic Left party, and contested the 1992 general election under that label. After a long count, Byrne lost his seat to Fianna Fáil's Ben Briscoe by five votes.

=== Fianna Fáil ===
Initial speculation suggested that some potential Fianna Fáil candidates included the party's third candidate at the last election councillor Michael Mulcahy, thrice unsuccessful Dublin South candidate Ann Ormonde, councillor Seán Ardagh and previous TD for the constituency Mary Mooney. Olympic gold medalist boxer Michael Carruth's name had been floated as a potential high-profile candidate, though Carruth's PR team denied knowledge of any approach to him. In April 1993, it was reported that O'Connell's son, Dr. John O'Connell Jnr., was the most likely nominee, with Ardagh his closest challenger. Nevertheless, Michael Mulcahy was selected as the party's candidate. Dublin Central TD Bertie Ahern was Mulcahy's director of elections.

=== Fine Gael ===
Speculated Fine Gael candidates included Norma Mitchell, wife of sitting TD for the constituency Gay Mitchell, local councillor Stan Laing, former councillor from Rialto Peter Burke, Clondalkin councillor Therese Ridge and former Lord Mayor of Dublin Alexis FitzGerald Jnr. It was reported in April 1993 that former TD for Dún Laoghaire and women's rights activist Monica Barnes would be the front-runner for the nomination. In January 1994, Young Fine Gael member Brian Hayes was selected as Fine Gael's candidate.

=== Labour Party ===
Dublin City Councillor for Rathmines, Mary Freehill, had been suggested as a potential Labour Party candidate for the seat. There had been some suggestion that celebrity psychiatrist Anthony Clare would contest the election for Labour, but sitting TD for the constituency Pat Upton backed local councillor and founder of the Community Games, Joe Connolly. Connolly was selected as the Labour candidate in June.

=== Independents and others ===
In August 1993, Eamonn Gavin stated he would stand as an independent candidate. The main witness in the controversial "Tallaght Two" case, Gavin said he would run as a "law and order" candidate.

In April 1994, councillor Cáit Keane was selected as the Progressive Democrats' candidate for the election. Three candidates from Crumlin ran; librarian John Goodwillie for the Green Party, student Martina Gibney for Sinn Féin and Dublin Corporation foreman Shay Kelly for the Workers' Party. Two other independents stood; businessman Michael Park from Kimmage and perennial candidate Benny Cooney from Athlone in County Westmeath.

== Campaign ==
From the get-go the by-election campaign was expected to be a bitter one, and a test of the incumbent government's approval. Following the raising of property taxes and cutting of tax reliefs in the 1994 budget, the government were expected to take a hit at the polls.

Fianna Fáil pursued a vote-transfer agreement with their cabinet colleagues in Labour for the by-elections here and in Mayo West, though it was believed that Labour activists in the constituency were opposed to a formal vote arrangement. Two days before the election, Tánaiste and Labour Party leader Dick Spring rejected calls for a voting pact between the two parties.

Fine Gael candidate Brian Hayes was noted to have produced a leaflet with a picture Dick Spring with the caption "Tricky Dicky", asking "Would you buy a used car from this man?", an allusion to a poster regarding Richard Nixon during the 1960 United States presidential election. During the campaign, independent candidate Eamonn Gavin called on a national referendum to be held on the legalisation of flogging for criminals.

== Result ==
Director of elections for the Fianna Fáil campaign, Bertie Ahern, conceded the election after the first count, saying that a vote pact between them and Labour may have changed the result.

1994 Dublin South-Central by-election
Party	Candidate	FPv%	Count								
Party	Candidate	FPv%	1	2	3	4	5	6	7	8	9
Democratic Left	Eric Byrne	27.8	7,445	7,479	7,601	7,748	7,930	8,352	8,984	10,284	12,741
Fianna Fáil	Michael Mulcahy	21.1	5,642	5,697	5,770	5,893	6,043	6,335	6,664	7,370	8,629
Fine Gael	Brian Hayes	17.3	4,637	4,677	4,723	4,752	4,926	5,628	6,028	6,619	
Labour	Joe Connolly	9.9	2,643	2,664	2,743	2,824	2,904	3,062	3,417		
Progressive Democrats	Cáit Keane	7.0	1,881	1,912	1,939	1,955	2,095				
Green	John Goodwillie	6.5	1,752	1,809	1,904	2,138	2,332	2,579			
Independent	Eamonn Gavin	3.6	972	1,038	1,053	1,088					
Sinn Féin	Martina Gibney	2.9	781	800	859						
Workers' Party	Shay Kelly	2.2	595	618							
Independent	Michael Park	1.0	275								
Independent	Benny Cooney	0.6	152								
Electorate: 62,300 Valid: 26,775 Quota: 13,388 Turnout: 43.0%

== Later careers ==
Among the candidates were Senator and future TD Michael Mulcahy, Brian Hayes who would go on to serve as both a Minister of State and MEP, Dublin City Councillor Joe Connolly and South Dublin County Councillor and future Senator Cáit Keane.
