= Brian Hayes (politician) =

Irish former politician (born 1969)

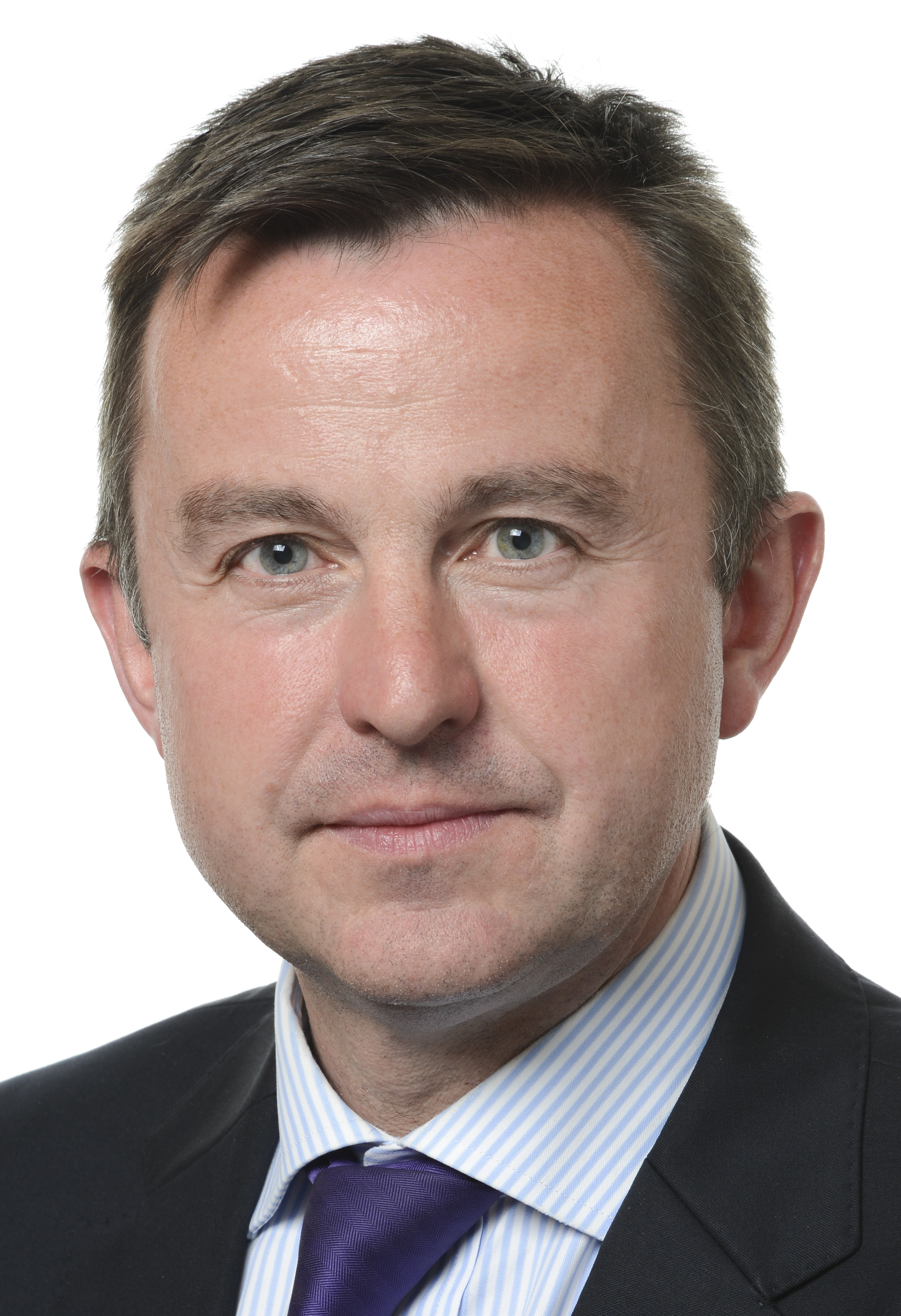
- Hayes in 2014

Minister of State
- 2011–2014: Finance
- 2011–2014: Public Expenditure and Reform

Leader of the Opposition in the Seanad
- In office 21 July 2002 – 30 May 2007
- Leader: Enda Kenny
- Preceded by: Maurice Manning
- Succeeded by: Frances Fitzgerald

Leader of Fine Gael in the Seanad
- In office 21 July 2002 – 30 May 2007
- Leader: Enda Kenny
- Preceded by: Maurice Manning
- Succeeded by: Frances Fitzgerald

Member of the European Parliament
- In office 1 July 2014 – 1 July 2019
- Constituency: Dublin

Teachta Dála
- In office May 2007 – May 2014
- In office June 1997 – May 2002
- Constituency: Dublin South-West

Senator
- In office 12 September 2002 – 24 May 2007
- Constituency: Cultural and Educational Panel
- In office 20 December 1995 – 6 June 1997
- Constituency: Nominated by the Taoiseach

Personal details
- Born: 23 August 1969 (age 57) Tallaght, Dublin, Ireland
- Party: Fine Gael
- Other political affiliations: Democratic Left
- Spouse: Genievive Hayes (m. 2003)
- Children: 3
- Education: St Patrick's College, Maynooth; Trinity College Dublin

Brian Hayes (born 23 August 1969) is an Irish former Fine Gael politician who served as a Minister of State from 2011 to 2014, Leader of the Opposition in the Seanad and Leader of Fine Gael in the Seanad from 2002 to 2007. He served as a Member of the European Parliament (MEP) for the Dublin constituency from 2014 to 2019. He was as a Teachta Dála (TD) for the Dublin South-West constituency from 1997 to 2002 and 2007 to 2014. He was also a Senator from 1995 to 1997, after being nominated by the Taoiseach and from 2002 to 2007 for the Cultural and Educational Panel.

== Early life ==
Hayes was born in Dublin. He was educated at Garbally College, Ballinasloe, County Galway; St Patrick's College, Maynooth, from which he received a degree in history and sociology in 1991, and Trinity College Dublin. Formerly a secondary school teacher, he was a member of South Dublin County Council between 1995 and 2003.

== Political career ==
Before joining Fine Gael Hayes had been a member of Democratic Left, a party which he joined because of the hardline anti-Provisional IRA and anti-Irish Republican policies of its leader Proinsias de Rossa. He subsequently joined Fine Gael for similar reasons, this time inspired by the anti-Sinn Féin stance of that party's then leader, John Bruton. He was the party's youth and education officer during the 1990s, and unsuccessfully contested the 1994 Dublin South-Central by-election for the party. In December 1995, he was nominated by the Taoiseach, John Bruton, to the 20th Seanad, where he was appointed government spokesperson on the Environment. Hayes was first elected to Dáil Éireann at the 1997 general election for the Dublin South-West constituency. He was appointed Fine Gael spokesperson on Housing, House Prices and Urban Renewal.

In a reshuffle of the Fine Gael front bench in June 2000, Hayes was promoted as spokesperson on Northern Ireland. Between 2001 and 2002 he served as Fine Gael's spokesperson on Social and Community Affairs. Hayes lost his seat at the 2002 general election but was elected to Seanad Éireann, where he served as Fine Gael Seanad leader and spokesperson on Defence and Northern Ireland.

At the 2007 general election he was re-elected to the Dáil on the first count in the Dublin South-West constituency. He was party spokesperson for Education and Science from 2007 to 2010.

On 19 August 2008, Hayes used a report in the Irish Independent to say that immigrant children should be "segregated" until their English language skills match those of native children. His comments generated considerable debate in the days that followed. The Irish National Teachers' Organisation (INTO) described the idea put forward by Hayes as "discriminatory, inequitable and deeply flawed". He later apologized and spoke of his regret but insisted this "should not take away from the substance of what I said".

In June 2010, he supported Richard Bruton's leadership challenge to Enda Kenny. Following Kenny's victory in a motion of confidence, Hayes was not re-appointed to the front bench. In October 2010, he was appointed as party Deputy spokesperson on Finance with special responsibility for Public Expenditure.

== Ministerial career (2011–2014) ==
On 10 March 2011, Hayes was appointed by the Fine Gael–Labour government on the nomination of Taoiseach Enda Kenny as Minister of State at the Department of Finance and at the Department of Public Expenditure and Reform with responsibility for Public Service Reform and the Office of Public Works.

After sudden floods killed two people in October 2011, he claimed the response of local authorities was "not adequate". In a newspaper article for the Sunday Independent in March 2012, one year after the Irish people voted to remove them from office, Hayes claimed Ireland still needed Fianna Fáil and questioned if their absence would be "in the interests of Irish democracy".

While in the position of Minister of State at the Department of Finance he sought to improve the domestic economy by focusing more intensively on domestic sectors likely to lead to job creation. This included initiatives such as the expansion of Aspen Pharma to Citywest, the opening of Charles River Managed Services in Citywest, and the launch of Paycheck Plus’ UK branch.

Hayes publicly acknowledged that Ireland had suffered reputational damage following the death of Savita Halappanavar, the pregnant Indian woman who died after being denied an abortion at University Hospital Galway.

== European Parliament ==
He was elected as the Fine Gael candidate for the Dublin constituency at the 2014 European Parliament election, terminating his appointment as Minister of State. Hayes was the lead negotiator for the European People's Party (EPP) on the plan for a Pan-European Pension Product (PEPP). On 6 November 2018, Hayes announced that he was leaving politics and would not contest the European Parliament election in 2019. He is currently Chief Executive of Banking & Payment Federation Ireland.

== Oireachtas Golf Society scandal ==
In August 2020, Hayes became one of the figures of the Oireachtas Golf Society scandal, a scandal created when members of the Oireachtas Golf Society were discovered to have breached the rules set down by the Irish government about gathering during the COVID-19 pandemic.

Political offices
| Preceded by Martin Mansergh | Minister of State at the Department of Finance; 2011–2014 | Succeeded by Simon Harris |

| Dáil | Election | Deputy (Party) | Deputy (Party) | Deputy (Party) | Deputy (Party) | Deputy (Party) |
|---|---|---|---|---|---|---|
| 13th | 1948 | Seán MacBride (CnaP) | Peadar Doyle (FG) | Bernard Butler (FF) | Michael O'Higgins (FG) | Robert Briscoe (FF) |
| 14th | 1951 | Seán MacBride (CnaP) | Peadar Doyle (FG) | Bernard Butler (FF) | Michael ffrench-O'Carroll (Ind.) | Robert Briscoe (FF) |
| 15th | 1954 | Seán MacBride (CnaP) | Peadar Doyle (FG) | Bernard Butler (FF) | Michael O'Higgins (FG) | Robert Briscoe (FF) |
| 15th | 1956 by-election | Seán MacBride (CnaP) | Noel Lemass (FF) | Bernard Butler (FF) | Michael O'Higgins (FG) | Robert Briscoe (FF) |
| 16th | 1957 | James Carroll (Ind.) | Noel Lemass (FF) | Bernard Butler (FF) | Michael O'Higgins (FG) | Robert Briscoe (FF) |
| 16th | 1959 by-election | James Carroll (Ind.) | Noel Lemass (FF) | Richie Ryan (FG) | Michael O'Higgins (FG) | Robert Briscoe (FF) |
| 17th | 1961 | James Carroll (Ind.) | Noel Lemass (FF) | Richie Ryan (FG) | James O'Keeffe (FG) | Robert Briscoe (FF) |
| 18th | 1965 | John O'Connell (Lab) | Noel Lemass (FF) | Richie Ryan (FG) | Joseph Dowling (FF) | Ben Briscoe (FF) |
| 19th | 1969 | John O'Connell (Lab) | Noel Lemass (FF) | Seán Dunne (Lab) | Joseph Dowling (FF) | 4 seats 1969–1977 |
| 19th | 1970 by-election | John O'Connell (Lab) | Noel Lemass (FF) | Seán Sherwin (FF) | Joseph Dowling (FF) | 4 seats 1969–1977 |
| 20th | 1973 | John O'Connell (Lab) | Noel Lemass (FF) | Declan Costello (FG) | Joseph Dowling (FF) | 4 seats 1969–1977 |
| 20th | 1976 by-election | John O'Connell (Lab) | Brendan Halligan (Lab) | Declan Costello (FG) | Joseph Dowling (FF) | 4 seats 1969–1977 |
| 21st | 1977 | Constituency abolished. See Dublin Ballyfermot | | | | |

| Dáil | Election | Deputy (Party) | Deputy (Party) | Deputy (Party) | Deputy (Party) | Deputy (Party) |
|---|---|---|---|---|---|---|
| 22nd | 1981 | Seán Walsh (FF) | Larry McMahon (FG) | Mary Harney (FF) | Mervyn Taylor (Lab) | 4 seats 1981–1992 |
| 23rd | 1982 (Feb) | Seán Walsh (FF) | Larry McMahon (FG) | Mary Harney (FF) | Mervyn Taylor (Lab) | 4 seats 1981–1992 |
| 24th | 1982 (Nov) | Seán Walsh (FF) | Michael O'Leary (FG) | Mary Harney (FF) | Mervyn Taylor (Lab) | 4 seats 1981–1992 |
| 25th | 1987 | Seán Walsh (FF) | Chris Flood (FF) | Mary Harney (PDs) | Mervyn Taylor (Lab) | 4 seats 1981–1992 |
| 26th | 1989 | Pat Rabbitte (WP) | Chris Flood (FF) | Mary Harney (PDs) | Mervyn Taylor (Lab) | 4 seats 1981–1992 |
| 27th | 1992 | Pat Rabbitte (DL) | Chris Flood (FF) | Mary Harney (PDs) | Mervyn Taylor (Lab) | Éamonn Walsh (Lab) |
| 28th | 1997 | Pat Rabbitte (DL) | Chris Flood (FF) | Mary Harney (PDs) | Conor Lenihan (FF) | Brian Hayes (FG) |
| 29th | 2002 | Pat Rabbitte (Lab) | Charlie O'Connor (FF) | Seán Crowe (SF) | Conor Lenihan (FF) | 4 seats 2002–2016 |
| 30th | 2007 | Pat Rabbitte (Lab) | Charlie O'Connor (FF) | Brian Hayes (FG) | Conor Lenihan (FF) | 4 seats 2002–2016 |
| 31st | 2011 | Pat Rabbitte (Lab) | Eamonn Maloney (Lab) | Brian Hayes (FG) | Seán Crowe (SF) | 4 seats 2002–2016 |
| 31st | 2014 by-election | Pat Rabbitte (Lab) | Eamonn Maloney (Lab) | Paul Murphy (AAA) | Seán Crowe (SF) | 4 seats 2002–2016 |
| 32nd | 2016 | Colm Brophy (FG) | John Lahart (FF) | Paul Murphy (AAA–PBP) | Seán Crowe (SF) | Katherine Zappone (Ind.) |
| 33rd | 2020 | Colm Brophy (FG) | John Lahart (FF) | Paul Murphy (S–PBP) | Seán Crowe (SF) | Francis Noel Duffy (GP) |
| 34th | 2024 | Colm Brophy (FG) | John Lahart (FF) | Paul Murphy (PBP–S) | Seán Crowe (SF) | Ciarán Ahern (Lab) |
