= 1994 Mayo West by-election =

By-election to the 27th Dáil

- 9 June 1994
- Turnout: 29,123 (63.4%)
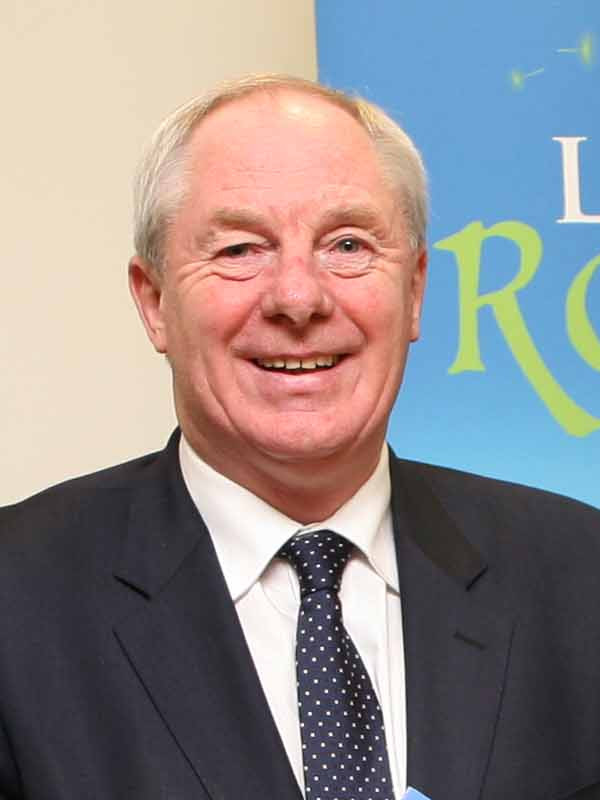
		Cooper Flynn	McGuinness
Nominee	Michael Ring	Beverley Cooper Flynn	Paddy McGuinness
Party	Fine Gael	Fianna Fáil	Independent
First preferences	10,390	10,967	6,275
Percentage	35.7%	37.7%	21.6%
Final count	14,063	13,639	–
TD before election
Pádraig Flynn
Fianna Fáil
TD after election
Michael Ring
Fine Gael

A Dáil by-election was held in the constituency of Mayo West in Ireland on Thursday, 9 June 1994, to fill a vacancy in the 27th Dáil. It followed the resignation of Fianna Fáil Teachta Dála (TD) Pádraig Flynn on 4 January 1993 prior to his appointment as a European Commissioner.

== Timing ==
On 22 December 1992, Taoiseach Albert Reynolds announced that the outgoing Fianna Fáil government had nominated Pádraig Flynn, the Minister for Justice and the Minister for Industry and Commerce, (Note: Flynn had served as Minister for Justice from 11 February 1992. He was later appointed to the additional post of Minister for Industry and Commerce on 4 November 1992 when the Progressive Democrats left government.) to be European Commissioner, to take up office on 5 January 1993. Flynn resigned as a TD on 4 January 1993, and his portfolios were reassigned to other members of the government on that date.

On 28 April 1993, a Democratic Left motion to issue the writ of election to fill the vacancy (and that in Dublin South-Central), opposed by the Fianna Fáil–Labour Party coalition government, was defeated by 46 to 80. On 24 February 1994, a Fine Gael motion to issue the writs was defeated by 43 to 65. On 18 May 1994, a government motion to issue the writs was agreed.

It was held on 9 June 1994, the same day as the 1994 European Parliament election, the 1994 local elections, and the 1994 Dublin South-Central by-election. Writing in 1996, Michael Gallagher gave the 521 days between Flynn's resignation in January 1993 and the date of the by-election as the longest interval between the creation of a vacancy and the holding of the resultant by-election. It would later be surpassed by the delay of 539 days in holding the 2010 Donegal South-West by-election.

== Result ==
1994 Mayo West by-election
Party	Candidate	FPv%	Count	
Party	Candidate	FPv%	1	2
Fianna Fáil	Beverley Cooper Flynn	37.7	10,967	13,639
Fine Gael	Michael Ring	35.7	10,390	14,063
Independent	Paddy McGuinness	21.6	6,275	
Labour	Johnny Mee	3.8	1,103	
Independent	Jerry Cowley	1.3	388	
Electorate: 45,932 Valid: 29,123 Quota: 14,562 Turnout: 63.4%

The by-election was won by the Fine Gael candidate, Michael Ring, who had served on Mayo County Council since 1991. Ring was introduced to the Dáil on 14 June by his constituency and party colleague, Enda Kenny. Ring was returned at each subsequent general election until his retirement at the 2024 general election and served as Minister for Rural and Community Development from 2017 to 2020.

Among the other candidates were Pádraig Flynn's daughter, Beverley Cooper Flynn, and Jerry Cowley, both of whom later served as TDs.
