= Beverley Flynn =

Irish former politician (born 1966)

Teachta Dála
- In office June 1997 – February 2011
- Constituency: Mayo

Personal details
- Born: 9 June 1966 (age 60) Castlebar, County Mayo, Ireland
- Party: Fianna Fáil
- Spouse: John Cooper (m. 1996; div. 2009)
- Children: 1
- Parent: Pádraig Flynn (father)
- Education: University College Dublin

Beverley Flynn (born 9 June 1966) is an Irish former Fianna Fáil politician who was a Teachta Dála (TD) for the Mayo constituency from 1997 to 2011.

== Early life and political career ==
She is the daughter of the former Fianna Fáil minister and European commissioner, Pádraig Flynn, who once described her as a "class act". She first stood for election in the June 1994 Mayo West by-election as the Fianna Fáil candidate, but was not successful. The by-election was caused by the appointment of her father as Ireland's European commissioner and was won by Michael Ring of Fine Gael. She was first elected to Dáil Éireann at the 1997 general election, as a Fianna Fáil TD for the Mayo constituency. In 2003, given that her marriage to John Cooper had ended some time previously, she requested that the media refer to her as Beverley Flynn rather than Beverley Cooper-Flynn.

== Libel action ==
The RTÉ journalist Charlie Bird claimed in a report that, while an employee of National Irish Bank, Flynn had assisted clients of the bank in evading tax by funnelling undeclared income to Clerical Medical schemes based in the Isle of Man. She denied the claims and sued RTÉ, Bird and retired farmer James Howard for libel in the High Court in 2001. The jury found that although RTÉ had not proved its case (it was a different employee who had handled Howard's account), the allegations were found to be substantially true (that RTÉ had proved Flynn had encouraged others to avail of illegal investment schemes). Thus, despite Flynn technically winning the case, she was awarded no damages as her reputation was not materially damaged), along with costs being awarded against her. Flynn appealed against the decision to the Supreme Court, where she lost.

=== Delay in paying costs ===
Flynn at first offered to settle with RTÉ for €590,000. RTÉ rejected this and moved to have her declared bankrupt. When the bankruptcy action against her opened in the High Court in June 2007, her lawyers were granted a postponement to allow her to challenge the constitutionality of legislation which bars bankrupts from Dáil membership. Lawyers for RTÉ accused Flynn of embarking on a "litigious frolic in her own interest". She subsequently abandoned plans to challenge the legislation, which was eventually changed in 2014 with Mick Wallace, a bankrupt TD, sitting from 2016 to 2019.

On 24 June 2007, Flynn announced that she had reached a final settlement with RTÉ, paying €1.24 million of the outstanding €2.4 million The settlement created a major outcry from the public, the print media and by some TDs as RTÉ, Ireland's public service broadcaster, is part-funded by a television license fee. The then Taoiseach, Bertie Ahern, "rejected as "contemptuous" and "sinister" any implication that he was involved in the settlement [between Flynn and RTÉ]". Ahern issued the denial after allegations made by Fine Gael and the Labour Party that RTÉ bowed to pressure from him to reach a settlement with Flynn. RTÉ also denied this took place.

== Relationship with Fianna Fáil ==
Flynn has had a difficult relationship with Fianna Fáil. She was forced to resign from the party in February 1999 for refusing to support a Government motion against her father, but rejoined in November 1999. In April 2001, she was expelled again over her libel case, but was again allowed to rejoin before the 2002 general election. She was expelled again in May 2004, after the results of her libel appeal. A cumann (branch) of Fianna Fáil that had continued to support Flynn was disbanded by the party headquarters, a first for the party. She successfully contested the 2007 general election as an independent and was elected on the eighth count. She was readmitted to the Fianna Fáil once more, at a meeting of its national executive on 3 April 2008, in what has been described as "questionable circumstances".

== Independent TD allowance ==
After she rejoined Fianna Fáil, controversy arose about Flynn's entitlement to a tax-free allowance available to independent TDs. This allowance is to allow independent TDs to compete with those who are from a political party on level terms for the duration of their term as an elected representative. However, upon her return to Fianna Fáil there were questions about whether or not she continued to qualify.

She responded that, in addition to her €106,000 basic salary, she qualified for the €41,000 allowance as she won her seat as an independent TD. After meeting with the Taoiseach Brian Cowen on 6 January 2009, she stated that she would no longer claim the allowance. She also stated that the allowance was used to benefit her constituents.

She retired from politics at the 2011 general election. In the period from 2011 to 2014, she received pension and lump sums of around €194,921.

| Dáil | Election | Deputy (Party) | Deputy (Party) | Deputy (Party) | Deputy (Party) | Deputy (Party) |
|---|---|---|---|---|---|---|
| 28th | 1997 | Beverley Flynn (FF) | Tom Moffatt (FF) | Enda Kenny (FG) | Michael Ring (FG) | Jim Higgins (FG) |
| 29th | 2002 | Beverley Flynn (FF) | John Carty (FF) | Enda Kenny (FG) | Michael Ring (FG) | Jerry Cowley (Ind.) |
| 30th | 2007 | Beverley Flynn (Ind.) | Dara Calleary (FF) | Enda Kenny (FG) | Michael Ring (FG) | John O'Mahony (FG) |
| 31st | 2011 | Michelle Mulherin (FG) | Dara Calleary (FF) | Enda Kenny (FG) | Michael Ring (FG) | John O'Mahony (FG) |
| 32nd | 2016 | Lisa Chambers (FF) | Dara Calleary (FF) | Enda Kenny (FG) | Michael Ring (FG) | 4 seats 2016–2024 |
| 33rd | 2020 | Rose Conway-Walsh (SF) | Dara Calleary (FF) | Alan Dillon (FG) | Michael Ring (FG) | 4 seats 2016–2024 |
| 34th | 2024 | Rose Conway-Walsh (SF) | Dara Calleary (FF) | Alan Dillon (FG) | Keira Keogh (FG) | Paul Lawless (Aon) |
