= 1997 Irish general election =

Election to the 28th Dáil

- 6 June 1997

166 seats in Dáil Éireann 84 seats needed for a majority
- Turnout: 65.9% ▼2.6 pp
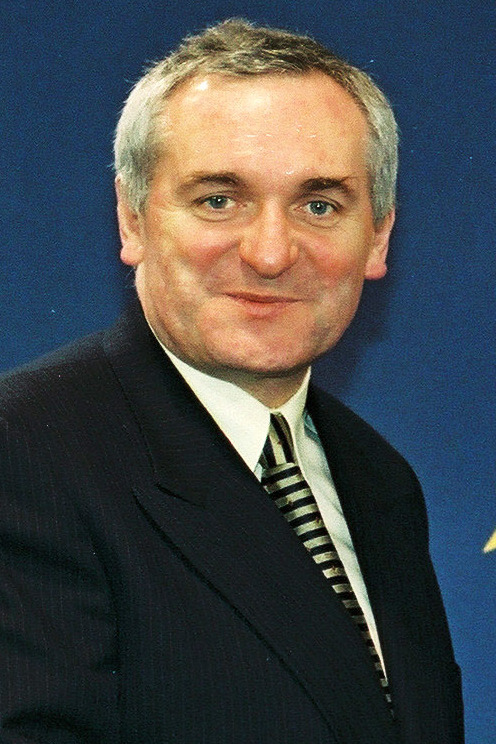

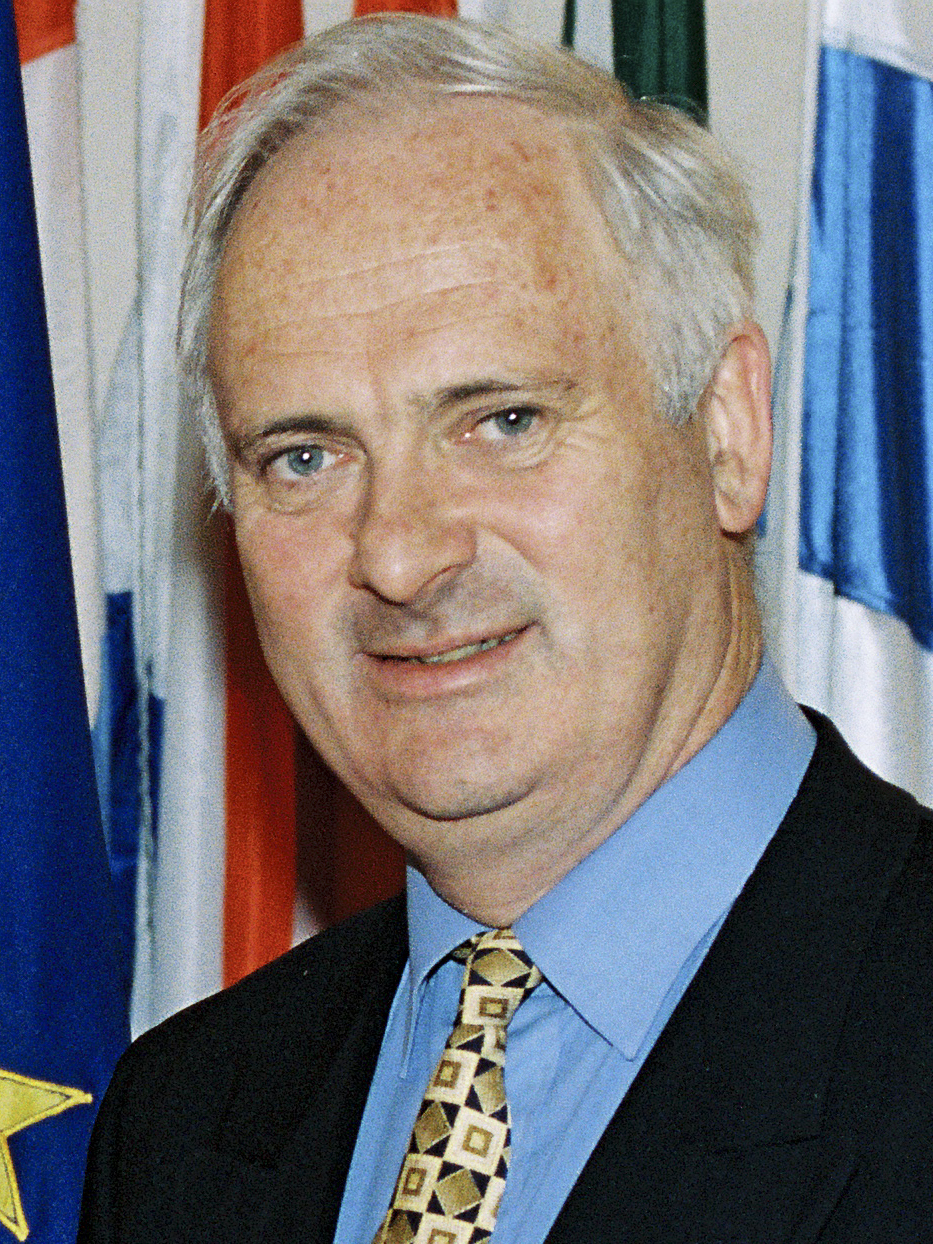

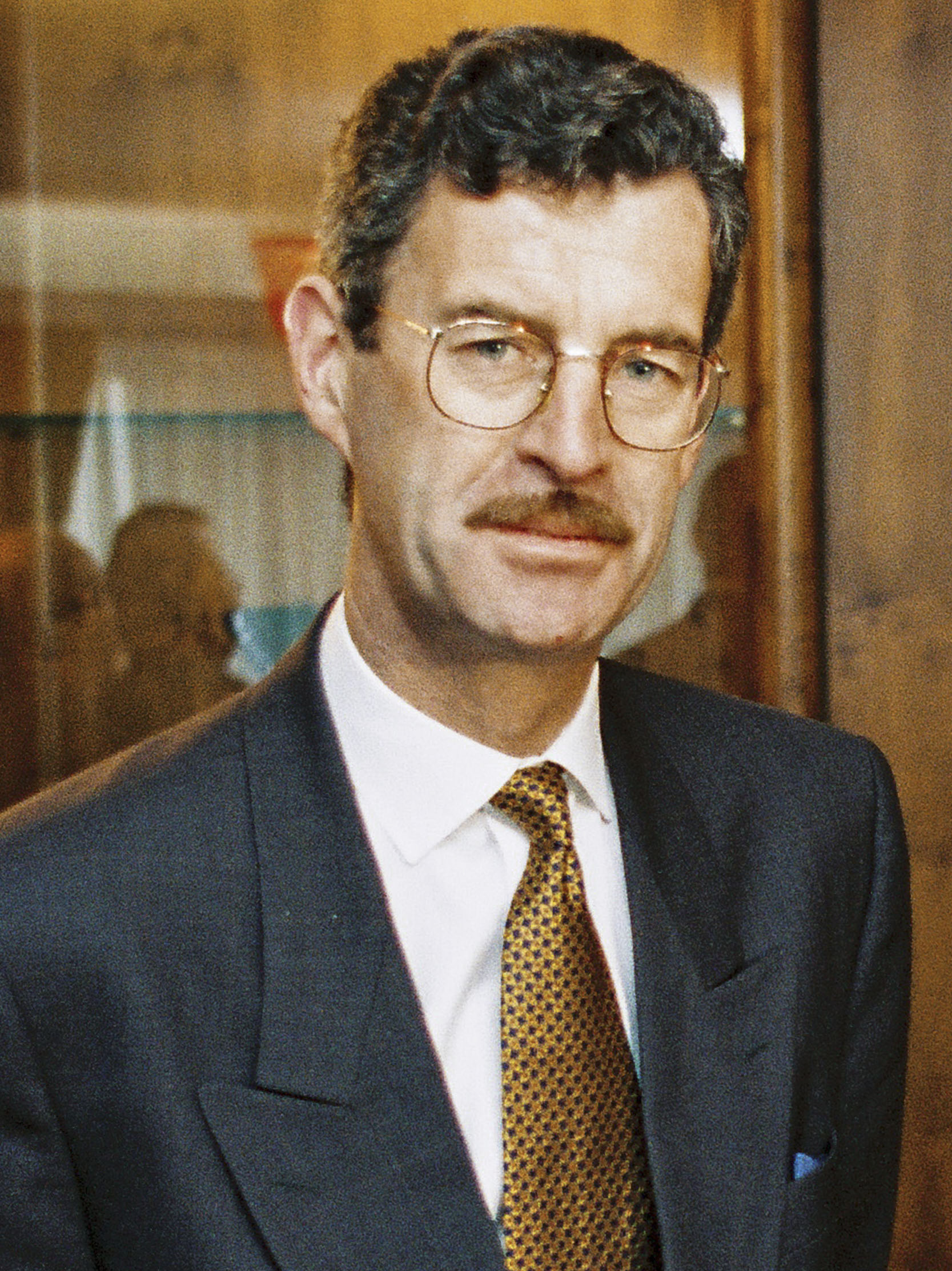

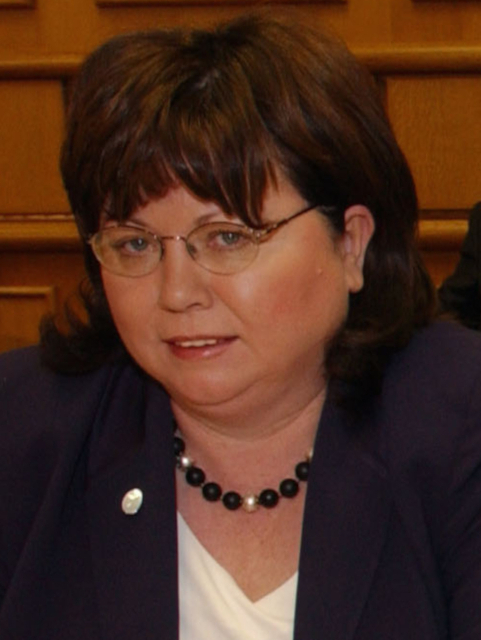

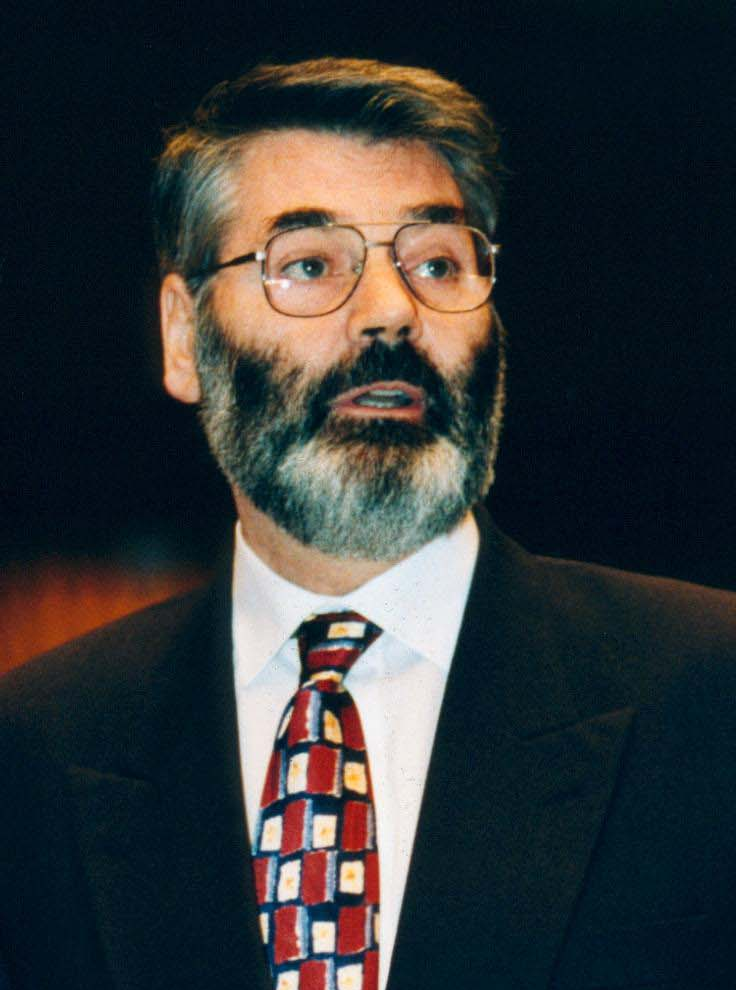

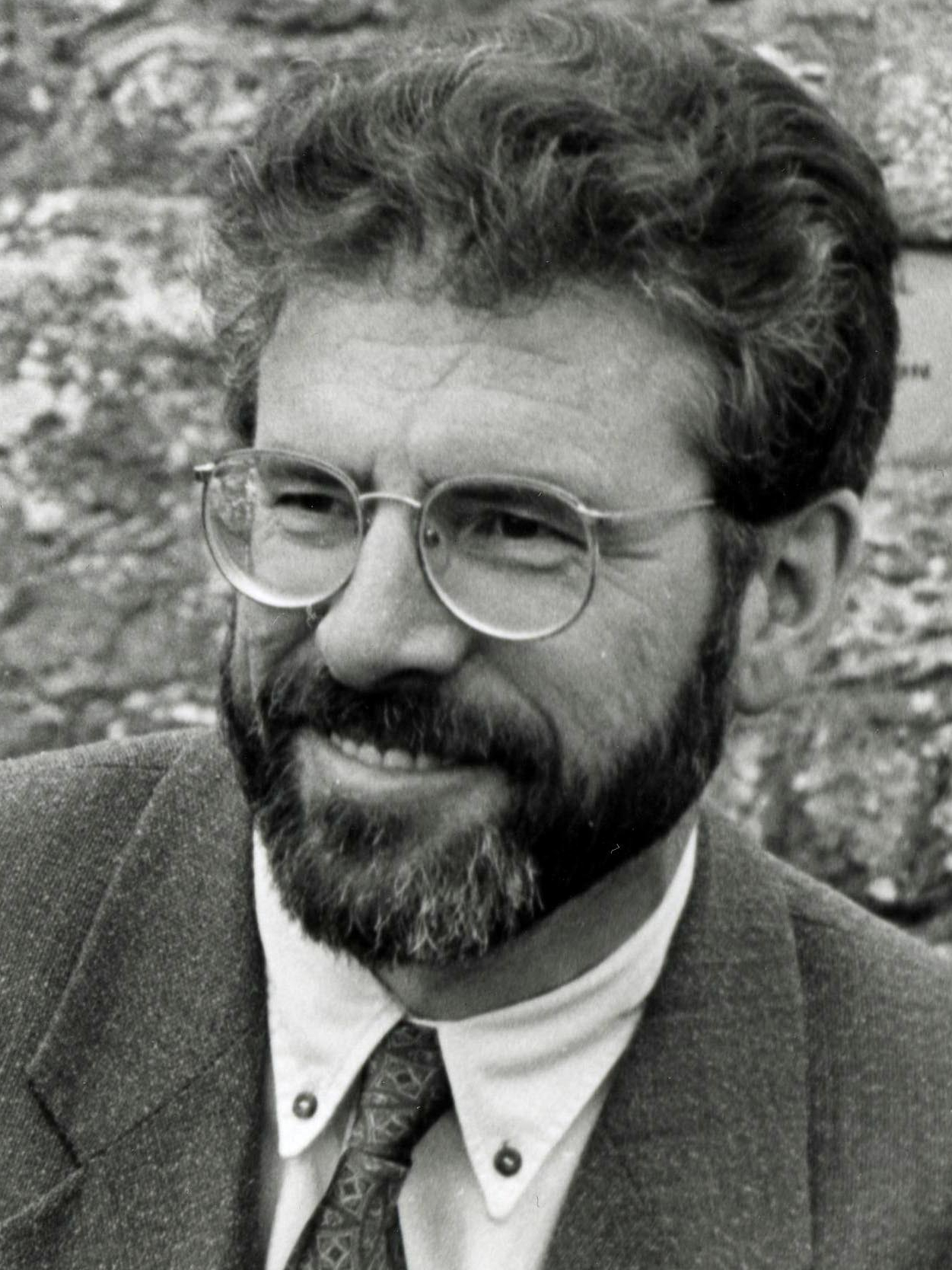

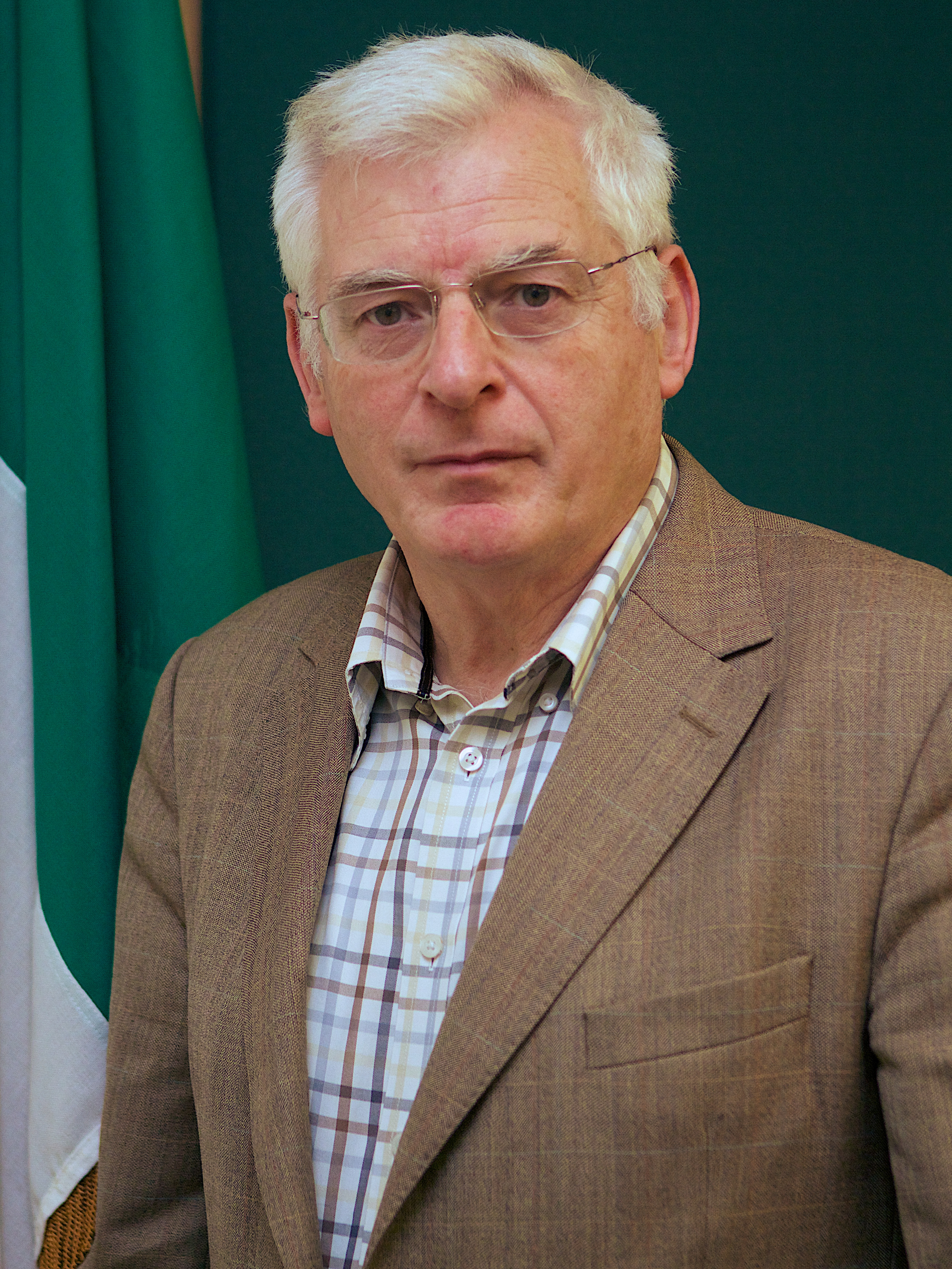
	First party	Second party	Third party
Leader	Bertie Ahern	John Bruton	Dick Spring
Party	Fianna Fáil	Fine Gael	Labour
Leader since	19 December 1994	20 November 1990	November 1982
Leader's seat	Dublin Central	Meath	Kerry North
Last election	68 seats, 39.1%	45 seats, 24.5%	33 seats, 19.3%
Seats won	77	54	17
Seat change	▲9	▲9	▼16
Popular vote	703,700	499,900	186,000
Percentage	39.3%	27.9%	10.4%
Swing	▲0.2 pp	▲3.4 pp	▼8.9 pp
	Fourth party	Fifth party	Sixth party
			GP
Leader	Mary Harney	Proinsias De Rossa	None
Party	Progressive Democrats	Democratic Left	Green
Leader since	12 October 1993	1992	N/A
Leader's seat	Dublin South-West	Dublin North-West	N/A
Last election	10 seats, 4.7%	4 seats, 2.8%	1 seat, 1.4%
Seats won	4	4	2
Seat change	▼6	0	▲1
Popular vote	83,800	44,900	49,300
Percentage	4.7%	2.5%	2.8%
Swing	0.0 pp	▼0.3 pp	▲1.4 pp
	Seventh party	Eighth party
Leader	Gerry Adams	Joe Higgins
Party	Sinn Féin	Socialist Party
Leader since	13 November 1983
Leader's seat	Did not stand (Note: Gerry Adams, the leader of Sinn Féin, was an MP for Belfast West. After the election, Caoimhghín Ó Caoláin became sole member of the Sinn Féin parliamentary party.)	Dublin West
Last election	0	Did not exist
Seats won	1	1
Seat change	▲1	▲1
Popular vote	45,614	12,445
Percentage	2.5%	0.7%
Swing	▲0.9 pp	New
Taoiseach before election
John Bruton
Fine Gael
Taoiseach after election
Bertie Ahern
Fianna Fáil

The 1997 Irish general election to the 28th Dáil was held on Friday, 6 June, following the dissolution of the 27th Dáil on 15 May by President Mary Robinson, on the request of Taoiseach John Bruton. The general election took place in 41 Dáil constituencies throughout Ireland for 166 seats in Dáil Éireann, the house of representatives of the Oireachtas, under a revision in the Electoral (Amendment) Act 1995.

The two largest parties, Fine Gael and Fianna Fáil, increased both their vote totals and representation, while both the junior parties in the Dáil, the Labour Party and the Progressive Democrats, had disastrous campaigns that saw their representation in the Dáil slashed by 50% or greater. However, some of the other minor parties in the Dáil saw improvements: for the first time in 75 years a Sinn Féin TD took their seat in the Dáil after Caoimhghín Ó Caoláin was elected, while the Green Party added a second TD and the Socialist Party gained their first ever national representative in Joe Higgins.

Following the election, the 28th Dáil met at Leinster House on 26 June to nominate the Taoiseach for appointment by the president and to approve the appointment of a new government of Ireland. Bertie Ahern was appointed Taoiseach, forming the 25th government of Ireland, a minority coalition government of Fianna Fáil and the Progressive Democrats.

The election has been described by Irish Independent journalist Shane Coleman as a prelude to the "golden years" of the Celtic Tiger, and thus one of the most significant general elections in Irish history.

== Background ==
The maximum amount of time between a general election in Ireland is five years, and thus the governing Rainbow Coalition of Fine Gael, the Labour Party and Democratic Left knew an election would have to be called in mid to late 1997. Fine Gael had wanted to wait until the autumn to call the election, but Labour were keen to fight their campaign in the summer. Anticipating the election, on 14 April 1997 during their annual party conference, Labour leader Dick Spring declared "I will not, in the aftermath of the next general election, come before you and recommend any form of coalition with either of the parties that make up the centre-right alternative, the Progressive Democrats or Fianna Fail", which ruled out the possibility of Labour being able to play kingmaker between possible coalition blocs.

Both Fianna Fáil and the Progressive Democrats were delighted by the decision to hold the election in the summer instead of the autumn; Fianna Fáil in particular feared the release in October or November of the report by the McCracken Tribunal, which was investing allegations that Ben Dunne Jnr. had bribed members of Fianna Fáil and that they had aided him in tax evasion.

The 1997 general election saw the public offered a choice of two possible coalitions. The existing government was a coalition of Fine Gael, the Labour Party and Democratic Left – called the Rainbow Coalition, while the opposition "alternative coalition" consisted of Fianna Fáil and the Progressive Democrats.

== Campaigns ==
=== Rainbow coalition (Fine Gael, Labour, Democratic Left) ===
The outgoing Rainbow parties campaigned to re-elect the coalition and thus emphasized the working relationship that they had developed, running with the slogan 'Partnership That Works'. They claimed credit for a booming economy, improving social services and reforms such as the introduction of divorce. Despite this united front, each party fought its own campaign. Labour emphasised the number of campaign pledges it had managed to implement not only as part of the Rainbow government but also during its coalition with Fianna Fáil.

=== Fianna Fáil campaign ===
Fianna Fáil under Bertie Ahern had been restructuring itself after its turbulent period under Charles Haughey and Albert Reynolds. The party's central office gained control of candidate selection and modernised its campaigning strategy, especially concerning vote management and controlling transfers under Ireland's PR electoral system. In addition, the bitter internal feuding that had dogged the party for decades was ended by Ahern's more unifying style of leadership. This leadership also allowed Fianna Fáil to run a very energetic campaign that emphasised Ahern's relative youth and enthusiasm, which distanced the party from scandals that had beset the party.

=== Progressive Democrats' campaign ===
Despite entering the election with polls suggesting they would overtake Labour as the third biggest party, and with Mary Harney as the most popular party leader, the Progressive Democrats struggled. Initially, the party ran a presidential-style campaign that emphasised Harney. However, entering a pact with a resurgent Fianna Fáil meant it struggled to assert itself. In response, the PDs hastily published a manifesto — a move that backfired as it controversially called for single parent benefits to be cut in order to encourage single mothers to live with their parents. This drew fire from Proinsias De Rossa, who claimed Harney did "not have a bull's notion about social welfare". The Progressive Democrats' manifesto also called for the laying off of 25,000 public sector workers over five years, a proposal that was heavily criticised by the left-wing parties. In response, Fianna Fáil's leadership demanded a sit-down meeting with the Progressive Democrat leadership, and after the two parties publicly announced together that no layoffs would be made in the public sector without the consent of Irish trade unions. Harney also claimed her comments about unwed mothers had been misrepresented by the media.

=== Party slogans/Manifestos ===
Party	Slogan/Manifesto name	Refs
Fine Gael		
Fianna Fáil	People before Politics	
Labour Party	Labour makes the vital difference	
Progressive Democrats	Real answers, not idle promises	
Democratic Left	Make the future work	
Green Party	For Quality of Life	
Sinn Féin	Building a dynamic for change; A New Opportunity for Peace	
Socialist Party		

== Campaign topics ==
=== Sinn Féin and Northern Ireland ===
1997 was a pivotal year politically across the island of Ireland as the Troubles drew to an end and progress towards the forthcoming Good Friday Agreement was being made. Inevitably, the issue of Sinn Féin's participation in the election and each party's policy on Northern Ireland came up repeatedly during the campaign. Previous to the May 1997 United Kingdom general election, leader of Fine Gael John Bruton declared that if the IRA had not declared a ceasefire, then a vote for Sinn Féin would be a vote for violence. However, on 26 May, Labour leader and coalition partner Dick Spring stated that a vote for Sinn Féin in Northern Ireland would be a vote for peace. The opposition in the Dáil responded by declaring that the government was sending out mixed messaging about Sinn Féin and Northern Ireland.

In late May/early June, Bernie Ahern began attacking Bruton on the topic of Northern Ireland, criticising Bruton for not being the leading voice of "Nationalist Ireland" and promising that he would take this mantle if elected Taoiseach. Simultaneously, Sinn Féin leader Gerry Adams involved himself in the election by criticising Bruton's handling of the peace process. On 31 May, an active Provisional IRA landmine was discovered in Belfast, prompting Bruton to state he would "think very hard" before allowing any further contact between members of the government and Sinn Féin. Afterwards, the leader of the Democratic Left, Proinsias De Rossa, asked Ahern to clarify his "electoral support for Sinn Féin". Ahern denied he had ever lent support to Sinn Féin and went further by stating categorially he would rule Sinn Féin out of any possible coalition talks following the election. Ahern justified this by saying it would send the wrong message to Unionists in Northern Ireland to add Sinn Féin to a coalition.

=== Crime ===
The murder of journalist Veronica Guerin in June 1996 by drug lords in Dublin ensured that the subject of crime was a pressing one during the election. Although Fine Gael had traditionally been the "party of law and order" in Ireland, Fianna Fáil were able to seize on the subject of crime and declared they would have a "zero tolerance" approach to crime. Fianna Fáil Spokesperson on Crime, John O'Donoghue, was able to dictate the conversation and was also able, previous to the election, to convince the government to support his bill which gave greater powers to the Criminal Assets Bureau.

== Opinion polls ==
Polling firm	Date	FF	FG	Lab	PDs	DL	GP	Ind/Oth		
Polling firm	Date	Irish Times/MRBI	7 June	44	27	8	4	3	3	11
Independent Newspapers-IMS	2 June	44	29	9	5	2	3	6		
Irish Times/MRBI	28 May	42	26	11	7	2	4	8		
Independent Newspapers-IMS	29 May	40	29	11	6	2	4	8		
Independent Newspapers-IMS	26 May	41	26	10	5	2	4	12		
Irish Times/MRBI	20 May	43	26	10	7	2	3	9		
Irish Times/MRBI	5 May	43	26	12	8	2	3	6		

== Results ==
Party	Fianna Fáil	Fine Gael	Labour Party	Progressive Democrats	Green Party	Sinn Féin	Democratic Left	Socialist Party
Leader	Bertie Ahern	John Bruton	Dick Spring	Mary Harney	—	Gerry Adams	Proinsias De Rossa	Joe Higgins
Votes	39.3%, 703,682	27.9%, 499,936	10.4%, 186,044	4.7%, 83,765	2.8%, 49,323	2.5%, 45,614	2.5%, 44,901	0.7%, 12,445
Seats	77 (46.4%)	54 (32.5%)	17 (10.2%)	4 (2.4%)	2 (1.2%)	1 (0.6%)	4 (2.4%)	1 (0.6%)

↓
77	4	6	54	17	4
Fianna Fáil	PD	Inds	Fine Gael	Labour	DL

Vote Share of different parties in the election.
1. Fianna Fáil (39.3%)
2. Fine Gael (27.9%)
3. Labour Party (10.4%)
4. Progressive Democrats (4.70%)
5. Green Party (2.80%)
6. Sinn Féin (2.50%)
7. Democratic Left (2.50%)
8. National Party (1.10%)
9. Socialist Party (0.60%)
10. Other (8.20%)

Election to the 28th Dáil – 6 June 1997
Party	Leader	Seats	±	% of seats	First pref. votes	% FPv	±%
Fianna Fáil	Bertie Ahern	77	▲10	46.4	703,682	39.3	▲0.2
Fine Gael	John Bruton	54	▲9	32.5	499,936	27.9	▲3.4
Labour	Dick Spring	17	▼16	10.2	186,044	10.4	▼8.9
Progressive Democrats	Mary Harney	4	▼6	2.4	83,765	4.7	±0.0
Green	—	2	▲1	1.2	49,323	2.8	▲1.4
Sinn Féin	Gerry Adams	1	▲1	0.6	45,614	2.5	▲0.9
Democratic Left	Proinsias De Rossa	4	0	2.4	44,901	2.5	▼0.3
National Party	Nora Bennis	0	New	0	19,077	1.1	New
Socialist Party	Joe Higgins	1	New	0.6	12,445	0.7	New
Christian Solidarity	Gerard Casey	0	New	0	8,357	0.5	New
Workers' Party	Tom French	0	0	0	7,808	0.4	▼0.3
Socialist Workers	N/A	0	New	0	2,028	0.1	New
Natural Law Party	N/A	0	New	0	1,515	0.1	New
SKIA		0	New	0	1,388	0.1	New
Independent	N/A	6	▲2	3.6	123,102	7.9	▲1.1
Spoilt votes					17,947	—N/a	—N/a
Total		166	0	100	1,806,932	100	—N/a
Electorate/Turnout					2,741,262	65.9%	—N/a

The outgoing Ceann Comhairle retired at this election. Independents include Independent Fianna Fáil (11,607 votes, 1 seat).

=== Voting summary ===
First preference vote
Fianna Fáil	39.33%
Fine Gael	27.95%
Labour	10.40%
Progressive Democrats	4.68%
Green	2.76%
Sinn Féin	2.55%
Democratic Left	2.51%
National	1.07%
Socialist	0.70%
Others	1.18%
Independent	6.88%

=== Seats summary ===
Dáil seats
Fianna Fáil	46.39%
Fine Gael	32.53%
Labour	10.24%
Progressive Democrats	2.41%
Democratic Left	2.41%
Green	1.20%
Sinn Féin	0.60%
Socialist	0.60%
Independent	3.61%

Fianna Fáil increased its representation, but the Progressive Democrats had a disastrous election, maintaining its share of the vote, but winning only four seats compared to ten at the previous election, losing seats thought safe such as Cork North-Central and Dún Laoghaire.

Although Fine Gael gained seats, it entered opposition due to seat losses of its government coalition colleagues. One of the main features of the election, was the collapse of the Labour Party vote. Not only did it lose seats it had picked up in the 1992 general election, when its vote was at an all-time high – such as in Clare and Laois–Offaly – but it also lost reasonably safe seats, such as in Dublin North, Dublin Central and Cork South-Central. Dick Spring would retire as leader of the Labour Party later that year, after further disappointment in the presidential election. Democratic Left also suffered, losing its two gains made in by-elections during the 27th Dáil.

The Green Party won a second seat, with John Gormley elected in Dublin South-East. He was elected by just over 30 votes after a recount lasting four days saw Progressive Democrat Michael McDowell defeated. The loss of McDowell was particularly stinging to the Progressive Democrats as McDowell was their "chief ideologue".

Sinn Féin won its first Dáil seat since 1957, with the party winning a seat in Cavan–Monaghan with the election of Caoimhghín Ó Caoláin. It also narrowly missed a seat in Kerry North. When Ó Caoláin took his seat in the Dáil, it was the first time since 1922 that a member of Sinn Féin had done so, having abandoned its policy of abstention with regard to the Dáil in 1986. Ó Caoláin's entry into the Dáil marked a major turning point in the history of Sinn Féin, which would continue thereafter to hold a presence in the Dáil.

The Socialist Party, a Trotskyist party which consisted of former members of the Labour Party expelled in 1989, won its first seat in Dublin West.

== Government formation ==
Following the election, none of the major parties had a clear majority. Negotiations resulted in a Fianna Fáil–Progressive Democrats coalition taking office. Four Independent Teachta Dála (TDs) also supported the government ensuring a working majority. Bertie Ahern became the Taoiseach while Mary Harney of the Progressive Democrats became Tánaiste.

== Dáil membership changes ==
The following changes took place as a result of the election:

- 17 outgoing TDs retired, including the Ceann Comhairle, Seán Treacy
- 149 TDs stood for re-election
  - 121 were re-elected
  - 28 failed to be re-elected
- 45 successor TDs were elected
  - 32 were elected for the first time
  - 13 had previously been TDs
- There were 6 successor female TDs, replacing 9 outgoing, decreasing the total number by 3 to 20
- There were changes in 34 of the 41 constituencies contested

Outgoing TDs are listed in the constituency they contested in the election. For some, such as Kildare North, this differs from the constituency they represented in the outgoing Dáil. Where more than one change took place in a constituency the concept of successor is an approximation for presentation only.

Constituency	Departing TD	Party	Change	Comment	Successor TD	Party
Carlow–Kilkenny	M. J. Nolan	Fianna Fáil	Lost seat		John McGuinness	Fianna Fáil
Cavan–Monaghan	Jimmy Leonard	Fianna Fáil	Retired		Caoimhghín Ó Caoláin	Sinn Féin
Clare	Moosajee Bhamjee	Labour Party	Retired	Daly – Former TD	Brendan Daly	Fianna Fáil
Cork East	John Mulvihill	Labour Party	Lost seat		David Stanton	Fine Gael
Cork North-Central	Kathleen Lynch	Democratic Left	Lost seat		Noel O'Flynn	Fianna Fáil
Cork North-Central	Máirín Quill	Progressive Democrats	Lost seat		Billy Kelleher	Fianna Fáil
Cork North-West	Frank Crowley	Fine Gael	Lost seat		Michael Moynihan	Fianna Fáil
Cork South-Central	Peter Barry	Fine Gael	Retired		Deirdre Clune	Fine Gael
Cork South-Central	Toddy O'Sullivan	Labour Party	Lost seat	Dennehy – Former TD	John Dennehy	Fianna Fáil
Cork South-West	No membership changes					
Donegal North-East	Paddy Harte	Fine Gael	Lost seat		Harry Blaney	Ind. Fianna Fáil
Donegal South-West	Pat "the Cope" Gallagher	Fianna Fáil	Retired		Tom Gildea	Independent
Dublin Central	Joe Costello	Labour Party	Lost seat		Marian McGennis	Fianna Fáil
Dublin North	Seán Ryan	Labour Party	Lost seat	Wright – Former TD	G. V. Wright	Fianna Fáil
Dublin North-Central	No membership changes					
Dublin North-East	Seán Kenny	Labour Party	Lost seat	Cosgrave – Former TD	Michael Joe Cosgrave	Fine Gael
Dublin North-East	Liam Fitzgerald	Fianna Fáil	Lost seat		Martin Brady	Fianna Fáil
Dublin North-West	Mary Flaherty	Fine Gael	Lost seat		Pat Carey	Fianna Fáil
Dublin South	Eithne FitzGerald	Labour Party	Lost seat		Olivia Mitchell	Fine Gael
Dublin South-Central	Eric Byrne	Democratic Left	Lost seat		Seán Ardagh	Fianna Fáil
Dublin South-East	Michael McDowell	Progressive Democrats	Lost seat		John Gormley	Green Party
Dublin South-West	Éamonn Walsh	Labour Party	Lost seat		Conor Lenihan	Fianna Fáil
Dublin South-West	Mervyn Taylor	Labour Party	Retired		Brian Hayes	Fine Gael
Dublin West	Joan Burton	Labour Party	Lost seat		Joe Higgins	Socialist Party
Dún Laoghaire	Niamh Bhreathnach	Labour Party	Lost seat		Mary Hanafin	Fianna Fáil
Dún Laoghaire	Helen Keogh	Progressive Democrats	Lost seat	Barnes – Former TD	Monica Barnes	Fine Gael
Galway East			New seat		Ulick Burke	Fine Gael
Galway West	Máire Geoghegan-Quinn	Fianna Fáil	Retired	Fahey – Former TD	Frank Fahey	Fianna Fáil
Kerry North	No membership changes					
Kerry South	John O'Leary	Fianna Fáil	Retired		Jackie Healy-Rae	Independent
Kildare North	No membership changes					
Kildare South	New constituency, new seat				Jack Wall	Labour Party
Laois–Offaly	Liam Hyland	Fianna Fáil	Retired		Seán Fleming	Fianna Fáil
Laois–Offaly	Pat Gallagher	Labour Party	Lost seat	Enright – Former TD	Tom Enright	Fine Gael
Laois–Offaly	Ger Connolly	Fianna Fáil	Retired		John Moloney	Fianna Fáil
Limerick East	Peadar Clohessy	Progressive Democrats	Retired		Eddie Wade	Fianna Fáil
Limerick West	Gerry Collins	Fianna Fáil	Retired		Michael Collins	Fianna Fáil
Limerick West	Michael J. Noonan	Fianna Fáil	Retired		Dan Neville	Fine Gael
Longford–Roscommon	John Connor	Fine Gael	Lost seat		Denis Naughten	Fine Gael
Longford–Roscommon	Tom Foxe	Independent	Lost seat	Belton – Former TD	Louis Belton	Fine Gael
Louth	No membership changes					
Mayo	P. J. Morley	Fianna Fáil	Lost seat		Beverley Flynn	Fianna Fáil
Mayo	Séamus Hughes	Fianna Fáil	Lost seat	Constituency reduced to 5 seats		
Meath	Colm Hilliard	Fianna Fáil	Retired		Johnny Brady	Fianna Fáil
Meath	Brian Fitzgerald	Labour Party	Lost seat	Farrelly – Former TD	John V. Farrelly	Fine Gael
Sligo–Leitrim	Ted Nealon	Fine Gael	Retired		John Perry	Fine Gael
Sligo–Leitrim	Declan Bree	Labour Party	Lost seat	Reynolds – Former TD	Gerry Reynolds	Fine Gael
Tipperary North	John Ryan	Labour Party	Retired	O'Kennedy – Former TD	Michael O'Kennedy	Fianna Fáil
Tipperary South	Seán Treacy	Independent	Retired	Constituency seats from 4 to 3		
Waterford	No membership changes					
Westmeath	No membership changes					
Wexford	Avril Doyle	Fine Gael	Lost seat	D'Arcy – Former TD	Michael D'Arcy	Fine Gael
Wicklow	Godfrey Timmins	Fine Gael	Retired		Billy Timmins	Fine Gael
Wicklow	Liam Kavanagh	Labour Party	Lost seat	Roche – Former TD	Dick Roche	Fianna Fáil

== Seanad election ==
The Dáil election was followed by the election to the 21st Seanad.
