= Séamus Hughes =

Irish judge and politician (1952–2022)

Teachta Dála
- In office November 1992 – June 1997
- Constituency: Mayo West

Personal details
- Born: 1 September 1952; Westport, County Mayo, Ireland
- Died: 12 July 2022 (aged 69); County Mayo, Ireland
- Political party: Fianna Fáil
- Spouse: Maria Hughes
- Children: 4

Séamus F. Hughes (1 September 1952 – 12 July 2022) was an Irish District Court judge and Fianna Fáil politician.

He was from Westport, County Mayo. Hughes was a solicitor, when he was elected to the 27th Dáil as a Fianna Fáil Teachta Dála (TD) for the Mayo West constituency on his first attempt at the 1992 general election. He lost his seat at the 1997 general election when the constituency was combined with Mayo East and the combined Mayo constituency was reduced to 5 seats. Hughes was then appointed State Solicitor for County Mayo.

Hughes was a District Court judge from 2009 to 2022, sitting initially in District Court area Number One in County Donegal and thereafter District Court area Number Nine covering Athlone, Mullingar and Longford. He attracted criticism over comments on the ethnic backgrounds of those before him in court, having described some as "neanderthals" and commented on social welfare being like "snuff at a wake".

Dáil	Election	Deputy (Party)	Deputy (Party)	Deputy (Party)
19th	1969	Mícheál Ó Móráin (FF)	Joseph Lenehan (FF)	Henry Kenny (FG)
20th	1973	Denis Gallagher (FF)	Myles Staunton (FG)	Henry Kenny (FG)
20th	1975 by-election	Denis Gallagher (FF)	Myles Staunton (FG)	Enda Kenny (FG)
21st	1977	Denis Gallagher (FF)	Pádraig Flynn (FF)	Enda Kenny (FG)
22nd	1981	Denis Gallagher (FF)	Pádraig Flynn (FF)	Enda Kenny (FG)
23rd	1982 (Feb)	Denis Gallagher (FF)	Pádraig Flynn (FF)	Enda Kenny (FG)
24th	1982 (Nov)	Denis Gallagher (FF)	Pádraig Flynn (FF)	Enda Kenny (FG)
25th	1987	Denis Gallagher (FF)	Pádraig Flynn (FF)	Enda Kenny (FG)
26th	1989	Martin O'Toole (FF)	Pádraig Flynn (FF)	Enda Kenny (FG)
27th	1992	Séamus Hughes (FF)	Pádraig Flynn (FF)	Enda Kenny (FG)
27th	1994 by-election	Séamus Hughes (FF)	Michael Ring (FG)	Enda Kenny (FG)
28th	1997	Constituency abolished. See Mayo		
