= Eric Byrne =

Irish former politician (born 1947)

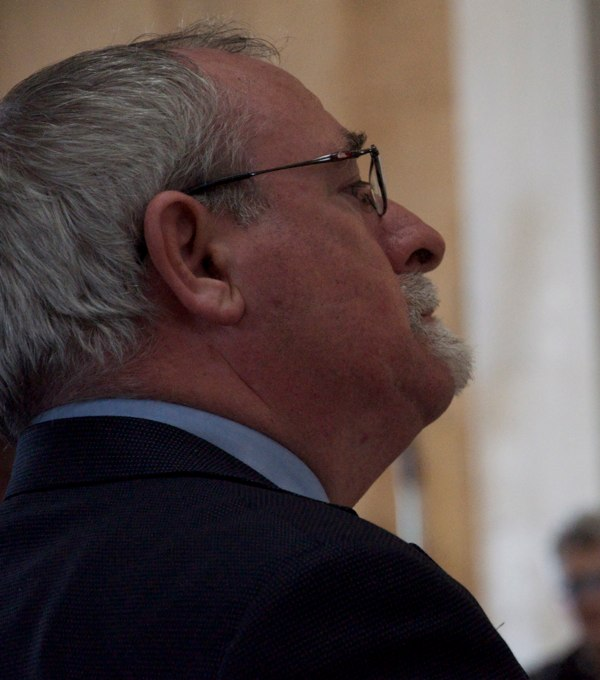

Teachta Dála
- In office February 2011 – February 2016
- In office June 1994 – June 1997
- In office June 1989 – November 1992
- Constituency: Dublin South-Central

Personal details
- Born: 21 April 1947 (age 79) Dublin, Ireland
- Party: Labour Party
- Other political affiliations: Official Sinn Féin; Workers' Party; Democratic Left
- Spouse: Ellen Hazelkorn
- Education: Bolton Street College of Technology

Eric Joseph Byrne (born 21 April 1947) is an Irish former Labour Party politician who served as a Teachta Dála (TD) for the Dublin South-Central constituency from 1989 to 1992, 1994 to 1997 and 2011 to 2016.

He was formerly a member of Official Sinn Féin, the Workers' Party and Democratic Left.

== Biography ==
Born in Dublin, he was educated at Synge Street CBS and the Bolton Street College of Technology. A carpenter before entering politics, Byrne stood unsuccessfully for election to Dáil Éireann as a Workers' Party candidate for Dublin Rathmines West at the 1977 general election and Dublin South-Central at the 1981, February 1982, November 1982 and 1987 general elections.

He was elected in 1985 as a Workers' Party member of Dublin City Council for Crumlin–Kimmage area, and was re-elected at subsequent local elections until 2011, where he was forced to resign his seat due to dual mandate. He was finally elected at the 1989 general election. He joined with Workers' Party members who formed Democratic Left in 1992. He unexpectedly lost his seat at the 1992 general election. Labour's Pat Upton was unexpectedly returned on the first count, with Byrne finally losing the last seat to Fianna Fáil's Ben Briscoe by five votes after a marathon 10-day count.

He was elected to the 27th Dáil at a by-election on 9 June 1994 following the resignation of long-serving Fianna Fáil TD John O'Connell (who had previously been a Labour TD for the same constituency). Byrne was a backbench supporter of the Rainbow government led by Fine Gael's John Bruton.

Byrne lost his seat again at the 1997 general election. Although the Labour Party and the Democratic Left merged in 1999, he was not selected to contest the Dublin South-Central by-election which followed Pat Upton's death later that year. Upton's sister Mary was elected for the Labour Party.

Byrne contested the 2002 general election on the Labour Party ticket as Mary Upton's running-mate, but was unsuccessful. Along with Mary Upton, he contested the Dublin South-Central constituency at the 2007 general election advocating a Labour Party/Fine Gael government but missed the final seat by 69 votes. Byrne was nominated by the Labour Party to contest the Seanad election in the Labour panel but was not elected. In 2009, he was re-elected to Dublin City Council. At the 2011 general election he was re-elected to the Dáil, after 14 years.

In January 2015, he became involved in an altercation with Sinn Féin TD, Jonathan O'Brien. During ministers questions, O'Brien had criticised Tánaiste Joan Burton over homelessness in Ireland, citing the experiences of his brother who was a recovering heroin addict. Byrne asked of O'Brien "Why doesn't his good family give him a home?" which infuriated O'Brien. The Irish Times journalist Miriam Lord criticized Byrne, remarking that "You sense the relief rising in the chamber. They don't like it when the real world intrudes. These sort of things don't really happen to TDs."

He lost his seat at the 2016 general election.

Dáil	Election	Deputy (Party)	Deputy (Party)	Deputy (Party)	Deputy (Party)	Deputy (Party)
13th	1948	Seán Lemass (FF)	James Larkin Jnr (Lab)	Con Lehane (CnaP)	Maurice E. Dockrell (FG)	John McCann (FF)
14th	1951	Seán Lemass (FF)	James Larkin Jnr (Lab)	Philip Brady (FF)	Maurice E. Dockrell (FG)	John McCann (FF)
15th	1954	Seán Lemass (FF)	James Larkin Jnr (Lab)	Thomas Finlay (FG)	Maurice E. Dockrell (FG)	Celia Lynch (FF)
16th	1957	Seán Lemass (FF)	Jack Murphy (Ind.)	Philip Brady (FF)	Maurice E. Dockrell (FG)	Celia Lynch (FF)
16th	1958 by-election	Seán Lemass (FF)	Patrick Cummins (FF)	Philip Brady (FF)	Maurice E. Dockrell (FG)	Celia Lynch (FF)
17th	1961	Seán Lemass (FF)	Patrick Cummins (FF)	Philip Brady (FF)	Maurice E. Dockrell (FG)	Joseph Barron (CnaP)
18th	1965	Seán Lemass (FF)	Frank Cluskey (Lab)	Philip Brady (FF)	Maurice E. Dockrell (FG)	Thomas J. Fitzpatrick (FF)
19th	1969	Richie Ryan (FG)	Ben Briscoe (FF)	Philip Brady (FF)	John O'Donovan (Lab)	4 seats 1969–1977
20th	1973	Richie Ryan (FG)	Ben Briscoe (FF)	Philip Brady (FF)	John Kelly (FG)	4 seats 1969–1977
21st	1977	Fergus O'Brien (FG)	Frank Cluskey (Lab)	Thomas J. Fitzpatrick (FF)	3 seats 1977–1981	
22nd	1981	Fergus O'Brien (FG)	Ben Briscoe (FF)	Thomas J. Fitzpatrick (FF)	Gay Mitchell (FG)	John O'Connell (Note: O'Connell served as Ceann Comhairle in the 22nd and 23rd Dáil from 1981 to 1983 and was returned automatically at the February 1982 and November 1982 general elections. He joined Fianna Fáil in January 1985.) (Ind.)
23rd	1982 (Feb)	Frank Cluskey (Lab)	Ben Briscoe (FF)	Thomas J. Fitzpatrick (FF)	Gay Mitchell (FG)	John O'Connell (Ind.)
24th	1982 (Nov)	Frank Cluskey (Lab)	Ben Briscoe (FF)	Fergus O'Brien (FG)	Gay Mitchell (FG)	John O'Connell (Ind.)
25th	1987	Frank Cluskey (Lab)	Ben Briscoe (FF)	Fergus O'Brien (FG)	Gay Mitchell (FG)	Mary Mooney (FF)
26th	1989	John O'Connell (FF)	Ben Briscoe (FF)	Fergus O'Brien (FG)	Gay Mitchell (FG)	Eric Byrne (WP)
27th	1992	John O'Connell (FF)	Ben Briscoe (FF)	Pat Upton (Lab)	Gay Mitchell (FG)	4 seats 1992–2002
27th	1994 by-election	Eric Byrne (DL)	Ben Briscoe (FF)	Pat Upton (Lab)	Gay Mitchell (FG)	4 seats 1992–2002
28th	1997	Seán Ardagh (FF)	Ben Briscoe (FF)	Pat Upton (Lab)	Gay Mitchell (FG)	4 seats 1992–2002
28th	1999 by-election	Seán Ardagh (FF)	Ben Briscoe (FF)	Mary Upton (Lab)	Gay Mitchell (FG)	4 seats 1992–2002
29th	2002	Seán Ardagh (FF)	Aengus Ó Snodaigh (SF)	Mary Upton (Lab)	Gay Mitchell (FG)	Michael Mulcahy (FF)
30th	2007	Seán Ardagh (FF)	Aengus Ó Snodaigh (SF)	Mary Upton (Lab)	Catherine Byrne (FG)	Michael Mulcahy (FF)
31st	2011	Eric Byrne (Lab)	Aengus Ó Snodaigh (SF)	Joan Collins (PBP)	Catherine Byrne (FG)	Michael Conaghan (Lab)
32nd	2016	Bríd Smith (AAA–PBP)	Aengus Ó Snodaigh (SF)	Joan Collins (Note: Founded Right to Change in May 2020.) (I4C)	Catherine Byrne (FG)	4 seats from 2016
33rd	2020	Bríd Smith (S–PBP)	Aengus Ó Snodaigh (SF)	Joan Collins (I4C)	Patrick Costello (GP)	4 seats from 2016
34th	2024	Catherine Ardagh (FF)	Aengus Ó Snodaigh (SF)	Máire Devine (SF)	Jen Cummins (SD)	4 seats from 2016
