= 1994 Irish local elections =

Election for boroughs, urban districts and towns

The 1994 Irish local elections for borough and town councillors and commissioners were held on Thursday, 9 June 1994. The election to the urban district council in Castlebar was postponed to Saturday, 18 June 1994 due to the death of a candidate. There was no poll for Cootehill, as there were nine candidates for the nine town commissioners.

Elections to county councils and county borough corporations had been held in 1991. The municipal elections were postponed in 1991 to allow for the enactment of legislation affecting the boundaries of many towns. This occurred under the Local Government Act 1994. This was therefore the first elections to these authorities since the 1985 local elections. Since that date, the Progressive Democrats had been established in 1985, Democratic Left had been established in 1992, and Sinn Féin had registered in 1986.

The 1994 European Parliament election, Údarás na Gaeltachta election, and Dáil by-elections in Dublin South-Central and Mayo West were held on the same day.

== Results ==
The total electorate was 429,431, from which 251,605 votes were cast, giving a turnout of 58.59%. There were 2,555 spoilt votes.

| Party | 1st pref | FPv% | Seats | % seats |
|---|---|---|---|---|
| Fianna Fáil | 83,580 | 33.56 | 273 | 36.69 |
| Fine Gael | 48,871 | 19.62 | 174 | 23.39 |
| Labour | 31,697 | 12.73 | 77 | 10.35 |
| Sinn Féin | 9,865 | 3.96 | 24 | 3.23 |
| Progressive Democrats | 8,077 | 3.24 | 18 | 2.42 |
| Democratic Left | 6,264 | 2.52 | 11 | 1.48 |
| Green | 2,807 | 1.13 | 6 | 0.81 |
| SKIA | 531 | 0.21 | 1 | 0.13 |
| Workers' Party | 456 | 0.18 | 1 | 0.13 |
| Natural Law | 17 | 0.01 | 0 | 0 |
| Independent | 56,885 | 22.84 | 159 | 21.37 |
| Total | 249,050 | 100.00 | 744 | 100.00 |

=== Details ===
The council column notes the status of the authority: Borough corporation (BC), urban district council (UDC), or town commissioners (TC).

*: Town extended for electoral purposes under s. 17 of the Local Government Act 1994.

| Town | Council | Seats | FF | FG | Lab | SF | PD | DL | Green | Other |
|---|---|---|---|---|---|---|---|---|---|---|
| Clonmel | BC | 12 | 4 | 1 | 1 | | 1 | | | 5 |
| Drogheda | BC | 12 | 4 | 2 | 4 | | | | | 2 |
| Kilkenny | BC (Note: Kilkenny has city status for ceremonial purposes; for administrative purposes it was a borough.) | 12 | 5 | 3 | 2 | | | | | 2 |
| Sligo | BC | 12 | 3 | 3 | 2 | 2 | | | | 2 |
| Wexford | BC | 12 | 4 | 2 | 3 | | | 1 | | 2 |
| Arklow | UDC | 9 | 3 | 1 | 2 | | | | | 3 |
| Athlone | UDC | 9 | 4 | 2 | 1 | | | | | 2 |
| Athy | UDC | 9 | 3 | 2 | 2 | 2 | | | | |
| Ballina | UDC | 9 | 3 | 3 | | | | | | 3 |
| Ballinasloe | UDC | 9 | 4 | 4 | | | | | | 1 |
| Birr | UDC | 9 | 3 | 3 | | 1 | | | | 2 |
| Bray | UDC | 12 | 5 | 1 | 2 | | | 4 | | |
| Buncrana | UDC | 9 | 2 | 2 | | 1 | | | | 4 |
| Bundoran | UDC | 9 | 3 | 1 | | | | | | 5 |
| Carlow | UDC | 9 | 4 | 2 | 2 | | 1 | | | |
| Carrickmacross | UDC | 9 | 4 | 2 | | | | | | 3 (Note: Includes one Workers' Party) |
| Carrick-on-Suir | UDC | 9 | 3 | 2 | 1 | 1 | 1 | | | 1 |
| Cashel | UDC | 9 | 4 | 2 | 1 | 1 | | | | 1 |
| Castlebar | UDC | 9 | 3 | 3 | 1 | | | | | 2 |
| Castleblayney | UDC | 9 | 4 | 2 | | 1 | | | | 2 |
| Cavan | UDC | 9 | 5 | 3 | 1 | | | | | |
| Clonakilty | UDC | 9 | 4 | 1 | | 1 | 1 | | | 2 |
| Clones | UDC | 9 | 3 | 2 | | 3 | | | | 1 |
| Cobh | UDC | 9 | 2 | 2 | 1 | 1 | | | | 3 |
| Dundalk | UDC | 12 | 4 | 4 | | 1 | 1 | | | 2 |
| Dungarvan | UDC | 9 | 2 | 1 | 3 | | | 1 | | 2 |
| Ennis | UDC | 9 | 4 | 2 | 1 | | | | | 2 |
| Enniscorthy | UDC | 9 | 3 | 3 | | | | | | 3 |
| Fermoy | UDC | 9 | 4 | 2 | 1 | | 1 | | | 1 |
| Kells | UDC | 9 | 3 | 3 | 1 | | | | | 2 |
| Killarney | UDC | 9 | 4 | 1 | 1 | | | | | 3 (Note: Includes one South Kerry Independent Alliance) |
| Kilrush | UDC | 9 | 3 | 2 | 1 | | | | | 3 |
| Kinsale | UDC | 9 | 4 | 2 | 1 | | | | | 2 |
| Letterkenny | UDC | 9 | 4 | 1 | 1 | | | | | 3 |
| Listowel | UDC | 9 | 3 | 4 | | 1 | | | | 1 |
| Longford | UDC | 9 | 4 | 3 | | | | | | 2 |
| Macroom | UDC | 9 | 4 | 3 | 1 | | | | | 1 |
| Mallow | UDC | 9 | 3 | 2 | 1 | | | 2 | | 1 |
| Midleton | UDC | 9 | 3 | 2 | | | 1 | | | 3 |
| Monaghan | UDC | 9 | 2 | 2 | | 3 | | | | 2 |
| Naas | UDC | 9 | 3 | 1 | | | 1 | | 1 | 3 |
| Navan | UDC | 9 | 3 | 2 | 1 | 1 | | 1 | | 1 |
| Nenagh | UDC | 9 | 4 | 1 | 2 | | | | | 2 |
| New Ross | UDC | 9 | 3 | 1 | 2 | | 1 | | | 2 |
| Skibbereen | UDC | 9 | 2 | 2 | 1 | | | | | 4 |
| Templemore | UDC | 9 | 2 | 4 | | | | | | 3 |
| Thurles | UDC | 9 | 3 | 4 | 1 | | | | | 1 |
| Tipperary | UDC | 9 | 4 | 1 | 2 | | | | | 2 |
| Tralee | UDC | 12 | 3 (Note: The Department of the Environment results document erroneously gives (p. 115) 4 seats for Fianna Fáil and 3 for Fine Gael. The count summary (p. 75) erroneously lists Norma Foley as Fine Gael. The count details (pp. 74–75) correctly show Foley as Fianna Fáil, who won 3 seats, and that Fine Gael won 2 seats.) | 2 | 3 | 1 | | | 1 | 2 |
| Trim | UDC | 9 | 4 | 1 | 2 | | | | | 2 |
| Tullamore | UDC | 9 | 3 | 2 | 3 | | | | | 1 |
| Westport | UDC | 9 | 4 | 4 | | | | | | 1 |
| Wicklow | UDC | 9 | 2 | 1 | 3 | | | | | 3 |
| Youghal | UDC | 9 | 2 | 1 | | 1 | | | 1 | 4 |
| Ardee | TC | 9 | 3 | 1 | 1 | | 2 | | | 2 |
| Balbriggan | TC | 9 | 1 | 1 | 3 | | | | 1 | 3 |
| Ballybay | TC | 9 | 4 | 2 | | 1 | | | | 2 |
| Ballyshannon | TC | 9 | 3 | 4 | | | | | | 2 |
| Bandon | TC | 9 | 5 | 3 | 1 | | | | | |
| Bantry | TC | 9 | 3 | 3 | | | | | | 3 |
| Belturbet | TC | 9 | 4 | 3 | | | | | | 2 |
| Boyle | TC | 9 | 4 | 3 | | | | | | 2 |
| Cootehill | TC | 9 | 5 | 4 | | | | | | |
| Edenderry | TC | 9 | 4 | 1 | | | 1 | | | 3 |
| Gorey | TC | 9 | 3 | 4 | 1 | | | | | 1 |
| Granard | TC | 9 | 3 | 1 | | | | | | 5 |
| Greystones | TC | 9 | 2 | 2 | | | | | 1 | 4 |
| Kilkee | TC | 9 | 5 | 3 | | | 1 | | | |
| Leixlip | TC | 9 | 3 | 1 | 1 | | 1 | 2 | | 1 |
| Lismore | TC | 9 | 2 | 4 | 1 | | | | | 2 |
| Loughrea | TC | 9 | 4 | 2 | | | 1 | | | 2 |
| Mountmellick | TC | 9 | 6 | 3 | | | | | | |
| Muine Bheag | TC | 9 | 5 | 2 | 2 | | | | | |
| Mullingar | TC | 9 | 3 | | 4 | | 1 | | | 1 |
| Newbridge | TC | 9 | 4 | 2 | 1 | | | | | 2 |
| Passage West | TC | 9 | 2 | 3 | 1 | | | | 1 | 2 |
| Portlaoise | TC | 9 | 6 | 2 | | | | | | 1 |
| Shannon | TC | 9 | 2 | 2 | 1 | 1 | | | | 3 |
| Tramore | TC | 9 | 3 | 2 | 1 | | | | | 3 |
| Tuam | TC | 9 | 2 | 1 | 1 | | 2 | | | 3 |
