= Michael Ring =

Irish former politician (born 1953)

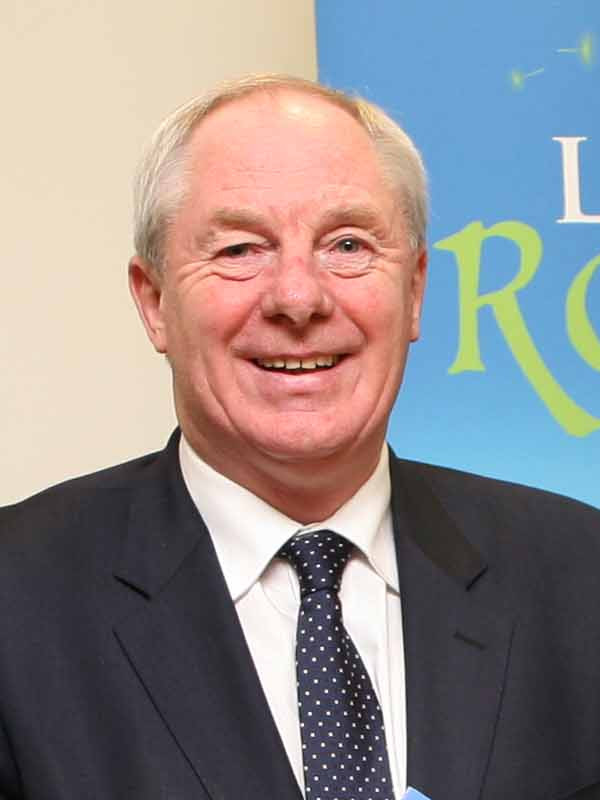
- Ring in 2012

Minister for Rural and Community Development
- In office 14 June 2017 – 27 June 2020
- Taoiseach: Leo Varadkar
- Preceded by: New office
- Succeeded by: Heather Humphreys

Minister of State
- 2016–2017: Arts, Heritage, Regional, Rural and Gaeltacht Affairs
- 2011–2016: Transport, Tourism and Sport

Teachta Dála
- In office June 1997 – November 2024
- Constituency: Mayo
- In office June 1994 – June 1997
- Constituency: Mayo West

Personal details
- Born: 24 December 1953 (age 72) Westport, County Mayo, Ireland
- Party: Fine Gael
- Spouse: Anne Fitzgerald (m. 1992)
- Children: 3
- Education: University College Galway

Michael Ring (born 24 December 1953) is an Irish former Fine Gael politician who served as a Teachta Dála (TD) for the Mayo constituency from 1997 to 2024, and previously from 1994 to 1997 for the Mayo West constituency. He served as Minister for Rural and Community Development from 2017 to 2020 and as a Minister of State from 2011 to 2017.

== Early and personal life ==
Ring was born in Westport, County Mayo, in 1953. He was educated at Westport CBS and the local vocational school. He later worked as an estate agent and auctioneer in Westport.

== Political career ==
Ring was unsuccessful as a Fine Gael candidate in the Mayo West constituency in the 1992 general election. However, he was elected at his second attempt in a 1994 by-election.

He was appointed to the Fine Gael Front Bench in 2002, as Spokesperson on Social and Family Affairs. Ring stepped down from the Front Bench in 2004, after an expected demotion, however, he returned in 2007 as Spokesperson on Community, Rural and Gaeltacht Affairs.

On 10 March 2011, he was appointed as Minister of State at the Department of Transport, Tourism and Sport with responsibility for Tourism and Sport by the coalition government of Fine Gael and the Labour Party led by Ring's constituency colleague Enda Kenny. This appointment lasted until the formation of a new government on 6 May.

On 19 May 2016, he was appointed as Minister of State at the Department of Arts, Heritage, Regional, Rural and Gaeltacht Affairs with responsibility for Regional Economic Development by the new minority government of Fine Gael and Independents led by Enda Kenny.

He was appointed to cabinet on 14 June 2017 as Minister for Rural and Community Development in the new minority government of Fine Gael and Independents led by Leo Varadkar. His appointment ended on 27 June 2020 on the formation of the new government.

On 30 July 2024, Ring announced that he would not contest the next general election.

Political offices
New office	Minister of State at the Department of Transport, Tourism and Sport; 2011–2016	Succeeded by Patrick O'Donovan
New office	Minister of State at the Department of Arts, Heritage, Regional, Rural and Gaeltacht Affairs; 2016–2017	Office abolished
New office	Minister for Rural and Community Development; 2017–2020	Succeeded by Heather Humphreys

Dáil	Election	Deputy (Party)	Deputy (Party)	Deputy (Party)
19th	1969	Mícheál Ó Móráin (FF)	Joseph Lenehan (FF)	Henry Kenny (FG)
20th	1973	Denis Gallagher (FF)	Myles Staunton (FG)	Henry Kenny (FG)
20th	1975 by-election	Denis Gallagher (FF)	Myles Staunton (FG)	Enda Kenny (FG)
21st	1977	Denis Gallagher (FF)	Pádraig Flynn (FF)	Enda Kenny (FG)
22nd	1981	Denis Gallagher (FF)	Pádraig Flynn (FF)	Enda Kenny (FG)
23rd	1982 (Feb)	Denis Gallagher (FF)	Pádraig Flynn (FF)	Enda Kenny (FG)
24th	1982 (Nov)	Denis Gallagher (FF)	Pádraig Flynn (FF)	Enda Kenny (FG)
25th	1987	Denis Gallagher (FF)	Pádraig Flynn (FF)	Enda Kenny (FG)
26th	1989	Martin O'Toole (FF)	Pádraig Flynn (FF)	Enda Kenny (FG)
27th	1992	Séamus Hughes (FF)	Pádraig Flynn (FF)	Enda Kenny (FG)
27th	1994 by-election	Séamus Hughes (FF)	Michael Ring (FG)	Enda Kenny (FG)
28th	1997	Constituency abolished. See Mayo		

Dáil	Election	Deputy (Party)	Deputy (Party)	Deputy (Party)	Deputy (Party)	Deputy (Party)
28th	1997	Beverley Flynn (FF)	Tom Moffatt (FF)	Enda Kenny (FG)	Michael Ring (FG)	Jim Higgins (FG)
29th	2002	Beverley Flynn (FF)	John Carty (FF)	Enda Kenny (FG)	Michael Ring (FG)	Jerry Cowley (Ind.)
30th	2007	Beverley Flynn (Ind.)	Dara Calleary (FF)	Enda Kenny (FG)	Michael Ring (FG)	John O'Mahony (FG)
31st	2011	Michelle Mulherin (FG)	Dara Calleary (FF)	Enda Kenny (FG)	Michael Ring (FG)	John O'Mahony (FG)
32nd	2016	Lisa Chambers (FF)	Dara Calleary (FF)	Enda Kenny (FG)	Michael Ring (FG)	4 seats 2016–2024
33rd	2020	Rose Conway-Walsh (SF)	Dara Calleary (FF)	Alan Dillon (FG)	Michael Ring (FG)	4 seats 2016–2024
34th	2024	Rose Conway-Walsh (SF)	Dara Calleary (FF)	Alan Dillon (FG)	Keira Keogh (FG)	Paul Lawless (Aon)
