= Democratic Left (Ireland) =

Left-wing party in Ireland from 1992 to 1999

Democratic Left Daonlathas Clé
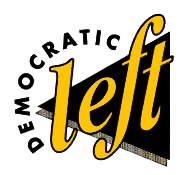
- Leader: Proinsias De Rossa
- Founded: March 1992
- Dissolved: 1999
- Split from: Workers' Party
- Merged into: Labour Party
- Ideology: Democratic socialism Social democracy
- Political position: Left-wing
- European Parliament group: European United Left

Democratic Left (Irish: Daonlathas Clé) was a left-wing political party in Ireland between 1992 and 1999. It came into being after a split in the Workers' Party, and after seven years in existence it was incorporated into the Labour Party in 1999. Democratic Left served in a three-party coalition government with Fine Gael and the Labour Party, termed the Rainbow Coalition, from December 1994 to June 1997.

== Origins ==
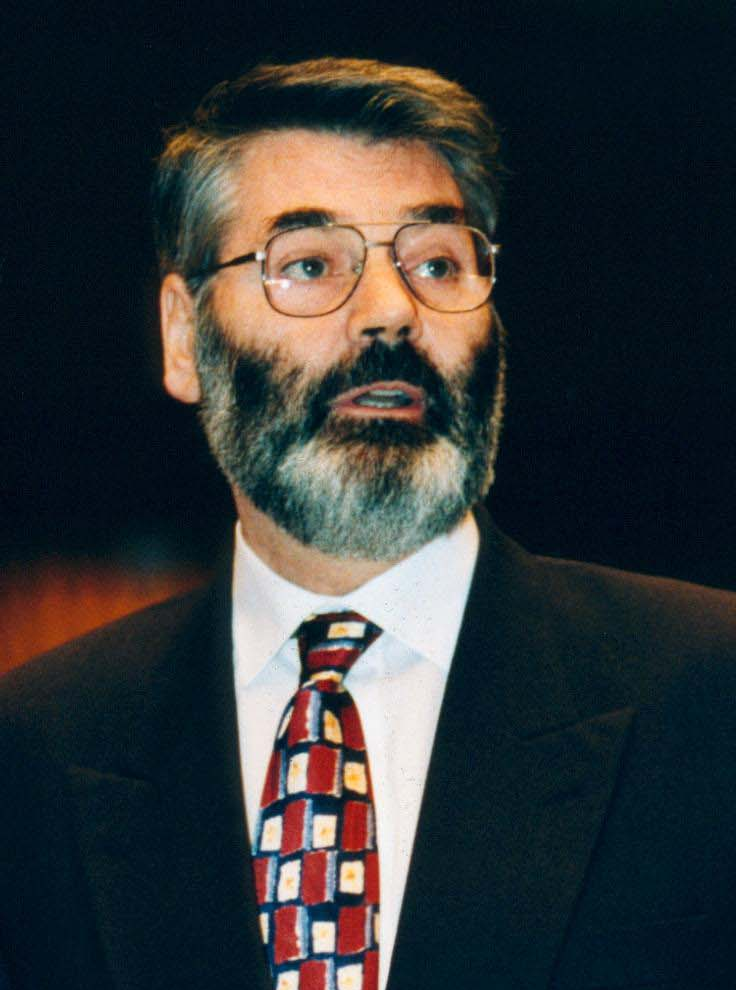
Proinsias de Rossa led his faction out of the Workers' Party and into what became Democratic Left

Democratic Left was formed after a split in the Workers' Party, which in turn had its origins in the 1970 split in Sinn Féin. Although never formally styled as a communist party, the Workers' Party had an internal organisation based on democratic centralism, strong links with the Soviet Union, and campaigned for socialist policies. The party gained support during the 1980s - a decade of cutbacks and hardship in Ireland - winning 7 TDs in the 1989 general election and 24 councillors in the 1991 local elections.

However between 1989 and 1992 the Workers' Party was beset by a number of problems. The collapse of communism in eastern Europe had put many Soviet-aligned parties on the defensive and had caused a number of them to reconsider their core ideological beliefs. A faction led by Proinsias De Rossa wanted to move the party towards an acceptance of free-market economics, viewing the party's Marxist stance as an obstacle to further electoral success. The party was languishing in opinion polls and there was increasing tension between the party's elected representatives such as De Rossa, Pat Rabbitte and Eamon Gilmore and another grouping involving activists and organisers on the party's Central Executive Committee, led by Sean Garland. Finally the broadcast of a BBC Spotlight programme in June 1991 had raised questions on the party's links to the Official IRA. The Official IRA had been on ceasefire since 1972 but was frequently accused of being involved in fund-raising robberies, money-laundering and other forms of criminality.

On 15 February 1992, a special conference was held in Dún Laoghaire to reconstitute the party. Over the preceding two weeks there were clashes at a number of party meetings between supporters of De Rossa and Garland. A motion proposed by De Rossa and general secretary Des Geraghty sought to stand down the existing membership, elect an 11-member provisional executive council and make several other significant changes in party structures. Initially supporters believed that the motion would pass but it was defeated by 9 votes. After the announcement of the results, De Rossa told the delegates "You have your decision. I honestly believe it is a bad decision, but you have made it,". Both sides accused each other "packing votes".

== Formation ==
After the conference it was clear a split was inevitable. At an Ard Chomhairle meeting held on 22 February in Wynns Hotel in Dublin City, six of the party's TDs resigned from the party along with more than half of the Ard Chomhairle. The members who left included the party leader Proinsias De Rossa and five more of the party's seven members of Dáil Éireann (Pat Rabbitte, Eamon Gilmore, Eric Byrne, Pat McCartan and Joe Sherlock). The party's president for most of the previous 30 years, Tomás Mac Giolla refused to join the breakaway and remained with the Workers' Party although he had reluctantly supported the constitutional amendments and had considered departing the party after the conference. The new party was provisionally named New Agenda with De Rossa becoming leader of the new party.

There was speculation that the Labour TD Emmet Stagg would join the new grouping. Stagg, who was on the left of the Labour Party, had resigned the party whip before the Workers' Party split and it was indicated that he might join the new group. However Stagg eventually opted not to join. The party was hampered by the fact that it immediately lost Dáil privileges such as speaking rights, the ability to table priority questions and the allocation of private members time it had enjoyed as the Workers' Party as it did not meet the minimum requirement of 7 TDs. The new party did not qualify for the party leader's allowance scheme depriving it of a vital source of funding.

The party was renamed Democratic Left at its founding conference held on 28 March 1992. The new party was defined as:

[A] democratic socialist party. We believe that the idea of socialism coupled with the practice of democracy provides the basis for the radical transformation of Irish society. We aim to be a feminist party. An environmental party. A party of the unemployed and low-paid. A champion of personal freedom. A friend and ally of the third world. An integral part of the European Left.

== Electoral history and participation in government ==
The party's first contest was the 1992 UK general election, in which it stood in two constituencies in Northern Ireland and polled 2,133 votes. The election was fought under the label of New Agenda.

In the North the party contested elections in 1996 for the Northern Ireland Forum but with less than 1% of the vote they failed to have any members elected. The party inherited two councillors at its foundation: Seamus Lynch lost his Belfast City Council seat in 1993, Gerry Cullen had been elected for the Workers' Party in 1989 in Dungannon Town and was re-elected in 1993 and 1997 local elections.

In the 1992 Irish general election the party lost two of its six Dáil seats (Eric Byrne narrowly following a week of counting and recounting, Pat McCartan and Joe Sherlock losing their seats, and Liz McManus winning a seat in Wicklow), gaining 2.8% of the vote compared to 5% for the pre-split Workers' Party in the preceding general election.

Joe Sherlock was elected on the Labour Panel to Seanad Éireann as part of an election pact with their politically polar opposites Progressive Democrats.

The party subsequently won two seats in by-elections, Eric Byrne regaining his seat in Dublin South Central and Kathleen Lynch in Cork North Central.

After the collapse of the Fianna Fáil-Labour Party coalition government in 1994, Democratic Left joined the new coalition government with Fine Gael and the Labour Party. Proinsias De Rossa served as Minister for Social Welfare, initiating Ireland's first national anti-poverty strategy.

== Election results ==
=== Dáil Éireann ===
Election	Leader	1st pref votes	%	Seats	±	Government
1992	Proinsias De Rossa	47,945	2.8	4 / 166		Opposition (Nov 1992–Dec 1994)
1992	Proinsias De Rossa	47,945	2.8	4 / 166		Government (Dec 1994–Jun 1997): FG-Lab-DL Rainbow Coalition
1997	Proinsias De Rossa	44,900 ▼	2.5 ▼	4 / 166	0	Opposition

=== House of Commons ===
Election	Leader	Votes	%	Seats (out of NI total)	±	Government
1992	Proinsias De Rossa	2,133	0.3	0 / 18		No seats

=== Northern Ireland Forum for Political Dialogue ===
Election	Leader	Votes	%	Seats
1996	Proinsias De Rossa	1,215	0.2	0 / 110

=== Local elections (Republic of Ireland) ===
Election	1st pref Votes	%	Seats	+/–
1994	6,264	2.5	11 / 744	

=== Local elections (Northern Ireland) ===
Election	1st pref Votes	%	Seats	+/–
1993	2,288	0.4	1 / 582	
1997	560 ▼	0.1 ▼	1 / 584	Steady

=== European Parliament (Republic of Ireland) ===
Election	1st pref Votes	%	Seats	+/–
1994	39,706	3.5	0 / 15	

== Merger with Labour ==
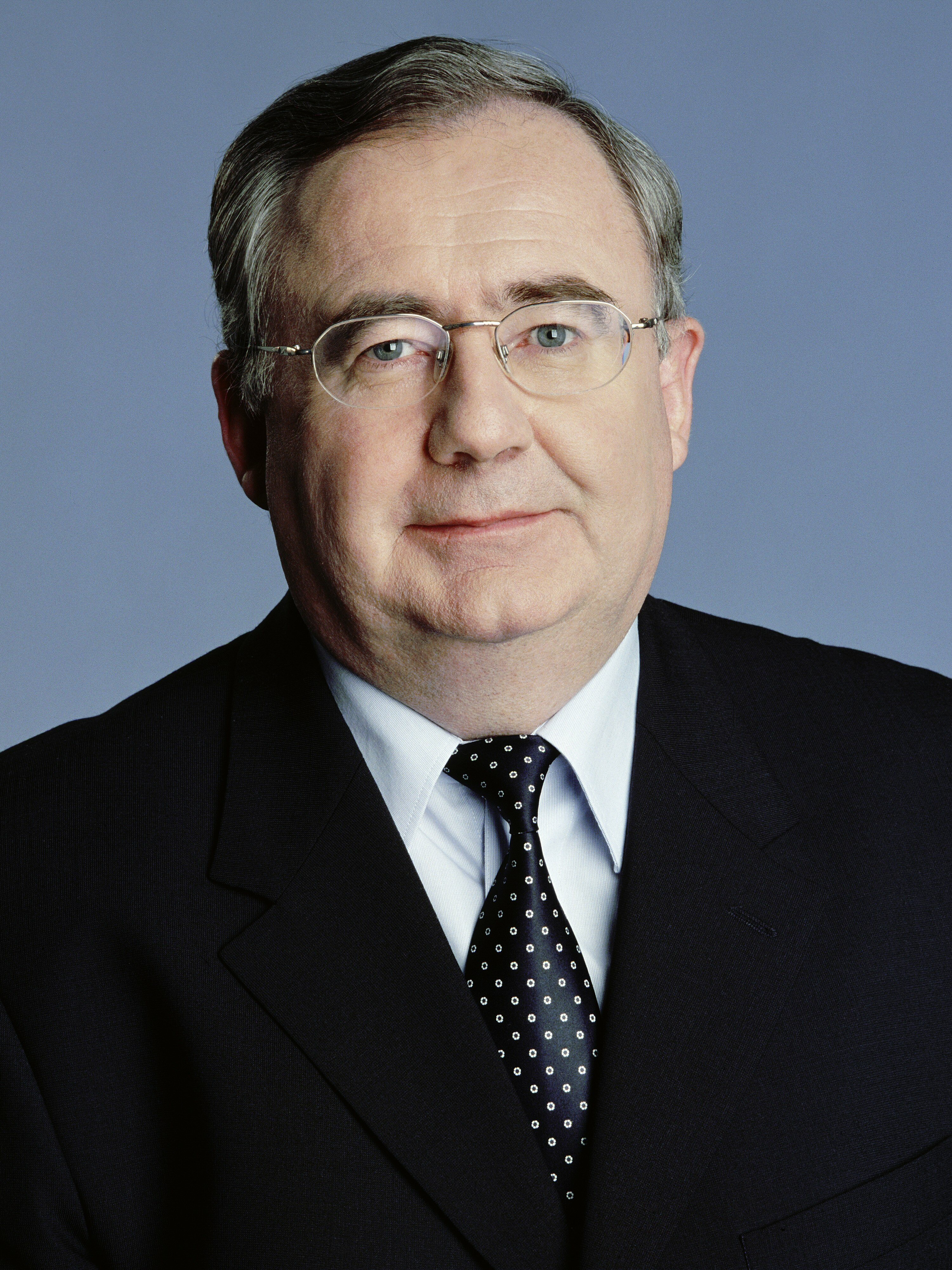
Pat Rabbitte

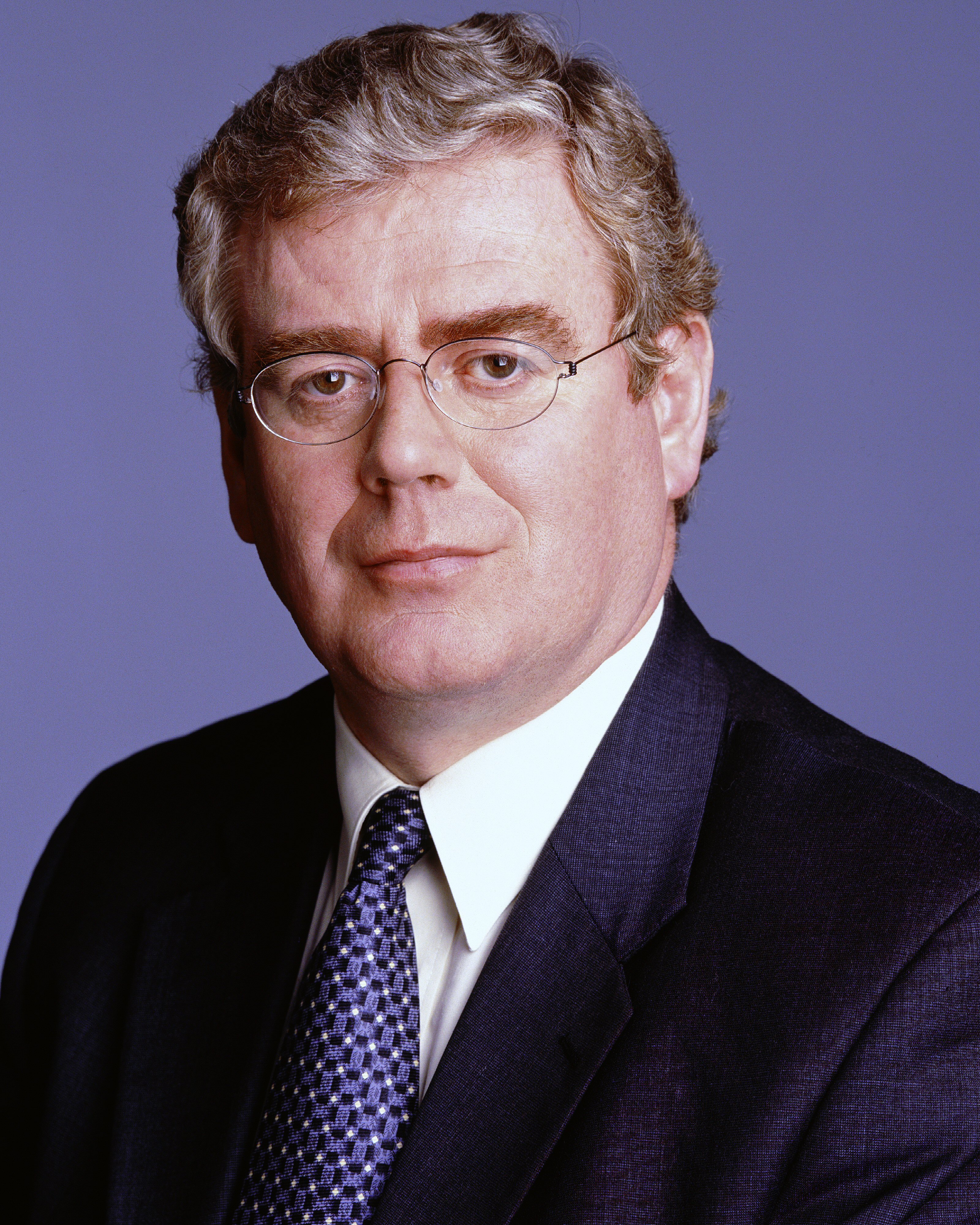
Eamon Gilmore

Pat Rabbitte and Eamon Gilmore, both members of Democratic Left, would later become leaders of the Labour Party following the merger of the two entities

In the 1997 general election Democratic Left lost two of its six seats, both of its by-election victors being unseated. The party won 2.5% of the vote. The party also was in significant financial debt because of a lack of access to public funds, due to its size. Between 1998 and 1999 the party entered discussions with the Labour Party which culminated in the parties' merger in 1999, keeping the name of the larger partner but excluding members in Northern Ireland from organising. This left Gerry Cullen, their councillor in Dungannon Borough Council, in a state of limbo, representing a party for whom he could no longer seek election. The launch of the merged party was in the Pillar Room of the Rotunda Hospital in Dublin on 24 January 1999. Labour Party leader Ruairi Quinn remained leader of the unified party, while De Rossa took up the largely titular position of party president. Only 10% of Democratic Left delegates at the special conference had voted against the merger. In 1999 De Rossa successfully contested the European Parliament election in Dublin. He held his Dáil seat until he stood down at the 2002 general election. He held his European Parliament seat in the 2004 election and 2009 election

In 2002, the former Democratic Left TDs Pat Rabbitte and Liz McManus were elected as Labour Party leader and deputy leader respectively. When Rabbite stepped down as Labour leader after the 2007 general election, Gilmore was elected unopposed as his successor.

== Historical archives ==
The party archives were donated to the National Library of Ireland by the Labour Party in 2014. The records can be accessed by means of the call number: MS 49,807.

== See also ==
- Category:Democratic Left (Ireland) politicians
