= 31st Dáil =

TDs from 2011 to 2016

←	30th Dáil	32nd Dáil	→

Overview
- Legislative body: Dáil Éireann
- Jurisdiction: Ireland
- Meeting place: Leinster House
- Term: 9 March 2011 – 3 February 2016
- Election: 2011 general election
- Government: 29th government of Ireland
- Members: 166
- Ceann Comhairle: Seán Barrett
- Leas-Cheann Comhairle: Michael P. Kitt
- Taoiseach: Enda Kenny
- Tánaiste: Joan Burton — Eamon Gilmore until 4 July 2014
- Chief Whip: Paul Kehoe
- Leader of the Opposition: Micheál Martin

Sessions
- 1st: 9 March 2011 – 21 July 2011
- 2nd: 14 September 2011 – 19 July 2012
- 3rd: 18 September 2012 – 18 July 2013
- 4th: 18 September 2013 – 17 July 2014
- 5th: 17 September 2014 – 16 July 2015
- 6th: 22 September 2015 – 3 February 2016

The 31st Dáil was elected at the 2011 general election on 25 February 2011 and first met at midday on 9 March 2011 in Leinster House. The members of Dáil Éireann, the house of representatives of the Oireachtas (legislature) of Ireland, are known as TDs. It sat with the 24th Seanad as the two Houses of the Oireachtas.

The 2011 election saw 17 Dáil constituencies return 3 TDs each, 15 constituencies return 4 TDs each and 11 constituencies return 5 TDs each, for a total of 166. Seán Barrett was elected as Ceann Comhairle in the first sitting of the Dáil. For the first time, Fine Gael, led by Enda Kenny, became the largest party. It formed a coalition government with the Labour Party, led by Eamon Gilmore, who had achieved their highest number of seats in the party's history. In July 2014, Joan Burton won a Labour Party leadership election to become the leader of the Labour Party and Tánaiste.

Fianna Fáil secured 20 seats, the lowest in the party's history, and was the largest opposition party. The leader of the party, Micheál Martin became the Leader of the Opposition. Gerry Adams as leader of Sinn Féin became the second opposition leader. A technical group was formed following the election composed of 16 independent politicians and members of the United Left Alliance, who failed to win enough seats to gain speaking rights.

Almost half of the members of the 30th Dáil were absent from the 31st: 31 members retired before the poll and a further 45 TDs lost their seats at the election. 76 new TDs were elected to the Dáil, 46% of the total.

The 31st Dáil was dissolved by President Michael D. Higgins on 3 February 2016, at the request of the Taoiseach Enda Kenny. The 31st Dáil lasted 4 years, 331 days.

== Composition of the 31st Dáil ==
- 29th government coalition parties

Party	Feb. 2011	Jan. 2016	Change
Fine Gael	76	66	▼10
Labour	37	33	▼4
Fianna Fáil	20	21	▲1
Sinn Féin	14	14	Steady
Socialist Party (Note: The Socialist Party changed their branding to the Anti-Austerity Alliance in 2014. AAA and People Before Profit formed an electoral alliance which was registered as a political party in 2015.)	2	—N/a	▼2
People Before Profit	2	—N/a	▼2
Workers and Unemployed	1	1	Steady
Independent Alliance	—N/a	5	▲5
AAA–PBP	—N/a	4	▲4
Renua	—N/a	3	▲3
Social Democrats	—N/a	3	▲3
Independent	14	14	Steady
Ceann Comhairle	—N/a	1	▲1
Vacant	—N/a	1	▲1
Total	166		

Fine Gael and the Labour Party formed a two-thirds 'supermajority' government with 68% of all TDs in the Dáil being part upon its formation. Through resignations and deaths, it would be reduced to a majority of 99 TDs (60% of Dáil). It holds the record for largest government majority in Irish history.

While the two parties were the 1st and 2nd largest parties in the Dáil, it was not considered a grand coalition. Fine Gael and Fianna Fáil were traditionally rivals, while Labour was typically Fine Gael's coalition partner. Fianna Fáil and Fine Gael would form a grand coalition with the Green Party as a junior partner in 33rd Dáil.

Fine Gael leader Enda Kenny became the Taoiseach and Labour Party leader Eamon Gilmore became the Tánaiste.

=== Graphical representation ===
The following illustrates the composition of the 31st Dáil at the time of its first sitting on 9 March 2011 (after Seán Barrett (Fine Gael) took office as Ceann Comhairle). This is not the official seating plan. The government parties sit to the left of the Ceann Comhairle and opposition parties sit to the right.

The following illustrates the composition at the time of its dissolution in February 2016.

Government

- Fine Gael
- Labour Party

Opposition

- Fianna Fáil
- Sinn Féin
- Anti-Austerity Alliance–People Before Profit
  - Anti-Austerity Alliance
    - Socialist Party
  - People Before Profit Alliance
- Renua
- Social Democrats
- Workers and Unemployed Action Group (later Workers and Unemployed Action)
- Independent
- Vacant seat

Note

The Socialist Party, People Before Profit Alliance, Workers and Unemployed Action Group and some Independent TDs sat together as a technical group, which was later joined by Renua and the Social Democrats.

== Ceann Comhairle ==
On 9 March 2011, Seán Barrett (FG) was proposed by Enda Kenny for the position of Ceann Comhairle. He was approved without a vote.

- Leas-Cheann Comhairle: Michael Kitt (Fianna Fáil)

== Leadership ==
=== Government ===
- Taoiseach and Leader of Fine Gael: Enda Kenny
  - Government Chief Whip and Fine Gael Chief whip: Paul Kehoe
- Tánaiste and Leader of the Labour Party: Joan Burton
  - Labour Party Chief whip: Emmet Stagg

=== Opposition ===
- Leader of the Opposition and Leader of Fianna Fáil: Micheál Martin
  - Fianna Fáil Chief whip: Seán Ó Fearghaíl
- Leader of Sinn Féin: Gerry Adams
  - Sinn Féin Chief Whip: Aengus Ó Snodaigh

=== Committees ===
- Chairman of the Oireachtas Joint Committee on Agriculture, Food and the Marine: Andrew Doyle (Fine Gael)
  - Vice Chairman of the Oireachtas Joint Committee on Agriculture, Food and the Marine: Pat Deering (Fine Gael)
- Chairwoman of the Oireachtas Joint Committee on Education and Social Protection: Joanna Tuffy (Labour Party)
  - Vice Chairman of the Oireachtas Joint Committee on Education and Social Protection: Aodhán Ó Ríordáin (Labour Party)
- Chairman of the Oireachtas Joint Committee on Environment, Culture and the Gaeltacht: Michael McCarthy (Labour Party)
  - Vice Chairman of the Oireachtas Joint Committee on Environment, Culture and the Gaeltacht: Noel Coonan (Fine Gael)
- Chairman of the Oireachtas Joint Committee on European Affairs: Dominic Hannigan (Labour Party)
  - Vice Chairman of the Oireachtas Joint Committee on European Affairs: Dara Murphy (Fine Gael)
- Chairman of the Oireachtas Joint Committee on Finance, Public Expenditure and Reform: Ciarán Lynch (Labour Party)
  - Vice Chairman of the Oireachtas Joint Committee on Finance, Public Expenditure and Reform: Liam Twomey (Fine Gael)
- Chairman of the Oireachtas Joint Committee on Foreign Affairs and Trade: Pat Breen (Fine Gael)
  - Vice Chairman of the Oireachtas Joint Committee on Foreign Affairs and Trade: Bernard Durkan (Fine Gael)
- Chairman of the Oireachtas Joint Committee on Health and Children: Jerry Buttimer (Fine Gael)
  - Vice Chairman of the Oireachtas Joint Committee on Health and Children: Ciara Conway (Labour Party)
- Chairman of the Oireachtas Joint Committee on the Implementation of the Good Friday Agreement: Joe McHugh (Fine Gael)
  - Vice Chairman of the Oireachtas Joint Committee on the Implementation of the Good Friday Agreement: Joe O'Reilly (Fine Gael)
- Chairman of the Oireachtas Joint Committee of Inquiry: Ciarán Lynch (Labour Party)
- Chairman of the Oireachtas Joint Committee on Public Service Oversight and Petitions: Pádraig Mac Lochlainn (Sinn Féin)
  - Vice Chairman of the Oireachtas Joint Committee on Public Service Oversight and Petitions: Derek Nolan (Labour Party)
- Chairman of the Oireachtas Joint Committee on Jobs, Enterprise and Innovation: Damien English (Fine Gael)
  - Vice Chairman of the Oireachtas Joint Committee on Jobs, Enterprise and Innovation: John Lyons (Labour Party)
- Chairman of the Oireachtas Select Committee on Members' Interests of Dáil Éireann: Thomas Pringle (Independent)
- Chairman of the Oireachtas Select Committee on Procedure and Privileges (Dáil): Seán Barrett (Fine Gael)
  - Chairman of the Oireachtas Joint Sub-Committee on Administration: Joe Carey (Fine Gael)
  - Chairman of the Oireachtas Sub-Committee on Dáil Reform: Paul Kehoe (Fine Gael)
  - Chairman of the Oireachtas Sub-Committee on Privileges: Emmet Stagg (Labour Party)
- Chairman of the Oireachtas Public Accounts Committee: John McGuinness (Fianna Fáil)
  - Vice Chairman of the Oireachtas Public Accounts Committee: Kieran O'Donnell (Fine Gael)
- Chairman of the Oireachtas Joint Committee on Transport and Communications: John O'Mahony (Fine Gael)
  - Vice Chairman of the Oireachtas Joint Committee on Transport and Communications: Paudie Coffey (Fine Gael)
- Chairman of the Oireachtas Joint Committee on Standing Orders (Private Business): Denis O'Donovan (Fianna Fáil) – Senator

== List of TDs ==
This is a list of TDs elected to Dáil Éireann in the 2011 general election, sorted by party. Note this table is a record of the 2011 general election results. The Changes table below records all changes in party affiliation.

+: Elected for the first time at the 2011 general election.
§: Returned automatically without standing for election as outgoing Ceann Comhairle, in accordance with Article 16.6 of the Constitution of Ireland.

Party	Name	Constituency
Fine Gael (76)	James Bannon	Longford–Westmeath
Fine Gael (76)	Seán Barrett	Dún Laoghaire
Fine Gael (76)	Tom Barry	Cork East
Fine Gael (76)	Pat Breen	Clare
Fine Gael (76)	Richard Bruton	Dublin North-Central
Fine Gael (76)	Ray Butler	Meath West
Fine Gael (76)	Jerry Buttimer	Cork South-Central
Fine Gael (76)	Catherine Byrne	Dublin South-Central
Fine Gael (76)	Ciarán Cannon	Galway East
Fine Gael (76)	Joe Carey	Clare
Fine Gael (76)	Paudie Coffey	Waterford
Fine Gael (76)	Áine Collins	Cork North-West
Fine Gael (76)	Seán Conlan	Cavan–Monaghan
Fine Gael (76)	Paul Connaughton Jnr	Galway East
Fine Gael (76)	Noel Coonan	Tipperary North
Fine Gael (76)	Marcella Corcoran Kennedy	Laois–Offaly
Fine Gael (76)	Simon Coveney	Cork South-Central
Fine Gael (76)	Michael Creed	Cork North-West
Fine Gael (76)	Lucinda Creighton	Dublin South-East
Fine Gael (76)	Jim Daly	Cork South-West
Fine Gael (76)	John Deasy	Waterford
Fine Gael (76)	Jimmy Deenihan	Kerry North–West Limerick
Fine Gael (76)	Pat Deering	Carlow–Kilkenny
Fine Gael (76)	Regina Doherty	Meath East
Fine Gael (76)	Paschal Donohoe	Dublin Central
Fine Gael (76)	Andrew Doyle	Wicklow
Fine Gael (76)	Bernard Durkan	Kildare North
Fine Gael (76)	Damien English	Meath West
Fine Gael (76)	Alan Farrell	Dublin North
Fine Gael (76)	Frank Feighan	Roscommon–South Leitrim
Fine Gael (76)	Frances Fitzgerald	Dublin Mid-West
Fine Gael (76)	Peter Fitzpatrick	Louth
Fine Gael (76)	Charles Flanagan	Laois–Offaly
Fine Gael (76)	Terence Flanagan	Dublin North-East
Fine Gael (76)	Brendan Griffin	Kerry South
Fine Gael (76)	Noel Harrington	Cork South-West
Fine Gael (76)	Simon Harris	Wicklow
Fine Gael (76)	Brian Hayes	Dublin South-West
Fine Gael (76)	Tom Hayes	Tipperary South
Fine Gael (76)	Martin Heydon	Kildare South
Fine Gael (76)	Phil Hogan	Carlow–Kilkenny
Fine Gael (76)	Heather Humphreys	Cavan–Monaghan
Fine Gael (76)	Derek Keating	Dublin Mid-West
Fine Gael (76)	Paul Kehoe	Wexford
Fine Gael (76)	Enda Kenny	Mayo
Fine Gael (76)	Seán Kyne	Galway West
Fine Gael (76)	Anthony Lawlor	Kildare North
Fine Gael (76)	Peter Mathews	Dublin South
Fine Gael (76)	Shane McEntee	Meath East
Fine Gael (76)	Nicky McFadden	Longford–Westmeath
Fine Gael (76)	Dinny McGinley	Donegal South-West
Fine Gael (76)	Joe McHugh	Donegal North-East
Fine Gael (76)	Tony McLoughlin	Sligo–North Leitrim
Fine Gael (76)	Olivia Mitchell	Dublin South
Fine Gael (76)	Mary Mitchell O'Connor	Dún Laoghaire
Fine Gael (76)	Michelle Mulherin	Mayo
Fine Gael (76)	Dara Murphy	Cork North-Central
Fine Gael (76)	Eoghan Murphy	Dublin South-East
Fine Gael (76)	Denis Naughten	Roscommon–South Leitrim
Fine Gael (76)	Dan Neville	Limerick
Fine Gael (76)	Michael Noonan	Limerick City
Fine Gael (76)	Kieran O'Donnell	Limerick City
Fine Gael (76)	Patrick O'Donovan	Limerick
Fine Gael (76)	Fergus O'Dowd	Louth
Fine Gael (76)	John O'Mahony	Mayo
Fine Gael (76)	Joe O'Reilly	Cavan–Monaghan
Fine Gael (76)	John Perry	Sligo–North Leitrim
Fine Gael (76)	John Paul Phelan	Carlow–Kilkenny
Fine Gael (76)	James Reilly	Dublin North
Fine Gael (76)	Michael Ring	Mayo
Fine Gael (76)	Alan Shatter	Dublin South
Fine Gael (76)	David Stanton	Cork East
Fine Gael (76)	Billy Timmins	Wicklow
Fine Gael (76)	Liam Twomey	Wexford
Fine Gael (76)	Leo Varadkar	Dublin West
Fine Gael (76)	Brian Walsh	Galway West
Labour Party (37)	Tommy Broughan	Dublin North-East
Labour Party (37)	Joan Burton	Dublin West
Labour Party (37)	Eric Byrne	Dublin South-Central
Labour Party (37)	Michael Conaghan	Dublin South-Central
Labour Party (37)	Ciara Conway	Waterford
Labour Party (37)	Joe Costello	Dublin Central
Labour Party (37)	Robert Dowds	Dublin Mid-West
Labour Party (37)	Anne Ferris	Wicklow
Labour Party (37)	Eamon Gilmore	Dún Laoghaire
Labour Party (37)	Dominic Hannigan	Meath East
Labour Party (37)	Brendan Howlin	Wexford
Labour Party (37)	Kevin Humphreys	Dublin South-East
Labour Party (37)	Colm Keaveney	Galway East
Labour Party (37)	Alan Kelly	Tipperary North
Labour Party (37)	Seán Kenny	Dublin North-East
Labour Party (37)	Ciarán Lynch	Cork South-Central
Labour Party (37)	Kathleen Lynch	Cork North-Central
Labour Party (37)	John Lyons	Dublin North-West
Labour Party (37)	Eamonn Maloney	Dublin South-West
Labour Party (37)	Michael McCarthy	Cork South-West
Labour Party (37)	Michael McNamara	Clare
Labour Party (37)	Ged Nash	Louth
Labour Party (37)	Derek Nolan	Galway West
Labour Party (37)	Aodhán Ó Ríordáin	Dublin North-Central
Labour Party (37)	Jan O'Sullivan	Limerick City
Labour Party (37)	Willie Penrose	Longford–Westmeath
Labour Party (37)	Ann Phelan	Carlow–Kilkenny
Labour Party (37)	Ruairi Quinn	Dublin South-East
Labour Party (37)	Pat Rabbitte	Dublin South-West
Labour Party (37)	Brendan Ryan	Dublin North
Labour Party (37)	Seán Sherlock	Cork East
Labour Party (37)	Róisín Shortall	Dublin North-West
Labour Party (37)	Arthur Spring	Kerry North–West Limerick
Labour Party (37)	Emmet Stagg	Kildare North
Labour Party (37)	Joanna Tuffy	Dublin Mid-West
Labour Party (37)	Jack Wall	Kildare South
Labour Party (37)	Alex White	Dublin South
Fianna Fáil (20)	John Browne	Wexford
Fianna Fáil (20)	Dara Calleary	Mayo
Fianna Fáil (20)	Niall Collins	Limerick
Fianna Fáil (20)	Barry Cowen	Laois–Offaly
Fianna Fáil (20)	Timmy Dooley	Clare
Fianna Fáil (20)	Seán Fleming	Laois–Offaly
Fianna Fáil (20)	Billy Kelleher	Cork North-Central
Fianna Fáil (20)	Séamus Kirk	Louth
Fianna Fáil (20)	Michael Kitt	Galway East
Fianna Fáil (20)	Brian Lenihan	Dublin West
Fianna Fáil (20)	Micheál Martin	Cork South-Central
Fianna Fáil (20)	Charlie McConalogue	Donegal North-East
Fianna Fáil (20)	Michael McGrath	Cork South-Central
Fianna Fáil (20)	John McGuinness	Carlow–Kilkenny
Fianna Fáil (20)	Michael Moynihan	Cork North-West
Fianna Fáil (20)	Éamon Ó Cuív	Galway West
Fianna Fáil (20)	Willie O'Dea	Limerick City
Fianna Fáil (20)	Seán Ó Fearghaíl	Kildare South
Fianna Fáil (20)	Brendan Smith	Cavan–Monaghan
Fianna Fáil (20)	Robert Troy	Longford–Westmeath
Sinn Féin (14)	Gerry Adams	Louth
Sinn Féin (14)	Michael Colreavy	Sligo–North Leitrim
Sinn Féin (14)	Seán Crowe	Dublin South-West
Sinn Féin (14)	Pearse Doherty	Donegal South-West
Sinn Féin (14)	Dessie Ellis	Dublin North-West
Sinn Féin (14)	Martin Ferris	Kerry North–West Limerick
Sinn Féin (14)	Mary Lou McDonald	Dublin Central
Sinn Féin (14)	Sandra McLellan	Cork East
Sinn Féin (14)	Pádraig Mac Lochlainn	Donegal North-East
Sinn Féin (14)	Jonathan O'Brien	Cork North-Central
Sinn Féin (14)	Caoimhghín Ó Caoláin	Cavan–Monaghan
Sinn Féin (14)	Aengus Ó Snodaigh	Dublin South-Central
Sinn Féin (14)	Brian Stanley	Laois–Offaly
Sinn Féin (14)	Peadar Tóibín	Meath West
People Before Profit (2)	Richard Boyd Barrett (Note: Members of the Socialist Party, the People Before Profit and Workers and Unemployed Action campaigned together under the banner of the United Left Alliance (ULA), but only their individual party names appeared on the ballot paper.)	Dún Laoghaire
People Before Profit (2)	Joan Collins	Dublin South-Central
Socialist Party (2)	Clare Daly	Dublin North
Socialist Party (2)	Joe Higgins	Dublin West
Workers and Unemployed Action (1)	Séamus Healy	Tipperary South
Independent (14)	Stephen Donnelly	Wicklow
Independent (14)	Luke 'Ming' Flanagan	Roscommon–South Leitrim
Independent (14)	Tom Fleming	Kerry South
Independent (14)	Noel Grealish	Galway West
Independent (14)	John Halligan	Waterford
Independent (14)	Michael Healy-Rae	Kerry South
Independent (14)	Michael Lowry	Tipperary North
Independent (14)	Finian McGrath	Dublin North-Central
Independent (14)	Mattie McGrath	Tipperary South
Independent (14)	Catherine Murphy	Kildare North
Independent (14)	Maureen O'Sullivan	Dublin Central
Independent (14)	Thomas Pringle	Donegal South-West
Independent (14)	Shane Ross	Dublin South
Independent (14)	Mick Wallace	Wexford

== Changes ==
Date	Constituency	Loss	Gain	Note
9 March 2011	Dún Laoghaire	Fine Gael	Ceann Comhairle	Seán Barrett is elected as Ceann Comhairle.
10 June 2011	Dublin West	Fianna Fáil		Death of Brian Lenihan.
7 July 2011	Roscommon–South Leitrim	Fine Gael	Independent	Denis Naughten loses the Fine Gael party whip for opposing closure of Roscommon County Hospital emergency department.
29 October 2011	Dublin West		Labour	Patrick Nulty gains the seat vacated by the death of Brian Lenihan.
15 November 2011	Longford–Westmeath	Labour	Independent	Willie Penrose resigns the Labour Party whip over the closure of an army barracks.
1 December 2011	Dublin North-East	Labour	Independent	Tommy Broughan loses the Labour Party whip after voting against the Government on a vote relating to the Bank Guarantee Scheme.
6 December 2011	Dublin West	Labour	Independent	Patrick Nulty loses the Labour Party whip after voting against the VAT increase in the 2012 budget.
31 August 2012	Dublin North	Socialist Party	Independent	Clare Daly resigns from the Socialist Party.
26 September 2012	Dublin North-West	Labour	Independent	Róisín Shortall resigns as Minister of State for Primary Care and the Labour Party whip.
13 December 2012	Galway East	Labour	Independent	Colm Keaveney loses the Labour Party whip after voting against part of the 2013 budget.
21 December 2012	Meath East	Fine Gael		Death of Shane McEntee.
27 March 2013	Meath East		Fine Gael	Helen McEntee holds the seat vacated by the death of her father Shane McEntee.
25 April 2013	Dublin South-Central	People Before Profit	Independent	Joan Collins leaves the People Before Profit Alliance and forms the United Left, while remaining an independent TD.
2 July 2013	Dublin South	Fine Gael	Independent	Peter Mathews loses the Fine Gael party whip for voting against the Protection of Life During Pregnancy Bill 2013.
2 July 2013	Wicklow	Fine Gael	Independent	Billy Timmins loses the Fine Gael party whip for voting against the Protection of Life During Pregnancy Bill 2013.
2 July 2013	Galway West	Fine Gael	Independent	Brian Walsh loses the Fine Gael party whip for voting against the Protection of Life During Pregnancy Bill 2013.
2 July 2013	Dublin North-East	Fine Gael	Independent	Terence Flanagan loses the Fine Gael party whip for voting against the Protection of Life During Pregnancy Bill 2013.
11 July 2013	Dublin South-East	Fine Gael	Independent	Lucinda Creighton loses the Fine Gael party whip for voting against the Protection of Life During Pregnancy Bill 2013.
12 July 2013	Meath West	Sinn Féin	Independent	Peadar Tóibín is suspended from the Sinn Féin parliamentary party for voting against the Protection of Life During Pregnancy Bill 2013.
7 October 2013	Longford–Westmeath	Independent	Labour	Willie Penrose rejoins the parliamentary Labour Party.
3 December 2013	Galway East	Independent	Fianna Fáil	Colm Keaveney joins Fianna Fáil.
12 January 2014	Meath West	Independent	Sinn Féin	Peadar Tóibín rejoins the Sinn Féin parliamentary party after a six month suspension for voting against the Protection of Life During Pregnancy Bill 2013.
22 March 2014	Dublin West	Independent		Resignation of Patrick Nulty.
25 March 2014	Longford–Westmeath	Fine Gael		Death of Nicky McFadden.
30 April 2014	Galway West	Independent	Fine Gael	Brian Walsh rejoins the Fine Gael parliamentary party.
23 May 2014	Dublin West		Socialist Party	Ruth Coppinger gains the seat vacated by the resignation of Patrick Nulty.
23 May 2014	Longford–Westmeath		Fine Gael	Gabrielle McFadden holds the seat vacated by the death of her sister Nicky McFadden.
26 May 2014	Roscommon–South Leitrim	Independent		Resignation of Luke 'Ming' Flanagan after election to the European Parliament.
26 May 2014	Dublin South-West	Fine Gael		Resignation of Brian Hayes after election to the European Parliament.
11 October 2014	Dublin South-West		Anti-Austerity Alliance	Paul Murphy gains the seat vacated by the resignation of Brian Hayes.
11 October 2014	Roscommon–South Leitrim		Independent	Michael Fitzmaurice gains the seat vacated by the resignation of Luke 'Ming' Flanagan.
30 October 2014	Carlow–Kilkenny	Fine Gael		Resignation of Phil Hogan on appointment to the European Commission.
10 February 2015	Wicklow	Labour	Independent	Anne Ferris loses the Labour Party whip for voting in favour of providing for abortion in cases of fatal foetal abnormalities.
13 March 2015	Dublin South-East	Independent	Renua	Lucinda Creighton joins Renua on its foundation.
13 March 2015	Wicklow	Independent	Renua	Billy Timmins joins Renua on its foundation.
13 March 2015	Dublin North-East	Independent	Renua	Terence Flanagan joins Renua on its foundation.
23 May 2015	Carlow–Kilkenny		Fianna Fáil	Bobby Aylward gains the seat vacated by the resignation of Phil Hogan.
29 May 2015	Clare	Labour	Independent	Michael McNamara loses the Labour Party whip for voting against the sale of the State's stake in Aer Lingus.
15 July 2015	Wicklow	Independent	Social Democrats	Stephen Donnelly joins the Social Democrats on its foundation.
15 July 2015	Kildare North	Independent	Social Democrats	Catherine Murphy joins the Social Democrats on its foundation.
15 July 2015	Dublin North-West	Independent	Social Democrats	Róisín Shortall joins the Social Democrats on its foundation.
16 July 2015	Wicklow	Independent	Labour	Anne Ferris rejoins the parliamentary Labour Party.
16 September 2015	Clare	Independent	Labour	Michael McNamara rejoins the parliamentary Labour Party.
26 September 2015	Dublin South-West	Labour	Independent	Eamonn Maloney resigns from the Labour Party.
24 November 2015	Cavan–Monaghan	Fine Gael	Independent	Seán Conlan resigns from Fine Gael.
14 January 2016	Galway West	Fine Gael		Resignation of Brian Walsh due to health concerns.
