= 2014 Labour Party leadership election (Ireland) =

Irish Labour Party leadership election

- 4 July 2014
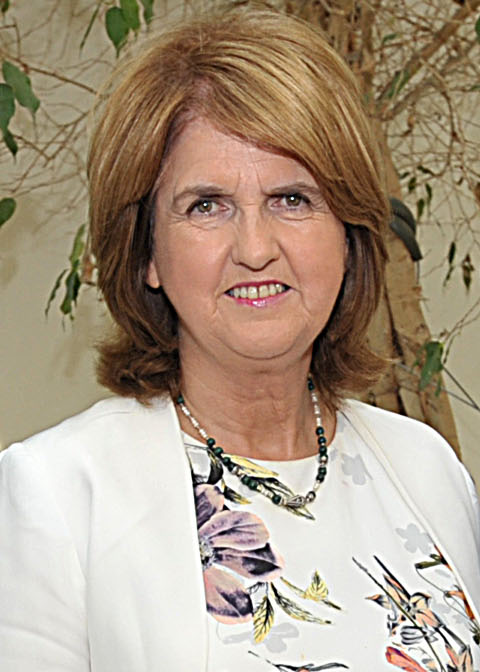

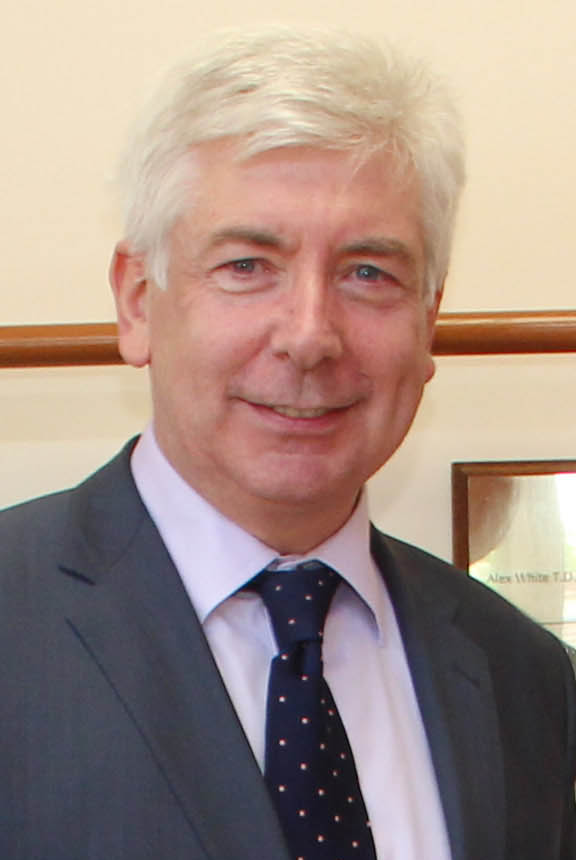
Candidate	Joan Burton	Alex White
Percentage	77%	22%
Leader before election
Eamon Gilmore
Elected Leader
Joan Burton

The 2014 Labour Party leadership election was held following the resignation of Tánaiste Eamon Gilmore as Leader of the Labour Party in the aftermath the party's poor showing at the local and European elections. A postal ballot was held to elect a successor. Nominations opened on 27 May and closed on 2 June.

== Candidates ==
Two candidates contested the leadership election:

- Joan Burton, Deputy leader and Minister for Social Protection
- Alex White, Minister of State at the Department of Health with responsibility for primary care

== Deputy leader ==
Along with the position of leader, there was also an election to fill the Deputy leadership that fell vacant on the resignation of the Leader. Four candidates contested it.

- Ciara Conway, TD for Waterford
- Alan Kelly, Minister of State at the Department of Transport, Tourism and Sport with responsibility for public and commuter transport
- Michael McCarthy, TD for Cork South-West
- Seán Sherlock, Minister of State at the Department of Education and Skills and at the Department of Jobs, Enterprise and Innovation with responsibility for research and innovation

== Debates ==
There were 5 leadership election debates held across Ireland during the election campaign.

2014 Labour Party leadership election debates
N°.	Date	Place	Leadership candidates		Deputy Leadership candidates			
P Participant. N Non-invitee. A Absent invitee.			Burton	White	Conway	Kelly	McCarthy	Sherlock
1	9 June 2014	Radisson Blu Hotel, Dublin Airport	P	P	P	P	P	P
2	16 June 2014	Clayton Hotel, Galway	P	P	P	P	P	P
3	19 June 2014	Rochestown Park Hotel, Douglas, Cork	P	P	P	P	P	P
4	21 June 2014	Tom Johnson Summer School, Portlaoise Heritage Hotel, Portlaoise	P	P	P	P	P	P
5	26 June 2014	Mansion House, Dublin	P	P	P	P	P	P

== Result ==
Joan Burton was elected as leader with 78% of the vote. Alan Kelly was elected as deputy leader.

Leadership election
Candidate	Votes	%
Joan Burton	2,094	77.0%
Alex White	607	22.3%
Spoiled	19	0.7%

Deputy leader election
Candidate	Votes	%
Alan Kelly	1,409	51.5%
Seán Sherlock	467	17.1%
Michael McCarthy	438	16.0%
Ciara Conway	421	15.4%
Spoiled	3	0.1%
