= Eamon Gilmore =

Irish former politician (born 1955)

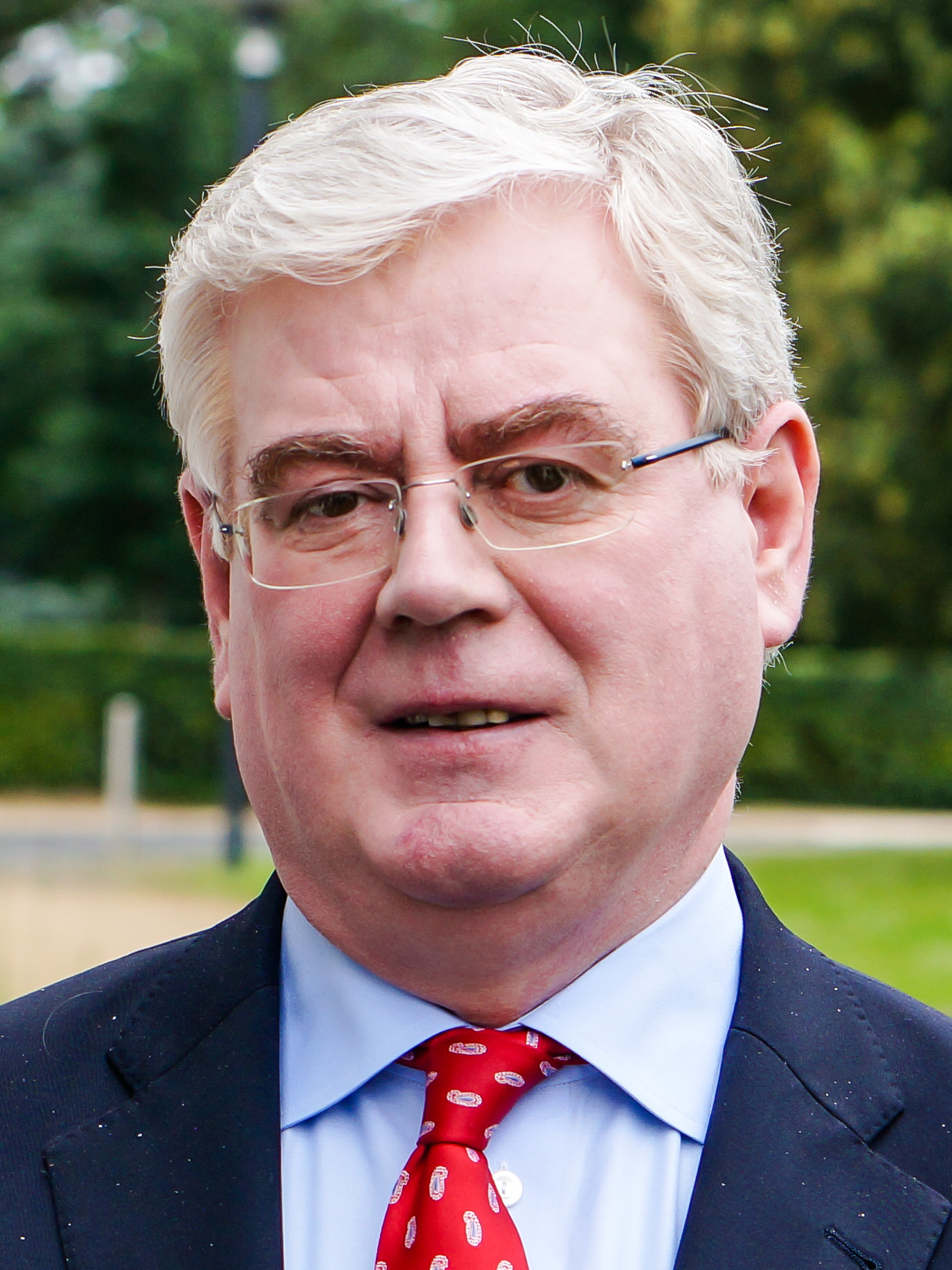
- Gilmore in 2014

European Union Special Representative for Human Rights
- In office 1 March 2019 – 29 February 2024
- President: Jean-Claude Juncker; Ursula von der Leyen
- Preceded by: Stavros Lambrinidis
- Succeeded by: Olof Skoog

European Union Special Representative for the Colombian Peace Process
- In office 1 October 2015 – 19 February 2019
- President: Jean-Claude Juncker
- Preceded by: Office established
- Succeeded by: Office abolished

Tánaiste
- In office 9 March 2011 – 4 July 2014
- Taoiseach: Enda Kenny
- Preceded by: Mary Coughlan
- Succeeded by: Joan Burton

Minister for Foreign Affairs and Trade
- In office 9 March 2011 – 11 July 2014
- Taoiseach: Enda Kenny
- Preceded by: Brian Cowen (Foreign Affairs); Mary Hanafin (Trade)
- Succeeded by: Charles Flanagan

Leader of the Labour Party
- In office 6 September 2007 – 4 July 2014
- Deputy: Joan Burton
- Preceded by: Pat Rabbitte
- Succeeded by: Joan Burton

Chair of the Organization for Security and Co-operation in Europe
- In office 1 January 2012 – 18 December 2013
- Secretary-General: Lamberto Zannier
- Preceded by: Audronius Ažubalis
- Succeeded by: Leonid Kozhara

Minister of State
- 1994–1997: Marine

Teachta Dála
- In office June 1989 – February 2016
- Constituency: Dún Laoghaire

Personal details
- Born: 24 April 1955 (age 71) Caltra, County Galway, Ireland
- Party: Labour Party (since 1999)
- Other political affiliations: Democratic Left (1992–1999); Workers' Party (1975–1992)
- Spouse: Carol Hanney (m. 1981)
- Children: 3
- Education: University College Galway
- Website: gilmore.ie

Eamon Gilmore (born 24 April 1955) is an Irish diplomat and former Labour Party politician. He has served as European Union Special Representative for Human Rights since February 2019. He has also been the European Union Special Envoy for the Colombian Peace Process since 2015. He was Tánaiste and Minister for Foreign Affairs and Trade from 2011 to 2014, Leader of the Labour Party from 2007 to 2014, Chair of the Organization for Security and Co-operation in Europe from 2012 to 2013, Minister of State at the Department of the Marine from 1994 to 1997. He was a Teachta Dála for the Dún Laoghaire constituency from 1989 to 2016.

At the 2011 general election he led the Labour Party to its best electoral performance, with a record 37 Dáil seats. Labour entered into a coalition government with Fine Gael, with Gilmore being appointed Tánaiste and Minister for Foreign Affairs and Trade.

As Minister for Foreign Affairs, he led Ireland's seventh presidency of the European Council during the first half of 2013. Throughout 2012, he held the role of Chairperson-In-Office of the Organisation for Security and Cooperation in Europe (OSCE).

Born in County Galway, Gilmore graduated from University College Galway (UCG), becoming President of Aontas na Mac Léinn in Éirinn (AMLÉ), formerly the Union of Students in Ireland (USI). Later, he entered local politics and worked as a trade union organiser. As a Democratic Left TD, he helped to negotiate that party's merger with Labour. Gilmore was elected unopposed as Labour Party leader in 2007; he resigned from the post in July 2014 and was succeeded by Joan Burton.

== Early life and career ==
Eamon Gilmore was born into a small farming family in Caltra, County Galway in 1955. When he was 14 months old his father died, leaving his mother to run the mixed farm and raise Gilmore and his younger brother John.

Gilmore received his primary education in Caltra, a small two-teacher national school. He was taught there through the medium of Irish, and he is a fluent Irish speaker to this day. Following his sixth-year state primary exam, he qualified for a scholarship from Galway County Council which enabled him to attend secondary school. He entered Garbally College, Ballinasloe, as a boarder in 1967.

Availing himself of a third-level grant to fund his degree, he went on to study psychology at UCG. He was an active member of the Drama Society at the university, where his contemporaries included the theatre director Garry Hynes and actor Marie Mullen who both went on to found the Druid Theatre Company. He also took part in the university debating scene, mainly through the Literary and Debating Society.

He was elected class representative and later, at the age of 18, was elected President of UCG Students' Union from July 1974 to June 1975. In 1975, towards the end of his term of office, he joined the UCG Republican Club which was affiliated to Official Sinn Féin; that party was subsequently renamed Sinn Féin – The Workers' Party, and later still became the Workers' Party. In recent years he has been accused of being evasive on the subject and of trying to play down that he had joined the Official Republican Movement; he has stated that the party "was in the process of becoming the Workers' Party at that time, I can't recall exactly the dates".

From 1976 until 1978, Gilmore served as President of Aontas na Mac Léinn in Éirinn (AMLÉ), formerly the Union of Students in Ireland (USI).

Before a career in politics, he worked as a trade union organiser. He joined the Irish Transport & General Workers' Union (now SIPTU) in 1978 and, after brief spells in Dublin No. 4 (Hotels & Catering) and Dublin No. 14 (Engineering) Branches, was rapidly promoted to become Acting Secretary of the Galway Branch (1978–1979), Secretary of the Tralee Branch (1979–1981), and of the Professional & Managerial Staffs Branch (1981–1989). He was heavily involved in organising tax protests in Galway and resisting redundancies and closures in County Kerry.

Gilmore has described the driving factors which have informed his working life, whether as a trade union officer or public representative. "I like advocating. I love to share in the joy people get out of cracking it, getting the job or getting some right they should have. I get huge satisfaction out of working for improvements and seeing those come through".

== Political career ==
Gilmore was elected at the 1985 election to the electoral county of Dún Laoghaire–Rathdown, serving on both Dún Laoghaire Borough Council and Dublin County Council. He was re-elected at the 1991 election; both were abolished in January 1994, with Gilmore continuing thereafter for Dún Laoghaire–Rathdown County Council.

He was first elected to Dáil Éireann at the 1989 general election as a member of the Workers' Party for the constituency of Dún Laoghaire and was re-elected at every subsequent general election until he retired at the 2016 general election.

After the collapse of the Soviet Union, he was linked with Proinsias De Rossa in attempting to jettison some of the Workers' Party's Marxist aspects and to move the party towards an acceptance of free-market economics.

In an attempt to address these issues Gilmore and De Rossa along with their supporters sought to distance themselves from paramilitary activity at a special Ardfheis held in Dún Laoghaire on 15 February 1992. A motion proposed by De Rossa and general secretary Des Geraghty sought to stand down the existing membership, elect an 11-member provisional executive council and make several other significant changes in party structures was defeated. The following day at an Ard Chomhairle meeting, six of the party's seven TDs, including De Rossa and Gimore, resigned from the Workers' Party to create a new political party, Democratic Left (originally known as New Agenda).

Throughout his political career, Gilmore has worked for peace in Northern Ireland. Along with other prominent figures including Proinsias de Rossa and Eamon Dunphy, Gilmore was among the first organisers of the Peace Train campaign which was started in 1989 in response to the repeated bombing of the Dublin to Belfast railway by the Provisional IRA. Northern Ireland was also a priority for Gilmore as Minister for Foreign Affairs and Trade during which time his efforts to reach out to the unionist community in particular were acknowledged.

In the Rainbow Coalition, between 1994 and 1997, Gilmore served as Minister of State at the Department of the Marine where he is credited for overseeing major reform in port ownership, investment in port development, banning nuclear vessels from Irish seas and restricting dumping at sea.

With Labour's Brendan Howlin, Gilmore was a central figure in the negotiations that led to the merger of Democratic Left with the Labour Party in 1999 under the Leadership of Ruairi Quinn. From 1999 to 2007, he sat on the Labour Party front bench as Environment, Housing and Local Government Spokesperson.

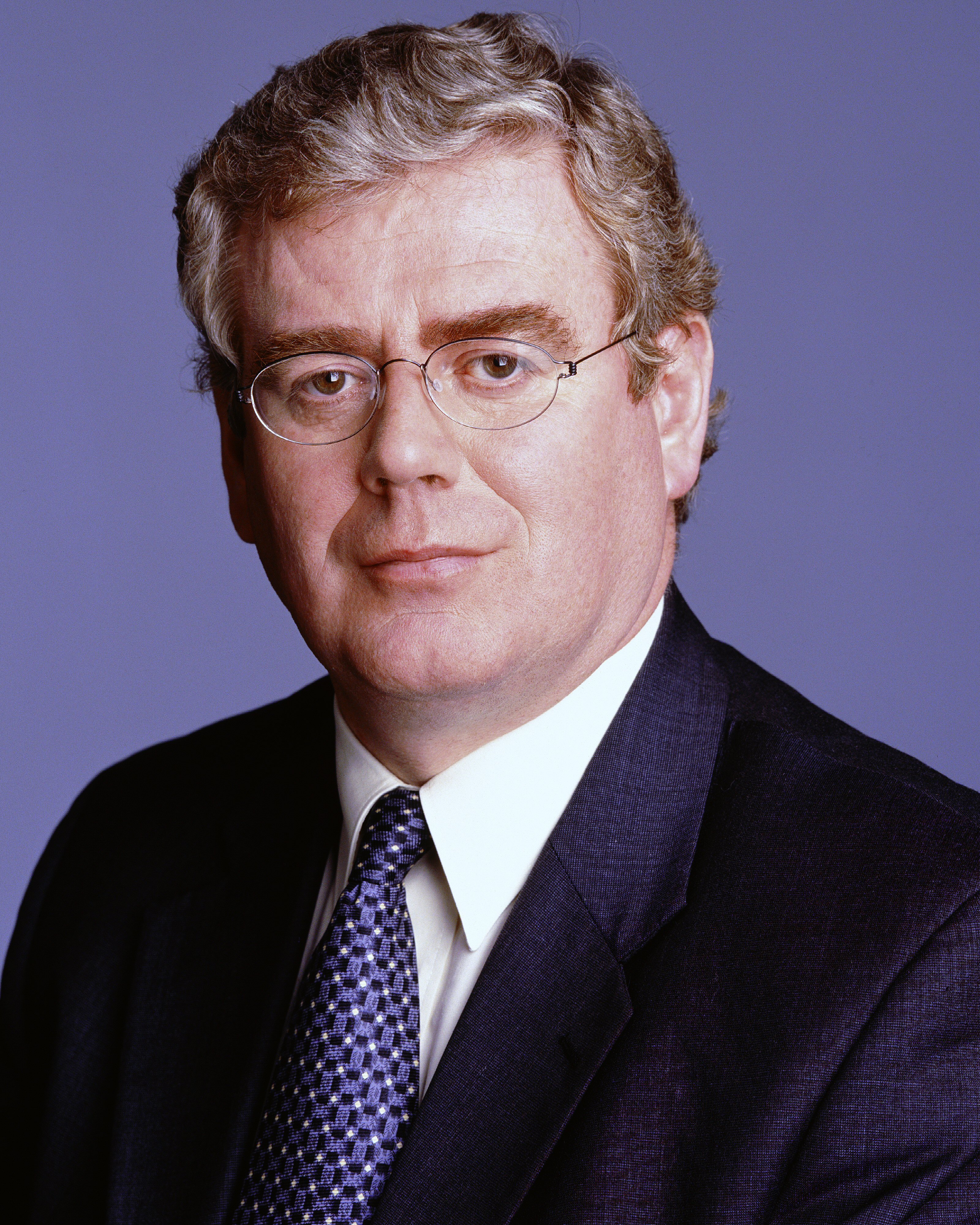
Gilmore in 2002

After Quinn's resignation in 2002, Gilmore unsuccessfully contested the Leadership won by former student union and political colleague Pat Rabbitte.

Around this time, Gilmore voiced his support for the Campaign for the Establishment of a United Nations Parliamentary Assembly, an organisation which campaigns for the democratic reformation of the United Nations, and the creation of a more accountable international political system.

=== Labour Party leader ===
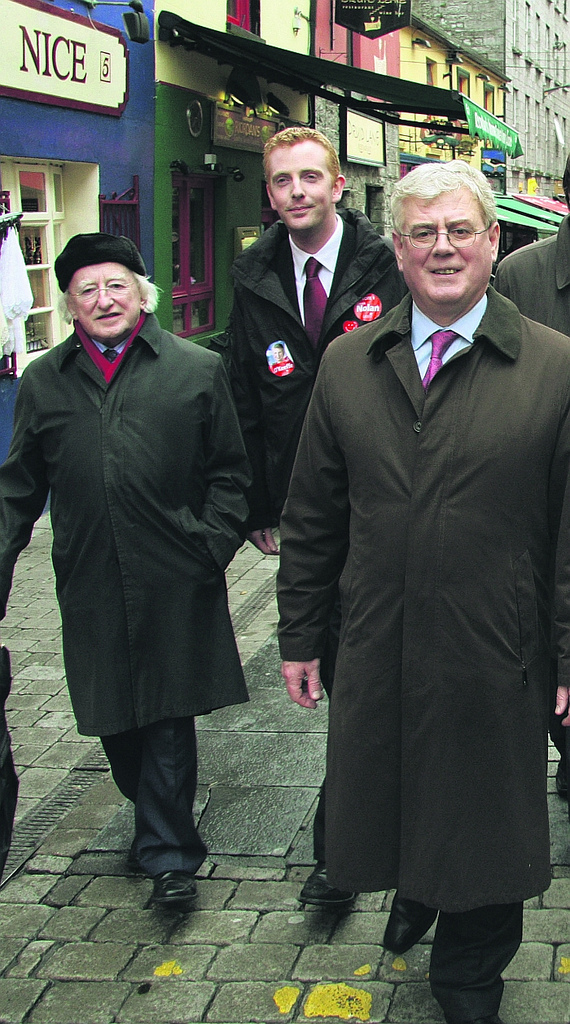
Gilmore, Derek Nolan and Michael D. Higgins campaigning in Galway in 2008.

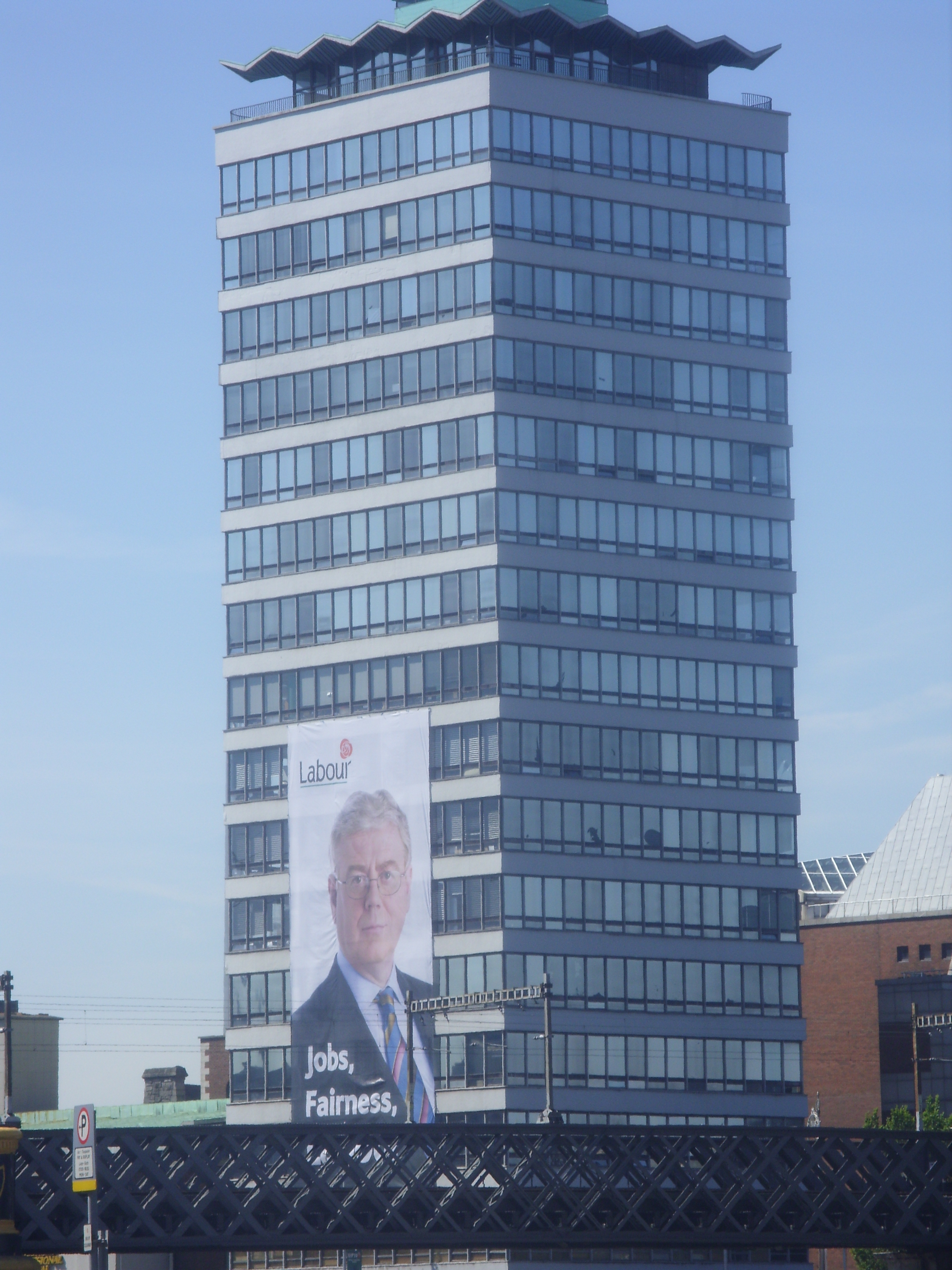
Banner of Gilmore on Liberty Hall, 2009

Following Pat Rabbitte's resignation as party leader in August 2007, Gilmore announced his candidacy for the leadership. He received support from senior figures such as Michael D. Higgins, Ruairi Quinn, Willie Penrose, Liz McManus and Emmet Stagg, and did not have to contest a ballot, being formally confirmed as leader on 6 September, after being the only declared candidate. He became the tenth leader of the Labour Party.

From early on in his Leadership Gilmore insisted that Labour should aspire to lead the next Government and set about building Labour as a third option for voters. At the 2009 local elections, the Labour Party added to its total of council seats, with 132 seats won (a gain of 43) and by July 2010 had gained an additional six seats from councillors joining the party since the election. On Dublin City Council, the party was again the largest, but now with more seats than the two other main parties combined.

At the 2009 European Parliament election held on the same day, the Labour Party increased its number of seats from 1 to 3, retaining the seat of Proinsias De Rossa in the Dublin constituency, while gaining seats in the East constituency with Nessa Childers, and in the South constituency with Alan Kelly.

Gilmore campaigned for a Yes vote in the first Lisbon Treaty referendum in 2008. When it was defeated, he declared that the "Lisbon Treaty is dead". According to a wikileaks cable dated 23 July 2008 and released in 2011, he told the US Ambassador privately that he would support a second referendum. The ambassador reported that: "He explained his public posture of opposition to a second referendum as 'politically necessary' for the time being". In 2009, after a second referendum had approved it, the Lisbon Treaty proposal was passed by the Twenty-eighth Amendment of the Constitution of Ireland.

In September 2009, at the Labour Parliamentary Party Meeting in Waterford, Gilmore categorically ruled out a coalition with Fianna Fáil after the next general election, reiterating what he had said in earlier interviews.

In his leader's address to the 2010 Labour Party Conference (17 April 2010), Gilmore outlined his vision that the Labour Party should lead the way in building 'One Ireland'. In this speech, he listed the Labour Party's policy priorities as Jobs, Reform and Fairness. He also said he was determined that the Labour Party would run enough candidates at the next general election to enable the Irish people to make Labour the largest party in the Dáil and to lead the next government.

In July 2010, Gilmore again ruled out a coalition between his party and Fianna Fáil after a general election, even if such a coalition would put him in a position to become Taoiseach. Gilmore also said his party was well-positioned to win at least one seat in each of the country's 43 constituencies, and two seats in some constituencies in Dublin, Cork, other urban areas and commuter-belt counties. In all, he said the party had the potential to win 50 seats or more.

Gilmore also played a leading role in the modernisation and liberalisation of Ireland's social legislation, most notably on divorce and abortion, and has been to the fore in the campaign for gay marriage. He is often quoted for citing gay marriage as "the civil rights issue of this generation". Gilmore also committed to holding a constitutional referendum on the issue a key plank of the Labour/Fine Gael programme for government. A referendum on gay marriage was held in 2015. He was a member of the cabinet committee that steered through Ireland's divorce legislation in 1996, as well as a member of the Divorce Action Group which campaigned for the legalisation of divorce in Ireland. In 1983, Gilmore campaigned against the ban on abortion in the Constitution.

As Minister for Foreign Affairs and Trade, Gilmore was behind the most significant expansion of Ireland's embassy network for several decades, opening eight new diplomatic missions across Europe, Asia, Africa and the Americas in 2014. Despite considerable media focus on the reopening of the embassy to the Vatican, which had been closed for economic reasons in 2011 along with the embassy to Tehran, the new missions are largely trade and investment-focussed.

In 2013, Gilmore launched the first review of Irish foreign policy since 1996.

Gilmore was a member of the Economic Management Council (EMC) from 2011 to 2014, along with Taoiseach Enda Kenny, Minister for Finance, Michael Noonan, and Minister for Public Expenditure and Reform, Brendan Howlin. For the first three years of the Fine Gael/Labour government, the EMC was regarded as the lynchpin of the coalition's stability.

In May 2014, after a poor showing for Labour at the local and European elections, Gilmore resigned as leader. Following a leadership election in July 2014, he was succeeded as party leader and as Tánaiste by Joan Burton.

=== 2011 general election ===
Gilmore led Labour to the best electoral performance in the party's 99-year history at the 2011 general election. The party won 37 seats. It did especially well in Dublin, taking 18 seats to become the largest party in the capital. Gilmore topped the poll in the Dún Laoghaire constituency.

=== Tánaiste and government minister (2011–2014) ===
Following the election, Labour entered a coalition with Fine Gael. Gilmore became Tánaiste and Minister for Foreign Affairs and Trade. He named five ministers to cabinet, six Ministers of State, and Máire Whelan as Attorney General. He also recreated the office of the Tánaiste within the Department of the Taoiseach to enhance his control over Government policy. This office was originally created under Tánaiste Dick Spring in 1992, but was abolished by his successor Mary Harney.

=== Troika bailout exit ===
On 15 December 2013, Ireland became the first eurozone country to exit a €67.5 billion EC/ECB/IMF bailout programme following a multi-year programme. The troika bailout was triggered in November 2010 following the collapse of the Irish property market which in turn had pushed the country's banks into financial crisis.

A blanket guarantee on all of the liabilities of the Irish banks — established by the previous Fianna Fáil/Green Party coalition in September 2008 — dragged the State to near bankruptcy and forced the government to turn to the EU/IMF as lenders of last resort.

In November 2014, the Government announced that it would exit the EU/IMF bailout programme without seeking a precautionary credit line, often referred to as a 'clean bailout exit'. In an interview with RTÉ's Morning Ireland radio programme on 15 November, Gilmore explained that the Government had conducted a long process of consultation with international institutions and other EU member states before deciding to exit the bailout cleanly. He also pointed to the existence of a €20 billion "backstop" of reserve funding held by the National Treasury Management Agency that could fund the Irish State up until the beginning of 2015 if so required.

=== Northern Ireland ===
On 11 November 2012, Gilmore became the first Irish Government Minister to take part in the annual Remembrance Sunday ceremony in Belfast when he laid a laurel wreath at the Cenotaph at Belfast City Hall to honour those who had died in the First and Second World Wars. He attended the ceremony again the following year.

In September 2013, the Irish Times reported that he had "br[oken] new political ground" when in a speech to the British Irish Association in Cambridge, "he went out of his way to address a unionist perception of a failure by a number of Irish governments to properly combat the IRA". In the same speech, he also said he hoped that the Government of Ireland could "host representatives of the royal family and the British government, along with the leaders of unionism, in Dublin in three years' time in remembering the Easter Rising". He was part of the process which aimed at resolving issues relating to parading, flags and emblems, and the past that was chaired by US diplomat Richard Haass from September to December 2013, and he maintained contact with the parties involved until he was replaced as foreign affairs minister in a cabinet reshuffle the following year.

=== OSCE chair ===
On 1 January 2012, Ireland assumed the 2012 chair of the Organization for Security and Co-operation in Europe (OCSE) for the first time. In his role as Minister for Foreign Affairs and Trade, Gilmore served as the Chairman-in-Office of the OSCE.

=== EU Presidency and budget negotiations ===
As Minister for Foreign Affairs and Trade, Gilmore led Ireland's seventh Presidency of the Council of the European Union during the first half of 2013. He chaired the General Affairs Council of the European Union (EU) and acted as lead negotiator for the Council in talks with the European Parliament on a €960 billion, seven-year budget deal – also known as a Multi-Annual Financial Framework (MFF) – for the EU for the period 2014–2020.

=== Ireland's diplomatic network ===
In November 2011, Gilmore announced the closure of Ireland's embassies in Iran and the Vatican, and a representative office in East Timor, on economic grounds. Ireland was to retain an ambassador to the Holy See who would reside in Ireland rather than Rome. In January 2014, he announced that eight new diplomatic missions would be opened around the world, focusing mainly on trade and investment.

=== Undocumented Irish citizens in the US ===
As Minister for Foreign Affairs and Trade, Gilmore lobbied for comprehensive legislation overhauling US immigration laws to help an estimated 11 million illegal immigrants, over 50,000 of whom are believed to be Irish. On 17 June 2014, Gilmore travelled to Washington D.C. for two days of meetings, most of which focused on Republican members of the House of Representatives.

=== Croke Park agreement ===
In December, Gilmore once again put his support behind the Croke Park Deal on public sector pay and conditions. The dismissal of a renegotiation of the deal came in light of comments from Minister for Communications, Energy and Natural Resources Pat Rabbitte that the deal could be renegotiated along with calls from junior Fine Gael TDs that the agreement should be scrapped.

== Retirement from Irish politics and afterwards ==
On 2 June 2015, Gilmore announced that he would not contest the 2016 general election.

In February 2016, he was appointed as an adjunct professor in the School of Law and Government at Dublin City University.

In 2017, he was a Visiting Practitioner Professor at the School of Public Policy at the Central European University, Budapest. He has also lectured at universities, think tanks and public policy conferences throughout Europe, the UK, the US, Latin America and Africa.

He is also a Member of the External Advisory Board of the National University of Ireland, Galway and is a member of the International Advisory Board of the Alpbach Forum in Austria.

=== European Union Special Representative ===
On 1 October 2015, Gilmore was appointed by High Representative of the European Union for Foreign Affairs and Security Policy Federica Mogherini as European Union Special Envoy for the Colombian Peace Process.

On 19 February 2019, the High Representative of the European Union for Foreign Affairs and Security Policy Federica Mogherini nominated Eamon Gilmore to be European Union Special Representative for Human Rights. His nomination was approved by the Foreign Affairs Council on 20 February 2019. His mandate ended on 29 February 2024.

== Awards and honours ==
In 2015, Gilmore was named by the Washington-based Foreign Policy as one of the 100 leading Global Thinkers for his role in Ireland's marriage equality referendum, which approved same-sex marriage.

In 2016, he was conferred with an Honorary Doctorate in law by his alma mater, the National University of Ireland, Galway.

The Government of France has made him an Official of the Legion of Honour.

Colombia has honoured him with the Order of San Carlos (Gran Cruz) for his work on the Peace Process.

== Personal life ==
Gilmore met his wife Carol at university. They have lived in Shankill, Dublin since 1979, and have two sons and one daughter. His brother, John, is a television producer in Washington D.C.

He described his religious beliefs during an interview, saying, "I'm agnostic. I doubt rather than I believe, let me put it that way". He also said "I'm pro-choice" when asked during the same interview if abortion should be legalised.

He published a book in November 2010 entitled Leading Lights: People Who've Inspired Me and an account of his time as Labour leader during the financial crash and recovery, Inside the Room: The Untold Story of Ireland's Crisis Government in 2016.

Political offices
Preceded by Mary Coughlan	Tánaiste; 2011–2014	Succeeded by Joan Burton
Preceded by Brian Cowen as Minister for Foreign Affairs	Minister for Foreign Affairs and Trade; 2011–2014	Succeeded by Charles Flanagan
Preceded by Mary Hanafin as Minister for Enterprise, Trade and Innovation	Minister for Foreign Affairs and Trade; 2011–2014	Succeeded by Charles Flanagan
Party political offices
Preceded by Pat Rabbitte	Leader of the Labour Party; 2007–2014	Succeeded by Joan Burton

Dáil	Election	Deputy (Party)	Deputy (Party)	Deputy (Party)	Deputy (Party)	Deputy (Party)
21st	1977	David Andrews (FF)	Liam Cosgrave (FG)	Barry Desmond (Lab)	Martin O'Donoghue (FF)	4 seats 1977–1981
22nd	1981	David Andrews (FF)	Liam T. Cosgrave (FG)	Barry Desmond (Lab)	Martin O'Donoghue (FF)	Seán Barrett (FG)
23rd	1982 (Feb)	David Andrews (FF)	Liam T. Cosgrave (FG)	Barry Desmond (Lab)	Martin O'Donoghue (FF)	Seán Barrett (FG)
24th	1982 (Nov)	David Andrews (FF)	Liam T. Cosgrave (FG)	Barry Desmond (Lab)	Monica Barnes (FG)	Seán Barrett (FG)
25th	1987	David Andrews (FF)	Geraldine Kennedy (PDs)	Barry Desmond (Lab)	Monica Barnes (FG)	Seán Barrett (FG)
26th	1989	David Andrews (FF)	Brian Hillery (FF)	Eamon Gilmore (WP)	Monica Barnes (FG)	Seán Barrett (FG)
27th	1992	David Andrews (FF)	Helen Keogh (PDs)	Eamon Gilmore (DL)	Niamh Bhreathnach (Lab)	Seán Barrett (FG)
28th	1997	David Andrews (FF)	Monica Barnes (FG)	Eamon Gilmore (Lab)	Mary Hanafin (FF)	Seán Barrett (FG)
29th	2002	Barry Andrews (FF)	Fiona O'Malley (PDs)	Eamon Gilmore (Lab)	Mary Hanafin (FF)	Ciarán Cuffe (GP)
30th	2007	Barry Andrews (FF)	Seán Barrett (Note: Served as Ceann Comhairle in the 31st Dáil from 2011 to 2016 and was returned automatically at the 2016 general election.) (FG)	Eamon Gilmore (Lab)	Mary Hanafin (FF)	Ciarán Cuffe (GP)
31st	2011	Mary Mitchell O'Connor (FG)	Seán Barrett (FG)	Eamon Gilmore (Lab)	Richard Boyd Barrett (PBP)	4 seats from 2011
32nd	2016	Mary Mitchell O'Connor (FG)	Seán Barrett (FG)	Maria Bailey (FG)	Richard Boyd Barrett (AAA–PBP)	4 seats from 2011
33rd	2020	Jennifer Carroll MacNeill (FG)	Ossian Smyth (GP)	Cormac Devlin (FF)	Richard Boyd Barrett (S–PBP)	4 seats from 2011
34th	2024	Jennifer Carroll MacNeill (FG)	Barry Ward (FG)	Cormac Devlin (FF)	Richard Boyd Barrett (PBP–S)	4 seats from 2011
