= Róisín Shortall =

Irish former politician (born 1954)

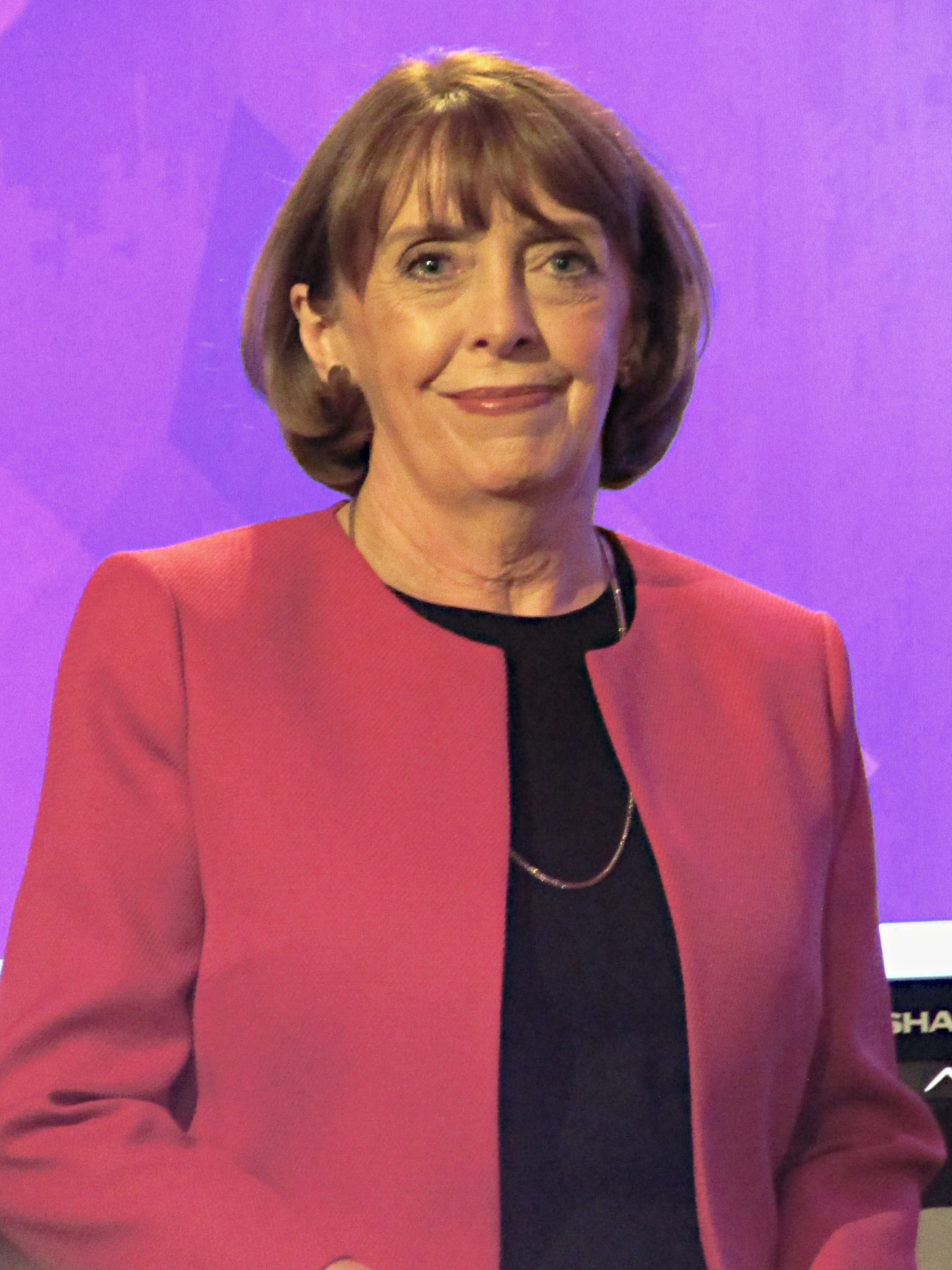
- Shortall in 2022

Leader of the Social Democrats
- In office 15 July 2015 – 1 March 2023 Serving with Catherine Murphy
- Preceded by: Party established
- Succeeded by: Holly Cairns

Minister of State
- 2011–2012: Health

Teachta Dála
- In office November 1992 – November 2024
- Constituency: Dublin North-West

Personal details
- Born: 25 April 1954 (age 72) Drumcondra, Dublin, Ireland
- Party: Social Democrats (2015–present)
- Other political affiliations: Labour Party (1988–2012); Independent (2012–2015)
- Spouse: Seamus O'Byrne (m. 1989)
- Children: 3
- Education: University College Dublin; Marino Institute of Education, Dublin
- Website: roisinshortall.ie

Róisín Shortall (born 25 April 1954) is an Irish former Social Democrats politician who served as a Teachta Dála (TD) for the Dublin North-West constituency from 1992 to 2024. She was previously founding joint leader of the Social Democrats from 2015 to 2023 and served as Minister of State for Primary Care from 2011 to 2012.

A member of the Labour Party until 2012, she sat as an Independent from 2012 to 2015, until she co-founded the Social Democrats in July 2015.

In August 2022, she became the longest serving female TD in the history of the State, overtaking Mary Harney.

== Early life ==
Shortall was born and raised in Drumcondra, Dublin. Her father was a Fianna Fáil Dublin City Councillor who had fought in the Irish Civil War. She was educated at Dominican College, Eccles Street; University College Dublin, and Marino Institute of Education, Marino. She has a B.A. in Economics and Politics. She worked as a teacher for the deaf before seeking public office.

== Political career ==
In 1988, she joined the Labour Party and was first elected at the 1991 Dublin Corporation election for the local electoral area of Drumcondra.

Shortall was first elected to Dáil Éireann at the 1992 general election, when the Labour Party won a record 33 seats as part of the "Spring Tide", a surge credited to the popularity of Labour leader Dick Spring. She retained her seat at each of the following four general elections. She is a former party spokesperson for Social and Family Affairs.

In 1999, she opposed the merger of the Democratic Left into the Labour Party. Following a poor showing by Labour in the 2002 general election, she was openly critical of the leadership of Ruairi Quinn. Following Quinn's resignation from the leadership months later, she contested the leadership position and came fourth, behind Eamon Gilmore.

On 10 March 2011, she was appointed as Minister of State at the Department of Health with special responsibility for primary care. On 3 September 2012, Fianna Fáil and Sinn Féin tabled a motion of no confidence in Minister for Health James Reilly, after yet more cuts in the health service. Shortall addressed the Dáil during this motion and did not indicate her support for him or mention his name once, though she did vote against the motion. She resigned as Minister of State on 26 September 2012, and also resigned the Parliamentary Labour Party whip.

=== Social Democrats ===
On 15 July 2015, Shortall launched the Social Democrats along with fellow Independent TDs Stephen Donnelly and Catherine Murphy, each of whom were co-leaders of the party. She was elected for that party at the 2016 general election and 2020 general election.

In February 2022, Shortall, as spokesperson for Health, introduced a bill in the Dáil to stop the practice of the HSE sending debt collectors to cancer patients in search of payment. The bill also sought an end to an inpatient charge of €80 per visit for chemo and radiotherapy, and also sought to end extortionate parking fees. The government did not oppose the bill. Shortall opined that it was "frankly disgusting" that cancer patients were being pursued by debt collectors during one of the most difficult points in their lives. Each of the other opposition parties all praised the content of the bill and similarly expressed their dismay at the idea of debt collectors being used on cancer patients.

On 22 February 2023, Shortall and Murphy announced that they would step down as co-leaders of the Social Democrats. They were succeeded by Holly Cairns on 1 March. On 2 July 2024, she and Murphy both announced that they would not contest the next general election.

== Election results ==
Elections to the Dáil
Party	Election		FPv	FPv%	Result
Labour	Dublin North-West	1992	8,634	23.1	Elected on count 1/12
Labour	Dublin North-West	1997	4,084	11.1	Elected on count 10/10
Labour	Dublin North-West	2002	4,391	16.8	Elected on count 6/6
Labour	Dublin North-West	2007	6,286	20.3	Elected on count 3/3
Labour	Dublin North-West	2011	9,359	28.5	Elected on count 1/7
Social Democrats	Dublin North-West	2016	10,540	28.5	Elected on count 1/9
Social Democrats	Dublin North-West	2020	6,124	18.9	Elected on count 4/6

Political offices
New office	Minister of State for Primary Care; 2011–2012	Succeeded by Alex White

Dáil	Election	Deputy (Party)	Deputy (Party)	Deputy (Party)	Deputy (Party)
2nd	1921	Philip Cosgrave (SF)	Joseph McGrath (SF)	Richard Mulcahy (SF)	Michael Staines (SF)
3rd	1922	Philip Cosgrave (PT-SF)	Joseph McGrath (PT-SF)	Richard Mulcahy (PT-SF)	Michael Staines (PT-SF)
4th	1923	Constituency abolished. See Dublin North			

Dáil	Election	Deputy (Party)	Deputy (Party)	Deputy (Party)	Deputy (Party)	Deputy (Party)
9th	1937	Seán T. O'Kelly (FF)	A. P. Byrne (Ind.)	Cormac Breathnach (FF)	Patrick McGilligan (FG)	Archie Heron (Lab)
10th	1938	Seán T. O'Kelly (FF)	A. P. Byrne (Ind.)	Cormac Breathnach (FF)	Patrick McGilligan (FG)	Eamonn Cooney (FF)
11th	1943	Seán T. O'Kelly (FF)	A. P. Byrne (Ind.)	Cormac Breathnach (FF)	Patrick McGilligan (FG)	Martin O'Sullivan (Lab)
12th	1944	Seán T. O'Kelly (FF)	John S. O'Connor (FF)	Cormac Breathnach (FF)	Patrick McGilligan (FG)	Martin O'Sullivan (Lab)
12th	1945 by-election	Vivion de Valera (FF)	John S. O'Connor (FF)	Cormac Breathnach (FF)	Patrick McGilligan (FG)	Martin O'Sullivan (Lab)
13th	1948	Mick Fitzpatrick (CnaP)	A. P. Byrne (Ind.)	Cormac Breathnach (FF)	3 seats from 1948 to 1969	
14th	1951	Declan Costello (FG)	A. P. Byrne (Ind.)	Cormac Breathnach (FF)	3 seats from 1948 to 1969	
14th	1952 by-election	Declan Costello (FG)	Thomas Byrne (Ind.)	Cormac Breathnach (FF)	3 seats from 1948 to 1969	
15th	1954	Declan Costello (FG)	Thomas Byrne (Ind.)	Richard Gogan (FF)	3 seats from 1948 to 1969	
16th	1957	Declan Costello (FG)	Thomas Byrne (Ind.)	Richard Gogan (FF)	3 seats from 1948 to 1969	
17th	1961	Declan Costello (FG)	Michael Mullen (Lab)	Richard Gogan (FF)	3 seats from 1948 to 1969	
18th	1965	Declan Costello (FG)	Michael Mullen (Lab)	Richard Gogan (FF)	3 seats from 1948 to 1969	
19th	1969	Hugh Byrne (FG)	Jim Tunney (FF)	Richard Gogan (FF)	David Thornley (Lab)	4 seats from 1969 to 1977
20th	1973	Hugh Byrne (FG)	Jim Tunney (FF)	Richard Gogan (FF)	David Thornley (Lab)	4 seats from 1969 to 1977
21st	1977	Constituency abolished. See Dublin Finglas and Dublin Cabra				

Dáil	Election	Deputy (Party)	Deputy (Party)	Deputy (Party)	Deputy (Party)
22nd	1981	Jim Tunney (FF)	Michael Barrett (FF)	Mary Flaherty (FG)	Hugh Byrne (FG)
23rd	1982 (Feb)	Jim Tunney (FF)	Michael Barrett (FF)	Mary Flaherty (FG)	Proinsias De Rossa (WP)
24th	1982 (Nov)	Jim Tunney (FF)	Michael Barrett (FF)	Mary Flaherty (FG)	Proinsias De Rossa (WP)
25th	1987	Jim Tunney (FF)	Michael Barrett (FF)	Mary Flaherty (FG)	Proinsias De Rossa (WP)
26th	1989	Jim Tunney (FF)	Michael Barrett (FF)	Mary Flaherty (FG)	Proinsias De Rossa (WP)
27th	1992	Noel Ahern (FF)	Róisín Shortall (Lab)	Mary Flaherty (FG)	Proinsias De Rossa (DL)
28th	1997	Noel Ahern (FF)	Róisín Shortall (Lab)	Pat Carey (FF)	Proinsias De Rossa (DL)
29th	2002	Noel Ahern (FF)	Róisín Shortall (Lab)	Pat Carey (FF)	3 seats from 2002
30th	2007	Noel Ahern (FF)	Róisín Shortall (Lab)	Pat Carey (FF)	3 seats from 2002
31st	2011	Dessie Ellis (SF)	Róisín Shortall (Lab)	John Lyons (Lab)	3 seats from 2002
32nd	2016	Dessie Ellis (SF)	Róisín Shortall (SD)	Noel Rock (FG)	3 seats from 2002
33rd	2020	Dessie Ellis (SF)	Róisín Shortall (SD)	Paul McAuliffe (FF)	3 seats from 2002
34th	2024	Dessie Ellis (SF)	Rory Hearne (SD)	Paul McAuliffe (FF)	3 seats from 2002
