= Willie Penrose =

Irish former politician (born 1956)

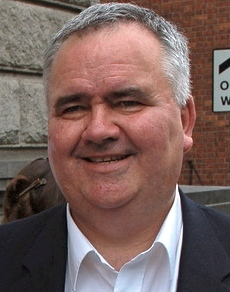
- Penrose in 2005

Chairman of the Labour Parliamentary Party
- In office 29 February 2016 – 26 February 2020
- Leader: Joan Burton; Brendan Howlin
- Preceded by: Jack Wall
- Succeeded by: Vacant

Minister of State
- 2011: Environment, Community and Local Government

Teachta Dála
- In office May 2007 – February 2020
- Constituency: Longford–Westmeath
- In office November 1992 – May 2007
- Constituency: Westmeath

Personal details
- Born: William Penrose; 1 August 1956 (age 70) Ballynacargy, County Westmeath, Ireland
- Party: Labour (1969–2011; since 2013)
- Other political affiliations: Independent (2011–2013)
- Spouse: Anne Fitzsimons
- Children: 3
- Education: University College Dublin; King's Inns

Willie Penrose (born 1 August 1956) is an Irish former Labour Party politician who served as Chairman of the Labour Parliamentary Party from 2016 to 2020 and a Minister of State from March 2011 to November 2011. He served as a Teachta Dála (TD) from 1992 to 2020.

== Education and professional career ==
Penrose was born in Ballynacargy, County Westmeath, in 1956. He was educated at Coláiste Mhuire, Mullingar, Multyfarnham Agricultural College, University College Dublin (UCD), and the King's Inns. At UCD, he studied Agricultural Science, graduating in 1979 with a bachelor's degree; after graduation, with a colleague, he formed an agricultural consultancy firm in Mullingar. In 1986 he took up the position of advisor to the Minister of State at the Department of Fisheries, Forestry and Tourism, Michael Moynihan, resigning from the agricultural consultancy to do so.

He qualified as a barrister in 1990, before entering into national politics. He has published a book on agricultural law.

== Political career ==
=== Westmeath County Council ===
In 1984, Penrose was co-opted on to Westmeath County Council, and a year later, he ran in the local elections, winning his seat in the Mullingar Lough Owel local electoral area by a margin of just six votes. In the 1991 local elections, he topped the poll in the Mullingar Rural Area.

=== Dáil Éireann: 1992–2020 ===
At the 1992 general election, in which the Labour Party won a record 33 seats (later surpassed in 2011), he was first elected to the Dáil as a Labour Party TD for the Westmeath constituency.

In 2002, Penrose was a candidate for the deputy leadership of the Labour Party. Although he was part of a joint ticket with Pat Rabbitte, who won the leadership comfortably, he was narrowly defeated for the deputy leadership by Liz McManus, polling 1,636 votes to McManus's 1,728.

==== Minister of State: 2011 ====
On 9 March 2011, he was appointed as Minister of State at the Department of Environment, Community and Local Government with special responsibility for Housing and Planning, attending meetings of the cabinet.

On 15 November 2011, he resigned as Minister of State due to his opposition to the government's decision to close Columb Barracks in Mullingar. Penrose said: "I understand and appreciate that significant efforts were made by my Labour colleagues in government, who fully understood the depths of my feelings in this regard, to resolve this matter, but to no avail." He also resigned the Labour parliamentary party whip.

==== 2012–2020 ====
In February 2012, The Phoenix magazine contrasted Penrose who "eats at the PLP tables in the Dáil restaurant and is often seen chatting to Gilmore on the corridors" with two other backbenchers who lost the party whip, Tommy Broughan and Patrick Nulty, both of whom had been "banished" from the Labour parliamentary offices. Penrose rejoined the parliamentary Labour Party in October 2013.

He was narrowly re-elected to the Dáil at the 2016 general election, one of just seven Labour TDs to secure election. On 5 July 2018, he announced that he would not contest the next general election. Alan Mangan was selected as his replacement for the 2020 general election, but Mangan was not elected.

Dáil	Election	Deputy (Party)	Deputy (Party)	Deputy (Party)
27th	1992	Willie Penrose (Lab)	Mary O'Rourke (FF)	Paul McGrath (FG)
28th	1997	Willie Penrose (Lab)	Mary O'Rourke (FF)	Paul McGrath (FG)
29th	2002	Willie Penrose (Lab)	Donie Cassidy (FF)	Paul McGrath (FG)
30th	2007	Constituency abolished. See Longford–Westmeath		

Dáil	Election	Deputy (Party)	Deputy (Party)	Deputy (Party)	Deputy (Party)	Deputy (Party)
2nd	1921	Lorcan Robbins (SF)	Seán Mac Eoin (SF)	Joseph McGuinness (SF)	Laurence Ginnell (SF)	4 seats 1921–1923
3rd	1922	John Lyons (Lab)	Seán Mac Eoin (PT-SF)	Francis McGuinness (PT-SF)	Laurence Ginnell (AT-SF)	4 seats 1921–1923
4th	1923	John Lyons (Ind.)	Conor Byrne (Rep)	James Killane (Rep)	Patrick Shaw (CnaG)	Patrick McKenna (FP)
5th	1927 (Jun)	Henry Broderick (Lab)	Michael Kennedy (FF)	James Victory (FF)	Patrick Shaw (CnaG)	Hugh Garahan (FP)
6th	1927 (Sep)	Henry Broderick (Lab)	Michael Kennedy (FF)	James Killane (FF)	Patrick Shaw (CnaG)	Michael Connolly (CnaG)
6th	1930 by-election	Henry Broderick (Lab)	Michael Kennedy (FF)	James Geoghegan (FF)	Patrick Shaw (CnaG)	Michael Connolly (CnaG)
7th	1932	Francis Gormley (FF)	Michael Kennedy (FF)	James Geoghegan (FF)	Patrick Shaw (CnaG)	Seán Mac Eoin (CnaG)
8th	1933	James Victory (FF)	Michael Kennedy (FF)	James Geoghegan (FF)	Charles Fagan (NCP)	Seán Mac Eoin (CnaG)
9th	1937	Constituency abolished. See Athlone–Longford and Meath–Westmeath				

Dáil	Election	Deputy (Party)	Deputy (Party)	Deputy (Party)	Deputy (Party)	Deputy (Party)
13th	1948	Erskine H. Childers (FF)	Thomas Carter (FF)	Michael Kennedy (FF)	Seán Mac Eoin (FG)	Charles Fagan (Ind.)
14th	1951	Erskine H. Childers (FF)	Frank Carter (FF)	Michael Kennedy (FF)	Seán Mac Eoin (FG)	Charles Fagan (Ind.)
15th	1954	Erskine H. Childers (FF)	Frank Carter (FF)	Michael Kennedy (FF)	Seán Mac Eoin (FG)	Charles Fagan (FG)
16th	1957	Erskine H. Childers (FF)	Ruairí Ó Brádaigh (SF)	Michael Kennedy (FF)	Seán Mac Eoin (FG)	Charles Fagan (FG)
17th	1961	Frank Carter (FF)	Joe Sheridan (Ind.)	Michael Kennedy (FF)	Seán Mac Eoin (FG)	4 seats 1961–1992
18th	1965	Frank Carter (FF)	Joe Sheridan (Ind.)	Patrick Lenihan (FF)	Gerry L'Estrange (FG)	4 seats 1961–1992
19th	1969	Frank Carter (FF)	Joe Sheridan (Ind.)	Patrick Lenihan (FF)	Gerry L'Estrange (FG)	4 seats 1961–1992
19th	1970 by-election	Frank Carter (FF)	Joe Sheridan (Ind.)	Patrick Cooney (FG)	Gerry L'Estrange (FG)	4 seats 1961–1992
20th	1973	Frank Carter (FF)	Joe Sheridan (Ind.)	Patrick Cooney (FG)	Gerry L'Estrange (FG)	4 seats 1961–1992
21st	1977	Albert Reynolds (FF)	Joe Sheridan (Ind.)	Seán Keegan (FF)	Gerry L'Estrange (FG)	4 seats 1961–1992
22nd	1981	Albert Reynolds (FF)	Patrick Cooney (FG)	Seán Keegan (FF)	Gerry L'Estrange (FG)	4 seats 1961–1992
23rd	1982 (Feb)	Albert Reynolds (FF)	Patrick Cooney (FG)	Seán Keegan (FF)	Gerry L'Estrange (FG)	4 seats 1961–1992
24th	1982 (Nov)	Albert Reynolds (FF)	Patrick Cooney (FG)	Mary O'Rourke (FF)	Gerry L'Estrange (FG)	4 seats 1961–1992
25th	1987	Albert Reynolds (FF)	Patrick Cooney (FG)	Mary O'Rourke (FF)	Henry Abbott (FF)	4 seats 1961–1992
26th	1989	Albert Reynolds (FF)	Louis Belton (FG)	Mary O'Rourke (FF)	Paul McGrath (FG)	4 seats 1961–1992
27th	1992	Constituency abolished. See Longford–Roscommon and Westmeath				

Dáil	Election	Deputy (Party)	Deputy (Party)	Deputy (Party)	Deputy (Party)	Deputy (Party)
30th	2007	Willie Penrose (Lab)	Peter Kelly (FF)	Mary O'Rourke (FF)	James Bannon (FG)	4 seats 2007–2024
31st	2011	Willie Penrose (Lab)	Robert Troy (FF)	Nicky McFadden (FG)	James Bannon (FG)	4 seats 2007–2024
31st	2014 by-election	Willie Penrose (Lab)	Robert Troy (FF)	Gabrielle McFadden (FG)	James Bannon (FG)	4 seats 2007–2024
32nd	2016	Willie Penrose (Lab)	Robert Troy (FF)	Kevin "Boxer" Moran (Ind.)	Peter Burke (FG)	4 seats 2007–2024
33rd	2020	Sorca Clarke (SF)	Robert Troy (FF)	Joe Flaherty (FF)	Peter Burke (FG)	4 seats 2007–2024
34th	2024	Sorca Clarke (SF)	Robert Troy (FF)	Kevin "Boxer" Moran (Ind.)	Peter Burke (FG)	Micheál Carrigy (FG)
