= Alex White (Irish politician) =

Irish former politician (born 1958)

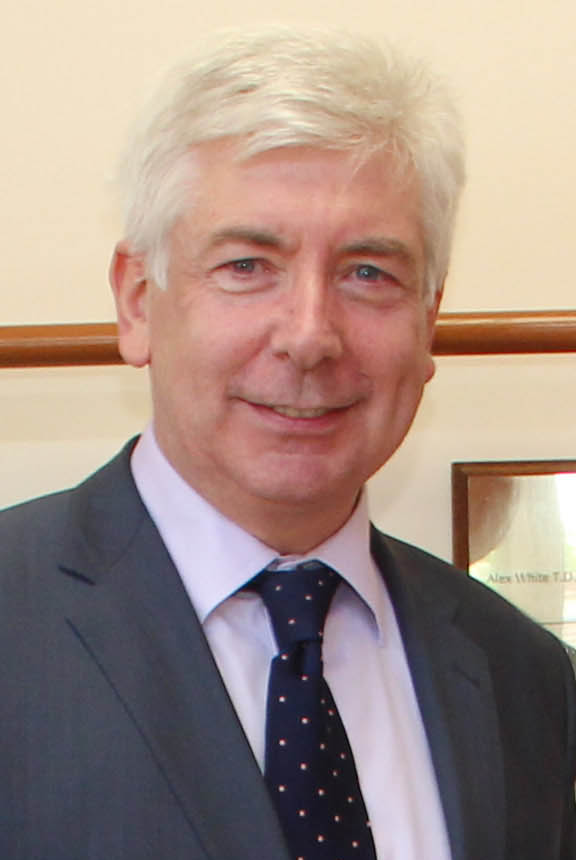

Minister for Communications, Energy and Natural Resources
- In office 11 July 2014 – 6 May 2016
- Taoiseach: Enda Kenny
- Preceded by: Pat Rabbitte
- Succeeded by: Denis Naughten

Minister of State
- 2012–2014: Health

Teachta Dála
- In office February 2011 – February 2016
- Constituency: Dublin South

Leader of the Labour Party in the Seanad
- In office 13 September 2007 – 8 March 2011
- Leader: Eamon Gilmore
- Preceded by: Brendan Ryan
- Succeeded by: Phil Prendergast

Senator
- In office 13 September 2007 – 25 February 2011
- Constituency: Cultural and Educational Panel

Personal details
- Born: Alexander White; 3 December 1958 (age 67) Marino, Dublin, Ireland
- Party: Labour Party
- Spouse: Mary Corcoran (m. 1989)
- Children: 2
- Education: Trinity College Dublin; King's Inns

Alex White (born 3 December 1958) is an Irish lawyer and a former Labour Party politician. Since January 2023 he has been Director General of the Institute of International and European Affairs, a think-tank based in Dublin. White served as Minister for Communications, Energy and Natural Resources from 2014 to 2016, Minister of State for Primary Care from 2012 to 2014 and Leader of the Labour Party in the Seanad 2007 to 2011. He served as a Teachta Dála (TD) for the Dublin South constituency from 2011 to 2016. He was a Senator for the Cultural and Educational Panel from 2007 to 2011.

== Early life ==
White grew up in Marino, Dublin. He was educated at Chanel College, Coolock, and later at Trinity College Dublin and King's Inns. He was called to the Bar in 1987.

White was a student activist in Trinity College, where he was involved with the TCD Students' Union and also for a time a supporter of various Trotskyist groupings, including the League for a Workers Republic. He was later a national officer of Aontas na Mac Léinn in Éirinn (AMLÉ), formerly the Union of Students in Ireland (USI). During his time as a producer with RTÉ, he was active in the SIPTU trade union. In common with Mary McAleese, he was attacked and criticised by a group led by Eoghan Harris and associated with the Workers' Party, over what they perceived as their bias towards Republican groups in the North. White was a strong opponent of Section 31 of the Broadcasting Act, which prevented Sinn Féin members from being heard. White has a long record of involvement in campaigns to further the equal rights of women. He actively campaigned for divorce in 1986 and 1995, and was a Director of Elections for the Anti-Amendment campaign on the North side of Dublin in 1983.

== Political career ==
He was first elected to South Dublin County Council in 2004, for the Terenure-Rathfarnham local electoral area. He was an unsuccessful candidate at the 2007 general election in the Dublin South constituency.

White was nominated as a general election candidate in 2007, by the Labour Party leadership. He had voted for a coalition with Fine Gael in a Labour Party congress (the line of Pat Rabbitte, then leader of the party). His election to the Seanad was due to a voting pact with Sinn Féin.

He was the Labour Party candidate in the 2009 by-election in Dublin South. He came second behind the former RTÉ economics editor George Lee. White was his party's Seanad group leader and Spokesperson on Children between 2007 and February 2011, when he was elected to the Dáil. He subsequently was appointed as Chairman of the Joint Oireachtas Committee on Finance, Public Expenditure and Reform.

White was the leader of an Oireachtas delegation that met the Bundestag's Budgetary and European Affairs committees in Berlin in late January 2012.

White was formally nominated for the position of Minister of State for Primary Care by Eamon Gilmore on 27 September 2012, following the resignation of Róisín Shortall.

Following the resignation of Eamon Gilmore as Leader of the Labour Party, in the aftermath of Labour's poor result at the 2014 local and European elections, White announced his candidacy for the party leadership. On 4 July 2014, Joan Burton was elected as Labour Party leader, defeating White by 77% to 22%.

Alex White played a key role in the 2015 marriage equality referendum campaign.

On 11 July 2014, he was appointed Minister for Communications, Energy and Natural Resources.

White lost his seat at the 2016 general election. He remained Minister for Communications, Energy and Natural Resources during prolonged talks on government formation.

In June 2017, he was co-opted to fill a vacancy on Dún Laoghaire–Rathdown County Council.

In January 2019, White was selected as the Labour Party candidate for the Dublin constituency in the 2019 European Parliament election. He got 18,293 first-preference votes (5.0%) but was not elected.

White returned full-time to the Irish Bar in 2016 and continues to practise as a Senior Counsel. He was recently chair of the Employment Bar Association. In January 2023 he was appointed as Director General of the Institute of International and European Affairs.

Political offices
Preceded by Róisín Shortall	Minister of State for Primary Care; 2012–2014	Succeeded by Kathleen Lynch
Preceded by Pat Rabbitte	Minister for Communications, Energy and Natural Resources; 2014–2016	Succeeded by Denis Naughten

Dáil	Election	Deputy (Party)	Deputy (Party)	Deputy (Party)	Deputy (Party)	Deputy (Party)	Deputy (Party)	Deputy (Party)
2nd	1921	Thomas Kelly (SF)	Daniel McCarthy (SF)	Constance Markievicz (SF)	Cathal Ó Murchadha (SF)	4 seats 1921–1923		
3rd	1922	Thomas Kelly (PT-SF)	Daniel McCarthy (PT-SF)	William O'Brien (Lab)	Myles Keogh (Ind.)	4 seats 1921–1923		
4th	1923	Philip Cosgrave (CnaG)	Daniel McCarthy (CnaG)	Constance Markievicz (Rep)	Myles Keogh (Ind.)	Cathal Ó Murchadha (Rep)	Michael Hayes (CnaG)	Peadar Doyle (CnaG)
4th	1923 by-election	Philip Cosgrave (CnaG)	Daniel McCarthy (CnaG)	Constance Markievicz (Rep)	Myles Keogh (Ind.)	Cathal Ó Murchadha (Rep)	Hugh Kennedy (CnaG)	Peadar Doyle (CnaG)
4th	March 1924 by-election	James O'Mara (CnaG)	Daniel McCarthy (CnaG)	Constance Markievicz (Rep)	Myles Keogh (Ind.)	Cathal Ó Murchadha (Rep)	Hugh Kennedy (CnaG)	Peadar Doyle (CnaG)
4th	November 1924 by-election	James O'Mara (CnaG)	Daniel McCarthy (CnaG)	Constance Markievicz (Rep)	Myles Keogh (Ind.)	Cathal Ó Murchadha (Rep)	Seán Lemass (SF)	Peadar Doyle (CnaG)
4th	1925 by-election	James O'Mara (CnaG)	Thomas Hennessy (CnaG)	Constance Markievicz (Rep)	Myles Keogh (Ind.)	Cathal Ó Murchadha (Rep)	Seán Lemass (SF)	Peadar Doyle (CnaG)
5th	1927 (Jun)	James Beckett (CnaG)	Vincent Rice (NL)	Constance Markievicz (FF)	Myles Keogh (Ind.)	Thomas Lawlor (Lab)	Seán Lemass (FF)	Peadar Doyle (CnaG)
5th	1927 by-election	James Beckett (CnaG)	Vincent Rice (NL)	Thomas Hennessy (CnaG)	Myles Keogh (Ind.)	Thomas Lawlor (Lab)	Seán Lemass (FF)	Peadar Doyle (CnaG)
6th	1927 (Sep)	James Beckett (CnaG)	Robert Briscoe (FF)	Thomas Hennessy (CnaG)	Myles Keogh (CnaG)	Frank Kerlin (FF)	Seán Lemass (FF)	Peadar Doyle (CnaG)
7th	1932	James Beckett (CnaG)	Robert Briscoe (FF)	Thomas Hennessy (CnaG)	Myles Keogh (CnaG)	James Lynch (FF)	Seán Lemass (FF)	Peadar Doyle (CnaG)
8th	1933	James Beckett (CnaG)	Robert Briscoe (FF)	James McGuire (CnaG)	Thomas Kelly (FF)	James Lynch (FF)	Seán Lemass (FF)	Peadar Doyle (CnaG)
9th	1937	Myles Keogh (FG)	Robert Briscoe (FF)	Thomas Lawlor (Lab)	Thomas Kelly (FF)	Joseph Hannigan (Ind.)	Seán Lemass (FF)	Peadar Doyle (FG)
10th	1938	James Beckett (FG)	Robert Briscoe (FF)	James Lynch (FF)	Thomas Kelly (FF)	Joseph Hannigan (Ind.)	Seán Lemass (FF)	Peadar Doyle (FG)
10th	1939 by-election	John McCann (FF)	Robert Briscoe (FF)	James Lynch (FF)	Thomas Kelly (FF)	Joseph Hannigan (Ind.)	Seán Lemass (FF)	Peadar Doyle (FG)
11th	1943	Maurice Dockrell (FG)	Robert Briscoe (FF)	James Lynch (FF)	James Larkin Jnr (Lab)	John McCann (FF)	Seán Lemass (FF)	Peadar Doyle (FG)
12th	1944	Maurice Dockrell (FG)	Robert Briscoe (FF)	James Lynch (FF)	James Larkin Jnr (Lab)	John McCann (FF)	Seán Lemass (FF)	Peadar Doyle (FG)
13th	1948	Constituency abolished. See Dublin South-Central, Dublin South-East and Dublin South-West.						

Dáil	Election	Deputy (Party)	Deputy (Party)	Deputy (Party)	Deputy (Party)	Deputy (Party)
22nd	1981	Niall Andrews (FF)	Séamus Brennan (FF)	Nuala Fennell (FG)	John Kelly (FG)	Alan Shatter (FG)
23rd	1982 (Feb)	Niall Andrews (FF)	Séamus Brennan (FF)	Nuala Fennell (FG)	John Kelly (FG)	Alan Shatter (FG)
24th	1982 (Nov)	Niall Andrews (FF)	Séamus Brennan (FF)	Nuala Fennell (FG)	John Kelly (FG)	Alan Shatter (FG)
25th	1987	Tom Kitt (FF)	Séamus Brennan (FF)	Anne Colley (PDs)	John Kelly (FG)	Alan Shatter (FG)
26th	1989	Tom Kitt (FF)	Séamus Brennan (FF)	Nuala Fennell (FG)	Roger Garland (GP)	Alan Shatter (FG)
27th	1992	Tom Kitt (FF)	Séamus Brennan (FF)	Liz O'Donnell (PDs)	Eithne FitzGerald (Lab)	Alan Shatter (FG)
28th	1997	Tom Kitt (FF)	Séamus Brennan (FF)	Liz O'Donnell (PDs)	Olivia Mitchell (FG)	Alan Shatter (FG)
29th	2002	Tom Kitt (FF)	Séamus Brennan (FF)	Liz O'Donnell (PDs)	Olivia Mitchell (FG)	Eamon Ryan (GP)
30th	2007	Tom Kitt (FF)	Séamus Brennan (FF)	Alan Shatter (FG)	Olivia Mitchell (FG)	Eamon Ryan (GP)
30th	2009 by-election	Tom Kitt (FF)	George Lee (FG)	Alan Shatter (FG)	Olivia Mitchell (FG)	Eamon Ryan (GP)
31st	2011	Shane Ross (Ind.)	Peter Mathews (FG)	Alan Shatter (FG)	Olivia Mitchell (FG)	Alex White (Lab)
32nd	2016	Constituency abolished. See Dublin Rathdown, Dublin South-West and Dún Laoghaire.				
