= Dungarvan Town Council =

Former local authority of town in Ireland

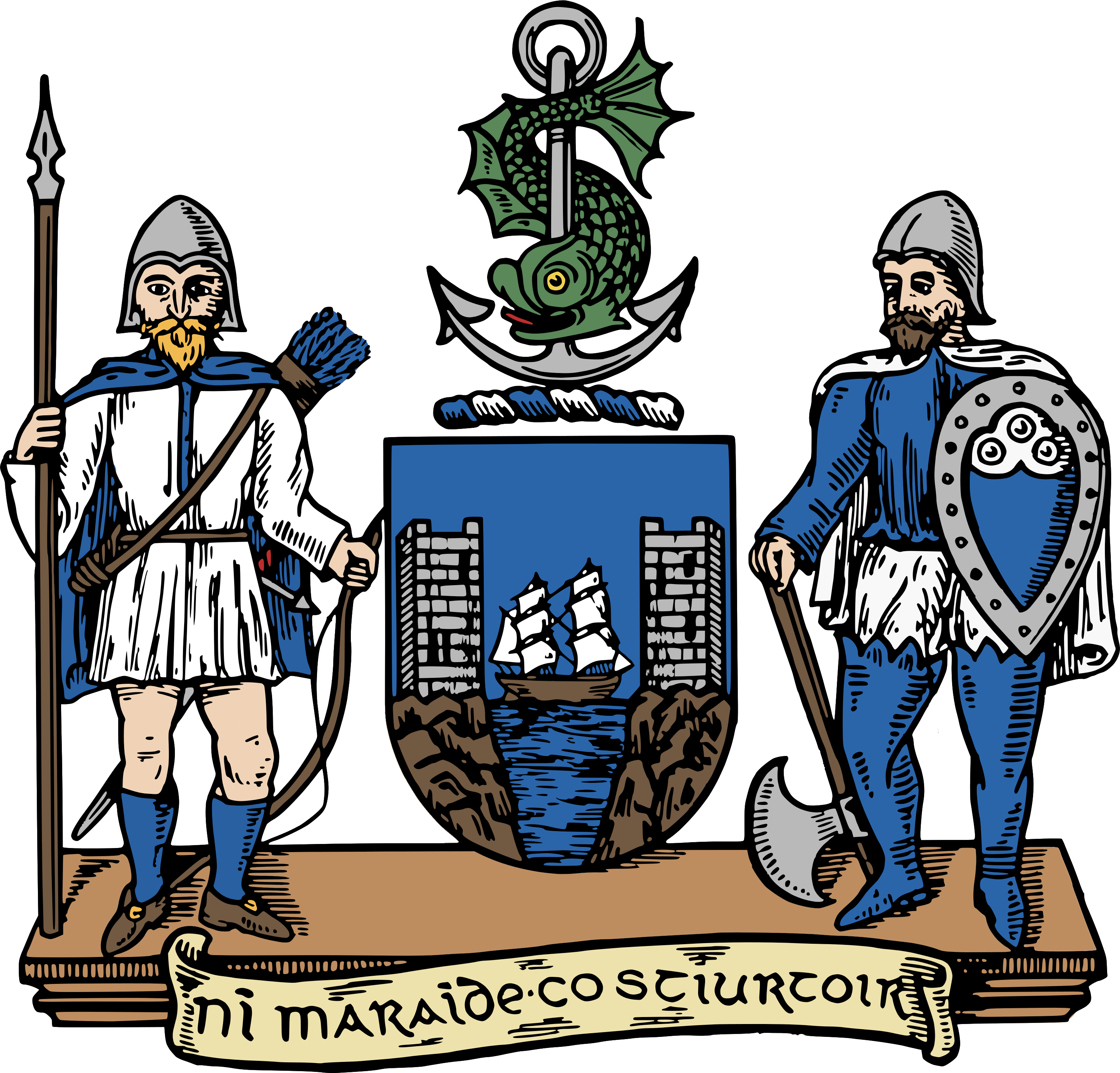
- The arms of Dungarvan's town commissioners were adopted in 1863

Type
- Type: Town council

History
- Founded: 1855 (as town commissioners)
- Disbanded: 2014

Elections
- Last election: 2009 Irish local elections

Meeting place
- Civic Offices, Dungarvan

Dungarvan Town Council, previously known as Dungarvan Urban District Council, was responsible for administration and some public services in Dungarvan, County Waterford. Records date the establishment of town commissioners in Dungarvan to 1855, being replaced by an urban district council in 1899. Later becoming a town council, the local administrative body was abolished in 2014 as part of reforms under the Local Government Reform Act 2014.

== History ==
=== Predecessors ===
The earliest Dungarvan local council in surviving records was 'The Portreeve & Commons of the Town of Dungarvan', which is mentioned in an act of Edward IV's parliament held in Wexford in 1463, as follows:

"As the Seigniory of Dungarvan was the most great and antient honour of the King of Ireland, which through war etc., was for the most part destroyed...it was ordained that the Portreeve and Commonalty may have and enjoy all manner of free grants, liberties, privileges and customs as the tenants and inhabitants of the honourable Manor of Clare in England enjoyed, with a further power to take customs of all kinds of merchandise bought and sold within the franchises as the Mayor and Commons of Bristol did, the profits to go to the reparation of the walls and towers under the survey of the Earl of Desmond."

The earliest portreeve in surviving records was Jermyn Tuke of 1511. The earliest known native Irishman in the commons was Teigh O'Molgan, found in a list of jurors in the 1537 document Presentment of the Tenants and Burgesses of the Manor of Dungarvan.

James I granted a charter to Dungarvan in 1609 or 1610 to establish an elected corporation. This corporation consisted of a sovereign, twelve brethren and various burgesses. These positions were elected from and by the burgesses annually. The burgesses would, in turn, appoint positions of Recorder, Town Clerk, two "Serjeants [sic] at Mace and a water bailiff," and this body had the power to hold a Court of D'Oyer Hundred twice annually to make by-laws. The sovereign and recorder had the role of Justices of the Peace and would hold a Court of Record every Monday and a Court leet twice annually. The ultimate duties of this corporation included building a prison, making reparations to "the walls" and oversight and taxation of the local market. As its capture was recorded in 1642, we know that a town hall was in existence at that time and it is believed some of that building was incorporated into the Old Market House on the Main Street.

A further charter was granted to Dungarvan by James II on 15 April 1689, but this was short-lived due to the coming of power of William III. In spite of the 1689 charter it is believed the corporation may have ceased to exist before then, considering the writing of Sir Richard Cox in 1680 which notes, "The town is a decayed corporation which still sends Burgesses to Parliament," and the fact that Dungarvan fails to appear in the Poll Money Ordinances of 1660/1661.

Seneschals are recorded for the town from Thomas Barbon, appointed in 1746, until the appointment of Peter Bayly in May 1807, but there is a William Penny found in church records, whose epitaph reads, "Late Seneschal of Dungarvan." The last believed to hold the position was John Hudson of Youghal, an employee of the Duke of Devonshire, and a newcomer to the town in 1809.

A commissioners' report dated 1833 stated: "We examined one gentleman, of very great age, a native of this town, who stated that he had never known or conversed with any person who recollected the existence of a Corporation, or any Corporate officer in the town."

=== Town Commissioners and later development ===
Following the Towns Improvement (Ireland) Act 1854, plans were drawn up which provided for a town meeting and the decision to have the town under "Municipal Government". On 29 January 1855, 15 commissioners were elected to the new town commissioners. Projects undertaken by the commissioners included the development of a town park in the mid-1890s. Administration continued from then, but many records were destroyed over the years.

Following the Local Government (Ireland) Act 1898, the town commissioners were replaced by an urban district council (UDC). Councillors elected to the reorganised body held the first meeting of the Dungarvan Urban District Council on 23 January 1899.

The urban district council became a town council in 2002, under the Local Government Act 2001. Along with other similar town councils in Ireland, the body was abolished in 2014 under the Local Government Reform Act 2014. Since 2014, Dungarvan has been administered directly by Waterford City and County Council, with meetings of the Municipal District of Dungarvan—Lismore being held in the Civic Offices, Dungarvan.
