= Joan Burton =

Irish former politician (born 1949)

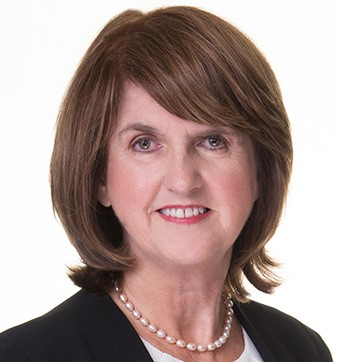
- Burton in 2017

Tánaiste
- In office 4 July 2014 – 6 May 2016
- Taoiseach: Enda Kenny
- Preceded by: Eamon Gilmore
- Succeeded by: Frances Fitzgerald

Leader of the Labour Party
- In office 4 July 2014 – 20 May 2016
- Deputy: Alan Kelly
- Preceded by: Eamon Gilmore
- Succeeded by: Brendan Howlin

Minister for Social Protection
- In office 9 March 2011 – 6 May 2016
- Taoiseach: Enda Kenny
- Preceded by: Éamon Ó Cuív
- Succeeded by: Leo Varadkar

Deputy leader of the Labour Party
- In office 4 October 2007 – 4 July 2014
- Leader: Eamon Gilmore
- Preceded by: Liz McManus
- Succeeded by: Alan Kelly

Minister of State
- 1994–1997: Foreign Affairs
- 1993–1994: Social Welfare

Teachta Dála
- In office May 2002 – February 2020
- In office November 1992 – June 1997
- Constituency: Dublin West

Personal details
- Born: 1 February 1949 (age 77) Stoneybatter, Dublin, Ireland
- Party: Labour Party
- Spouse: Patrick Carroll (m. 1978)
- Children: 1
- Education: University College Dublin

Joan Burton (born 1 February 1949) is an Irish former Labour Party politician who served as Tánaiste and leader of the Labour Party from 2014 to 2016. She served as a TD for Dublin West from 1992 to 1997 and from 2002 to 2020.

== Early life ==
Burton is a native of Stoneybatter, Dublin. She was adopted by the Burton family as a baby and was brought up in Inchicore. Her father worked in the local iron foundry. She was educated at St. Gabriel's National School, Cowper Street St. Joseph Sisters of Charity Secondary School, Stanhope Street and University College Dublin, where she graduated with a degree in commerce. She is also a fellow of the Institute of Chartered Accountants. She has worked as a lecturer in accountancy at the Dublin Institute of Technology and the University of Dar es Salaam, Tanzania.

== Political career ==
=== Early years: 1989–1997 ===
Burton first stood for election at the 1989 general election, as one of two Labour Party candidates in Dublin Central. At the 1991 Dublin County Council election in Fingal, she was elected for the Mulhuddart local electoral area.

Burton was first elected to Dáil Éireann at the 1992 general election as a Labour Party TD for Dublin West in the 27th Dáil. She was appointed Minister of State at the Department of Social Welfare with responsibility for poverty in the Fianna Fáil–Labour Party coalition that was formed in January 1993. Labour left the coalition in November 1994. In December 1994, a Rainbow Coalition of Fine Gael–Labour–Democratic Left was formed, and Burton was appointed Minister of State at the Department of Foreign Affairs. She held this position until the coalition stood down after the 1997 general election.

=== Loss of seat and re-election: 1997–2007 ===
She lost her seat at the 1997 general election to Joe Higgins of the Socialist Party. Burton was elected at the 1999 Fingal County Council election for the Castleknock local electoral area. She was re-elected to the Dáil for Dublin West at the 2002 general election. She was appointed Labour Party Spokesperson for Finance. She was a candidate for the deputy leadership of the party in 2002, obtaining 24% of the first preference vote. From 1997 to 2002, she had returned to lecturing.

=== Labour Deputy leadership: 2007–2014 ===
Burton became deputy leader of the Labour Party in September 2007. She was re-elected for Dublin West at the 2011 general election, topping the poll with 9,627 votes, and was the first TD in the country to be elected to the 31st Dáil. Fine Gael and Labour formed a coalition government, in which Burton was appointed as Minister for Social Protection.

=== Labour Leadership: 2014–2016 ===
Following a significant loss of seats at the 2014 2014 local elections and European Parliament election, Eamon Gilmore resigned as Labour Party leader. On 4 July 2014, Burton won the leadership election, defeating Alex White by 78% to 22%. Upon her election she said that the Labour Party "would focus on social repair, and govern more with the heart". She became the first woman to lead the Labour Party. Burton was appointed as Tánaiste, with Burton remaining as Minister for Social Protection. In a reshuffle of Labour ministers, Gilmore, Pat Rabbitte and Ruairi Quinn (three former party leaders) stood down, and Alex White, Jan O'Sullivan, and Alan Kelly were appointed to cabinet. During her term as leader and Tánaiste, her contribution was key to preventing the sell-off of State assets, protecting core welfare payments and increasing the minimum wage twice.

A month before the 2016 general election, a Millward Browne poll projected she would lose her constituency seat; however, she retained her Dublin West seat. The Labour Party fell to 7 seats, down from 37 at the previous election.

At a Women in Media conference that took place in April 2016, Burton discussed how women were excluded from the government negotiation process. She criticized what she called the misogyny and abuse female politicians faced during the election, as well as the "vulgar, crude, and demeaning" Late Late Show broadcast during the election that offered Freudian interpretations of politicians' body language.

Burton remained as Tánaiste and Minister for Social Protection until 6 May 2016 during prolonged talks on government formation. On 10 May 2016, she announced her resignation as Labour Party leader, which took effect on 20 May 2016 when her replacement Brendan Howlin was elected unopposed.

She lost her seat at the 2020 general election, with her first preference vote declining from 15.4% to 4.8%.

Political offices
Preceded by Office vacant	Minister of State at the Department of Social Welfare; 1993–1994	Succeeded by Bernard Durkan
Preceded by Tom Kitt	Minister of State at the Department of Foreign Affairs; 1994–1997	Succeeded by Liz O'Donnell
Preceded by Éamon Ó Cuív	Minister for Social Protection; 2011–2016	Succeeded by Leo Varadkar
Preceded by Eamon Gilmore	Tánaiste; 2014–2016	Succeeded by Frances Fitzgerald
Party political offices
Preceded by Liz McManus	Deputy leader of the Labour Party; 2007–2014	Succeeded by Alan Kelly
Preceded by Eamon Gilmore	Leader of the Labour Party; 2014–2016	Succeeded by Brendan Howlin

Dáil	Election	Deputy (Party)	Deputy (Party)	Deputy (Party)	Deputy (Party)	Deputy (Party)
22nd	1981	Jim Mitchell (FG)	Brian Lenihan Snr (FF)	Richard Burke (FG)	Eileen Lemass (FF)	Brian Fleming (FG)
23rd	1982 (Feb)	Jim Mitchell (FG)	Brian Lenihan Snr (FF)	Richard Burke (FG)	Liam Lawlor (FF)	Brian Fleming (FG)
23rd	1982 by-election	Jim Mitchell (FG)	Brian Lenihan Snr (FF)	Liam Skelly (FG)	Liam Lawlor (FF)	Brian Fleming (FG)
24th	1982 (Nov)	Jim Mitchell (FG)	Brian Lenihan Snr (FF)	Liam Skelly (FG)	Eileen Lemass (FF)	Tomás Mac Giolla (WP)
25th	1987	Jim Mitchell (FG)	Brian Lenihan Snr (FF)	Pat O'Malley (PDs)	Liam Lawlor (FF)	Tomás Mac Giolla (WP)
26th	1989	Jim Mitchell (FG)	Brian Lenihan Snr (FF)	Austin Currie (FG)	Liam Lawlor (FF)	Tomás Mac Giolla (WP)
27th	1992	Joan Burton (Lab)	Brian Lenihan Snr (FF)	Austin Currie (FG)	Liam Lawlor (FF)	4 seats 1992–2002
27th	1996 by-election	Joan Burton (Lab)	Brian Lenihan Jnr (FF)	Austin Currie (FG)	Liam Lawlor (FF)	4 seats 1992–2002
28th	1997	Joe Higgins (SP)	Brian Lenihan Jnr (FF)	Austin Currie (FG)	Liam Lawlor (FF)	4 seats 1992–2002
29th	2002	Joe Higgins (SP)	Brian Lenihan Jnr (FF)	Joan Burton (Lab)	3 seats 2002–2011	
30th	2007	Leo Varadkar (FG)	Brian Lenihan Jnr (FF)	Joan Burton (Lab)	3 seats 2002–2011	
31st	2011	Leo Varadkar (FG)	Brian Lenihan Jnr (FF)	Joan Burton (Lab)	Joe Higgins (SP)	4 seats 2011–2024
31st	2011 by-election	Leo Varadkar (FG)	Patrick Nulty (Lab)	Joan Burton (Lab)	Joe Higgins (SP)	4 seats 2011–2024
31st	2014 by-election	Leo Varadkar (FG)	Ruth Coppinger (SP)	Joan Burton (Lab)	Joe Higgins (SP)	4 seats 2011–2024
32nd	2016	Leo Varadkar (FG)	Ruth Coppinger (AAA–PBP)	Joan Burton (Lab)	Jack Chambers (FF)	4 seats 2011–2024
33rd	2020	Leo Varadkar (FG)	Paul Donnelly (SF)	Roderic O'Gorman (GP)	Jack Chambers (FF)	4 seats 2011–2024
34th	2024	Emer Currie (FG)	Paul Donnelly (SF)	Roderic O'Gorman (GP)	Jack Chambers (FF)	Ruth Coppinger (PBP–S)
