= Liz McManus =

Irish former politician (born 1950)

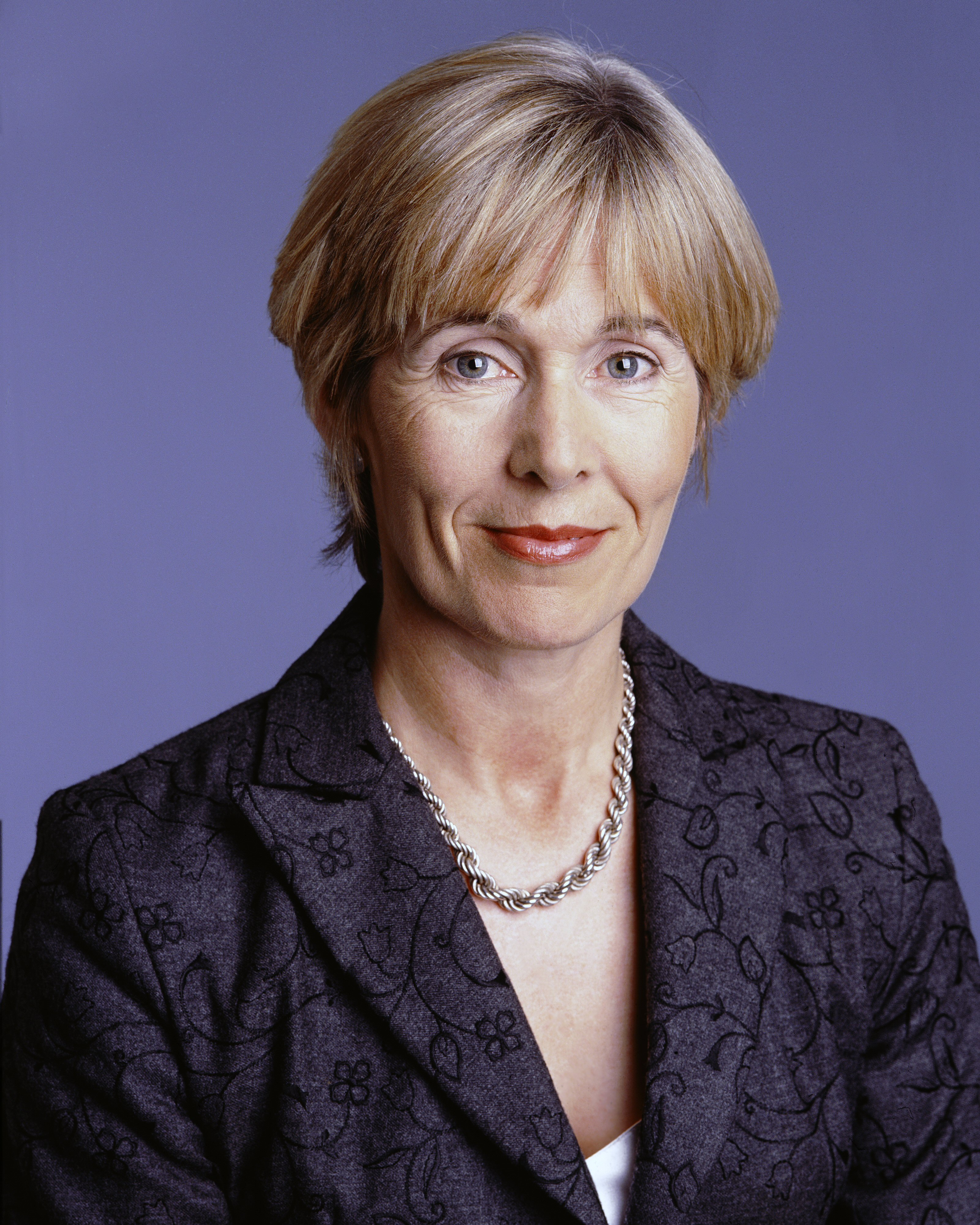
- McManus, c. 2002

Deputy leader of the Labour Party
- In office 25 October 2002 – 4 October 2007
- Leader: Pat Rabbitte
- Preceded by: Brendan Howlin
- Succeeded by: Joan Burton

Minister of State
- 1994–1997: Environment

Teachta Dála
- In office November 1992 – February 2011
- Constituency: Wicklow

Personal details
- Born: 23 March 1947 (age 79) Montreal, Quebec, Canada
- Party: Labour Party (since 1999)
- Other political affiliations: Democratic Left (1992–1999); Workers' Party (1979–1992)
- Spouse: John McManus (m. 1980; div. 2011)
- Children: 4
- Education: University College Dublin
- Website: Official website

Liz McManus (born 23 March 1947) is an Irish former Labour Party politician who served as Deputy leader of the Labour Party from 2002 to 2007 and Minister of State at the Department of the Environment from 1994 to 1997. She served as a Teachta Dála (TD) for the Wicklow constituency from 1992 to 2011.

== Early life and writing career ==
McManus was born in 1947 in Montreal, Quebec, Canada. She studied Architecture at University College Dublin, where she shared a drawing desk with Ruairi Quinn. McManus is an accomplished writer. She has won the Hennessy, Listowel and Irish PEN awards in fiction. Her first novel Acts of Subversion was nominated for the Aer Lingus/Irish Times Literature Prize. McManus was also a weekly columnist with the Sunday Tribune from 1986 until 1992.

== Political career ==
She first ran for political office in 1979, when she was elected to Bray Urban District Council for Sinn Féin the Workers' Party. In 1985 she was elected to Wicklow County Council. She helped establish a women's refuge in Bray in 1978 and was its convenor until 1991.

McManus was first elected to Dáil Éireann at the 1992 general election, as a member of Democratic Left. She retained her seat in every subsequent election until her retirement in 2011. In 1994, Democratic Left formed a government with Fine Gael and the Labour Party, and McManus was appointed as Minister of State at the Department of the Environment, with responsibility for Housing and Urban Renewal, serving until the coalition lost office in 1997. During this period she was also a member of the Northern Ireland Forum for Peace and Reconciliation.

In 1999, Democratic Left merged with the Labour Party, and in 2002 McManus was elected deputy leader of the Labour Party. Another former Democratic Left TD, Pat Rabbitte, became leader of the party. She also became the Labour Party Spokesperson on Health, serving in both positions until 2007.

Following the resignation of Pat Rabbitte on 23 August 2007, she was acting leader of the Labour Party until September 2007, but chose not to stand for re-election as deputy leader, when a deputy leadership election was held. Joan Burton replaced her as deputy leader. She was party spokesperson on Communications, Energy and Natural Resources from 2007 to 2011.

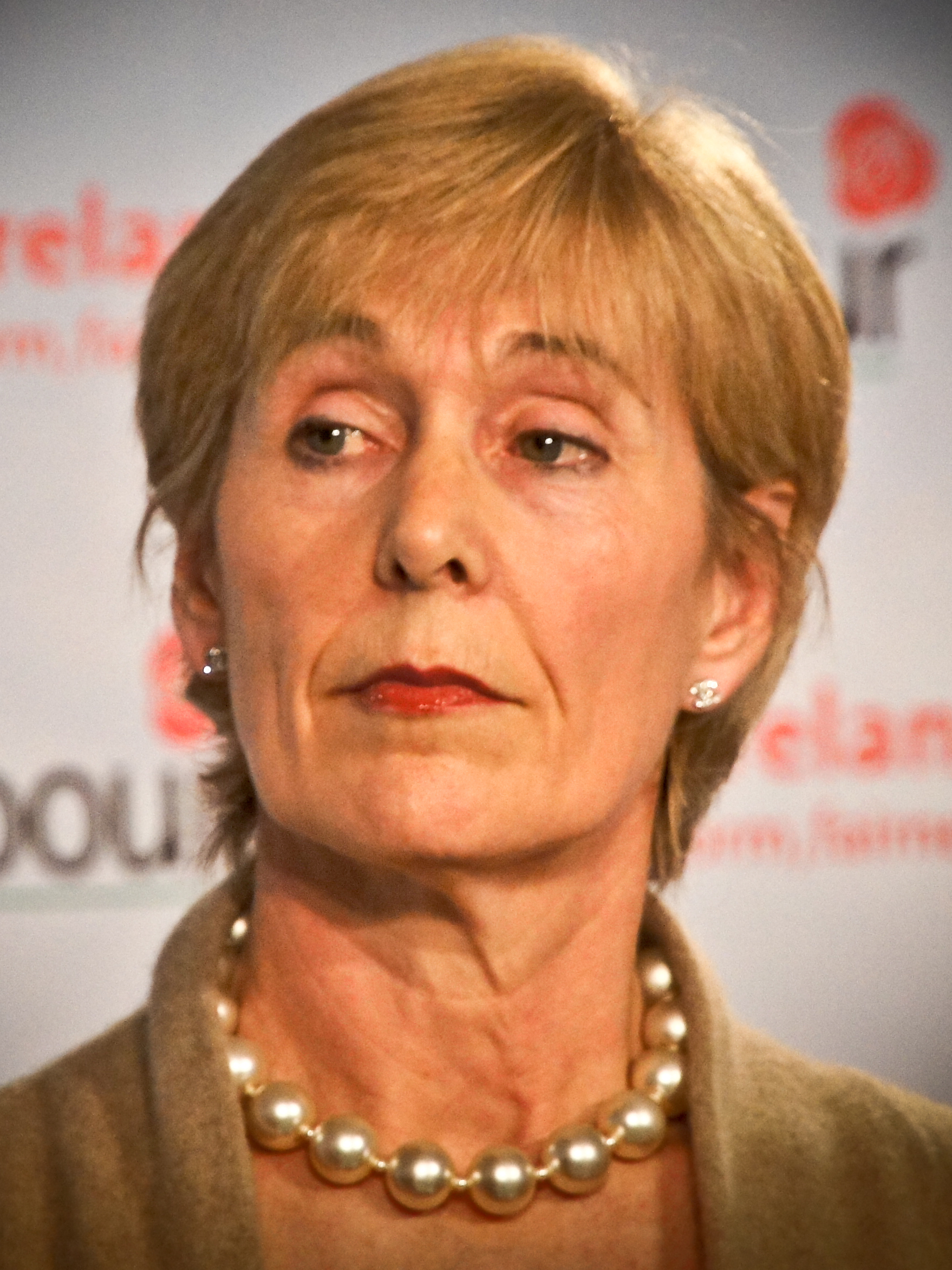
McManus in 2011

She retired from politics at the 2011 general election, which she did not contest.

== Private life ==
She was formerly married to John McManus; the couple had four children. They publicly separated in 2006. John McManus, a physician in general practice, was a Labour member of Bray Town Council from 1999 to 2009.

By February 2015 McManus had been with her new partner, Sean, also active in the Labour Party, for ten years. McManus stated the pair met three weeks after her split from her first husband.

Political offices
Preceded by Brendan Howlin	Deputy leader of Labour Party; 2002–2007	Succeeded by Joan Burton

Dáil	Election	Deputy (Party)	Deputy (Party)	Deputy (Party)	Deputy (Party)	Deputy (Party)
4th	1923	Christopher Byrne (CnaG)	James Everett (Lab)	Richard Wilson (FP)	3 seats 1923–1981	
5th	1927 (Jun)	Séamus Moore (FF)	James Everett (Lab)	Dermot O'Mahony (CnaG)	3 seats 1923–1981	
6th	1927 (Sep)	Séamus Moore (FF)	James Everett (Lab)	Dermot O'Mahony (CnaG)	3 seats 1923–1981	
7th	1932	Séamus Moore (FF)	James Everett (Lab)	Dermot O'Mahony (CnaG)	3 seats 1923–1981	
8th	1933	Séamus Moore (FF)	James Everett (Lab)	Dermot O'Mahony (CnaG)	3 seats 1923–1981	
9th	1937	Séamus Moore (FF)	James Everett (Lab)	Dermot O'Mahony (FG)	3 seats 1923–1981	
10th	1938	Séamus Moore (FF)	James Everett (Lab)	Patrick Cogan (Ind.)	3 seats 1923–1981	
11th	1943	Christopher Byrne (FF)	James Everett (Lab)	Patrick Cogan (CnaT)	3 seats 1923–1981	
12th	1944	Thomas Brennan (FF)	James Everett (NLP)	Patrick Cogan (CnaT)	3 seats 1923–1981	
13th	1948	Thomas Brennan (FF)	James Everett (NLP)	Patrick Cogan (Ind.)	3 seats 1923–1981	
14th	1951	Thomas Brennan (FF)	James Everett (Lab)	Patrick Cogan (Ind.)	3 seats 1923–1981	
14th	1953 by-election	Mark Deering (FG)	James Everett (Lab)	Patrick Cogan (Ind.)	3 seats 1923–1981	
15th	1954	Mark Deering (FG)	James Everett (Lab)	Paudge Brennan (FF)	3 seats 1923–1981	
16th	1957	James O'Toole (FF)	James Everett (Lab)	Paudge Brennan (FF)	3 seats 1923–1981	
17th	1961	Michael O'Higgins (FG)	James Everett (Lab)	Paudge Brennan (FF)	3 seats 1923–1981	
18th	1965	Michael O'Higgins (FG)	James Everett (Lab)	Paudge Brennan (FF)	3 seats 1923–1981	
18th	1968 by-election	Michael O'Higgins (FG)	Godfrey Timmins (FG)	Paudge Brennan (FF)	3 seats 1923–1981	
19th	1969	Liam Kavanagh (Lab)	Godfrey Timmins (FG)	Paudge Brennan (FF)	3 seats 1923–1981	
20th	1973	Liam Kavanagh (Lab)	Godfrey Timmins (FG)	Ciarán Murphy (FF)	3 seats 1923–1981	
21st	1977	Liam Kavanagh (Lab)	Godfrey Timmins (FG)	Ciarán Murphy (FF)	3 seats 1923–1981	
22nd	1981	Liam Kavanagh (Lab)	Godfrey Timmins (FG)	Ciarán Murphy (FF)	Paudge Brennan (FF)	4 seats 1981–1992
23rd	1982 (Feb)	Liam Kavanagh (Lab)	Godfrey Timmins (FG)	Ciarán Murphy (FF)	Gemma Hussey (FG)	4 seats 1981–1992
24th	1982 (Nov)	Liam Kavanagh (Lab)	Godfrey Timmins (FG)	Paudge Brennan (FF)	Gemma Hussey (FG)	4 seats 1981–1992
25th	1987	Liam Kavanagh (Lab)	Joe Jacob (FF)	Dick Roche (FF)	Gemma Hussey (FG)	4 seats 1981–1992
26th	1989	Liam Kavanagh (Lab)	Joe Jacob (FF)	Dick Roche (FF)	Godfrey Timmins (FG)	4 seats 1981–1992
27th	1992	Liam Kavanagh (Lab)	Joe Jacob (FF)	Liz McManus (DL)	Godfrey Timmins (FG)	Johnny Fox (Ind.)
27th	1995 by-election	Liam Kavanagh (Lab)	Joe Jacob (FF)	Liz McManus (DL)	Godfrey Timmins (FG)	Mildred Fox (Ind.)
28th	1997	Dick Roche (FF)	Joe Jacob (FF)	Liz McManus (DL)	Billy Timmins (FG)	Mildred Fox (Ind.)
29th	2002	Dick Roche (FF)	Joe Jacob (FF)	Liz McManus (Lab)	Billy Timmins (FG)	Mildred Fox (Ind.)
30th	2007	Dick Roche (FF)	Joe Behan (FF)	Liz McManus (Lab)	Billy Timmins (FG)	Andrew Doyle (FG)
31st	2011	Simon Harris (FG)	Stephen Donnelly (Ind.)	Anne Ferris (Lab)	Billy Timmins (FG)	Andrew Doyle (FG)
32nd	2016	Simon Harris (FG)	Stephen Donnelly (SD)	John Brady (SF)	Pat Casey (FF)	Andrew Doyle (FG)
33rd	2020	Simon Harris (FG)	Stephen Donnelly (FF)	John Brady (SF)	Jennifer Whitmore (SD)	Steven Matthews (GP)
34th	2024	Simon Harris (FG)	Edward Timmins (FG)	John Brady (SF)	Jennifer Whitmore (SD)	4 seats since 2024
