= 1977 Labour Party leadership election (Ireland) =

Political party leadership election in Ireland

- 1 July 1977
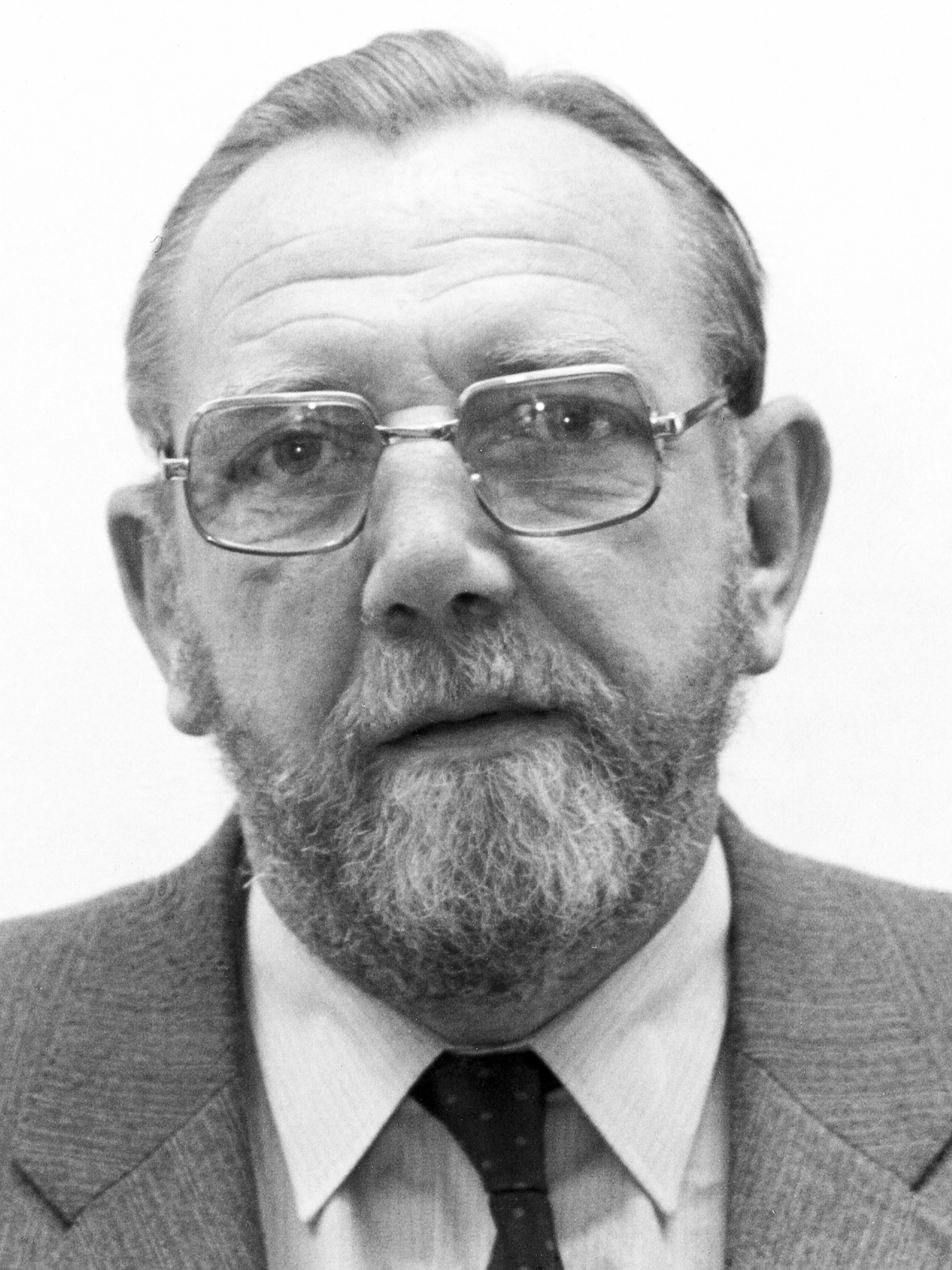

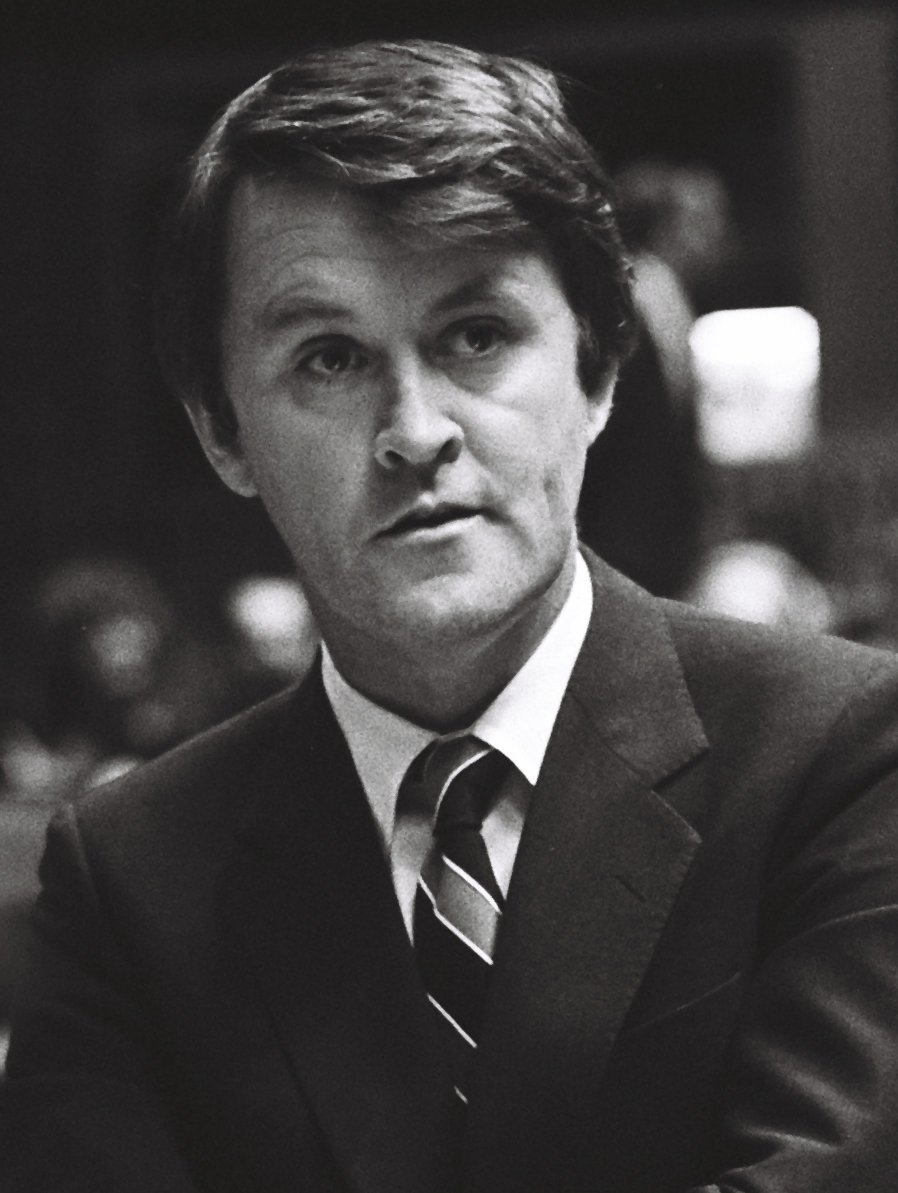
| Candidate | Frank Cluskey | Michael O'Leary |
| Percentage | 56% | 44% |
Leader before election
Brendan Corish
Elected Leader
Frank Cluskey

The 1977 Labour Party leadership election in the Republic of Ireland began following the decision of Brendan Corish not to seek re-election as leader of the Labour Party when Dáil Éireann reconvened after the 1977 general election, where Labour lost three TDs. Corish had led the party for over fifteen years by this point and was approaching sixty, being cited as finding politics as painful and unenjoyable, which likely contributed to his decision to stand down. His successor was elected by the members of the Labour parliamentary party on 1 July 1977. After the first ballot resulted in a tie, the second ballot was won by Frank Cluskey after one member switched preferences.

== Candidates ==
=== Standing ===
- Frank Cluskey, former Parliamentary Secretary for Social Welfare
- Michael O'Leary, former Minister for Labour

== Campaign ==
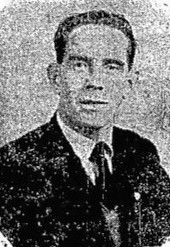
Tully's constituency revisions backfired on Labour, leading to three seats lost in the next election.

During the previous government, both Fine Gael and Labour were predicted to be returned back to power, a belief further solidified by the Electoral (Amendment) Act 1974 or the "Tullymander". The scheme, spearheaded by Minister for Local Government James Tully, was an ambitious attempt to return the coalition back to power by redrawing constituency boundaries in the Greater Dublin Area from four or five member seats to three, with the belief that this would lead to Fianna Fáil, Fine Gael, and Labour each taking one seat. While such constituency revisions were not unusual due to the partisan nature of the boundary commission, with previous Minister for Local Government Kevin Boland having overseen a similar gerrymander prior to the 1969 Irish general election, the radical nature of it left many in Fianna Fáil feeling anxious about their electoral prospects which led to the construction of an exceedingly generous election manifesto.

However, the Tullymander relied on Fianna Fáil not polling above 40% in these three-seater constituencies, which was what happened on polling day. The result left Fianna Fáil with an unprecedented majority of nine seats, while Fine Gael lost twelve seats. Labour lost three high-profile TDs, which were former Minister for Industry and Commerce Justin Keating, former Minister for Posts and Telegraphs Conor Cruise O'Brien, and David Thornley, the latter of whom failed to poll enough to have his deposit returned. Following this poor result, Brendan Corish announced that he would not seek re-election as Labour Party leader, ending his resignation statement as follows:

The people of County Wexford have honoured me as one of their Deputies in the Dail for thirty-two years. I trust I have served them well in the past and hope that I will continue to do so throughout this incoming Dail. Their continued support has been at all times a source of great consolation throughout the trials of public life and particularly over the last four difficult years.

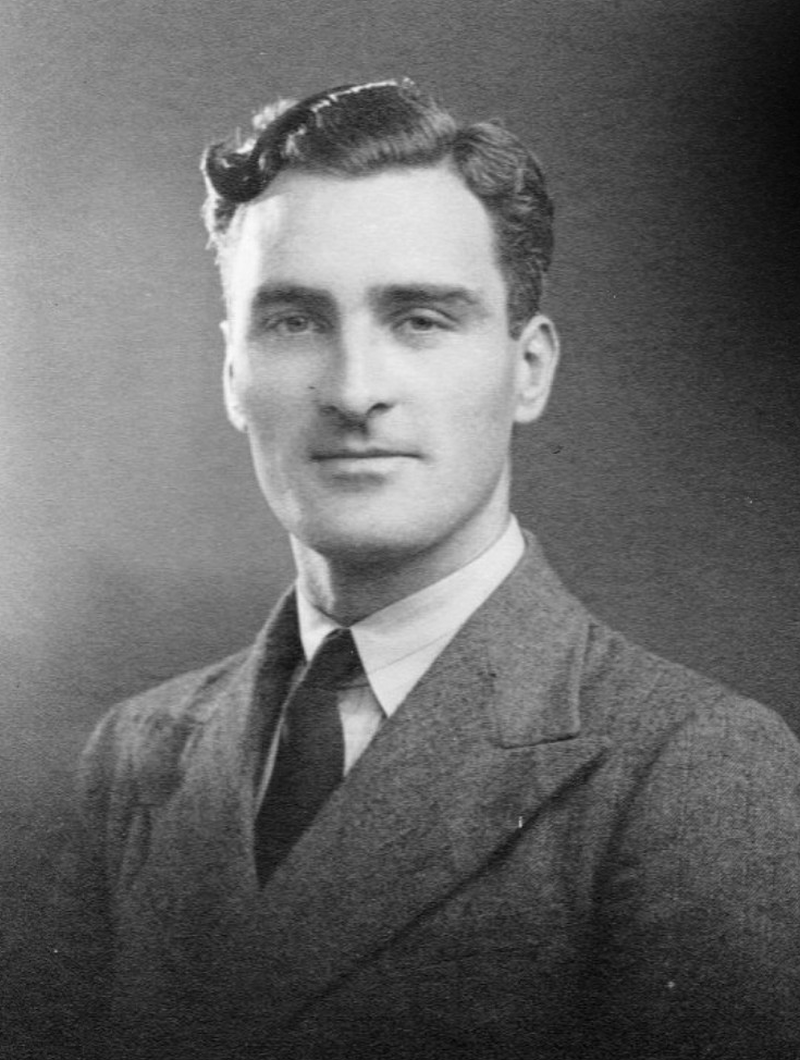
Corish had served as Labour's leader for seventeen years until his resignation.

Only two nominees were made for Labour's next leader, Frank Cluskey and Michael O'Leary. Previously, Corish is believed to have supported O'Leary to become his successor early in the National Coalition government, his loyalties gradually shifted over to Cluskey. The possible reasons for this include Corish growing close to Cluskey while working with him in the Department of Social Welfare and O'Leary's lack of discipline when it came to his ministerial duties and handling of government briefs. This led him to resign immediately after the election, rendering outgoing Ceann Comhairle and O'Leary supporter Sean Treacy ineligible to vote in the contest, leaving only sixteen members to decide Labour's future leader.

Both Cluskey and O'Leary had been rivals for some time and the contest mirrored trade union divisions within the party going back to the 1940s. Cluskey was a member of the Workers' Union of Ireland, and was supported by the two other WUI dáil deputies. Six of the eight Irish Transport and General Workers' Union deputies, strongly encouraged by their general secretary, Michael Mullen, supported O'Leary, who had previously been a liaison officer between the ITGWU and the Labour Party. Mullen's support for O'Leary is also believed to have been influenced by his own strong republican beliefs and distaste for Cluskey's "revisionist" views on Northern Ireland, although O'Leary held similar beliefs.

In the run-up to the election, O'Leary subjected wavering and undecided TDs to intense lobbying, spelling his views on how the party needed to be improved. O'Leary believed that Cluskey's working-class background would put them at a disadvantage when competing against Fine Gael, which was currently beginning the process of adopting a more social-democratic image under the influence of its soon-to-be new leader, Garret Fitzgerald.

== Result ==
On 1 July 1977, members of the parliamentary Labour Party met to elect a new leader through a secret ballot. The result of the first ballot was:

Election: 1 July 1977 - First Ballot
| Candidate | Votes | % |
|---|---|---|
| Frank Cluskey | 8 | 50% |
| Michael O'Leary | 8 | 50% |
| Turnout | 16 | 100% |
Result: Tie

According to Magill, the breakdown of support went as follows:

- Frank Cluskey – Brendan Corish, Eileen Desmond, John Horgan, Barry Desmond, Ruairi Quinn, Joseph Bermingham, and John Ryan.
- Michael O'Leary – James Tully, Michael Pat Murphy, Patrick Kerrigan, Séamus Pattison, John O'Connell, Dan Spring, and Liam Kavanagh.

Apart from the aforementioned trade union split, there was also a notable urban-rural split in where votes went. Only one of Labour's five long-standing rural TDs supported Cluskey, that being Brendan Corish. Meanwhile, only two out of Labour's six Dublin TDs supported O'Leary, those being John O'Connell and O'Leary himself.

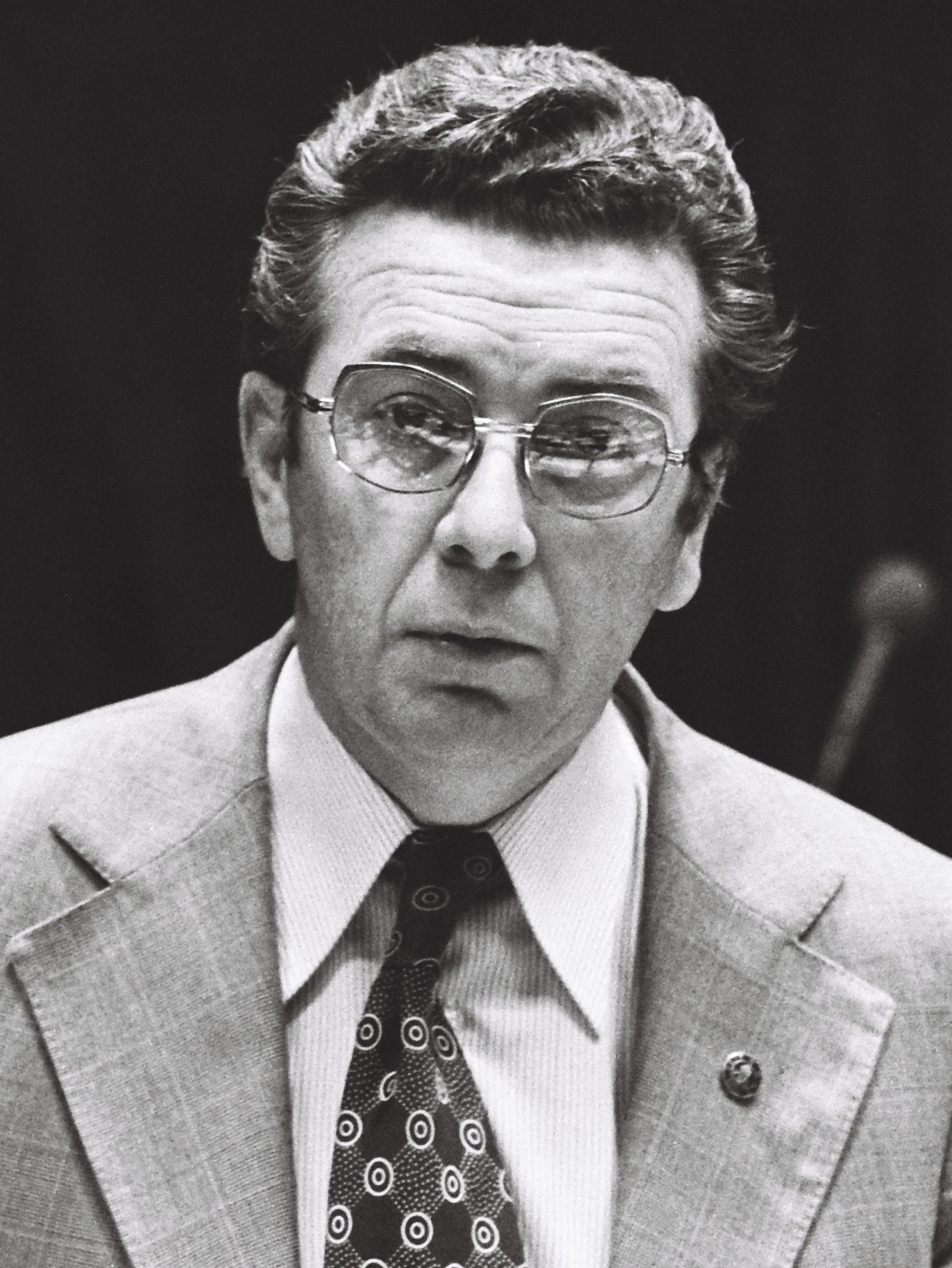
Kavanagh is suspected to have switched his support from O'Leary to Cluskey in the second ballot.

Despite Labour Party procedure at the time dictating that in the event of a tie, a name should be drawn from a hat to decide the winner, there was general discussion on what to do next. Following a suggestion by Ruairi Quinn and after Chairman Joseph Bermingham gave his approval, it was decided that a second vote should be held in the hopes that it would resolve the tie.

Election: 1 July 1977 - Second Ballot
| Candidate | Votes | % |
|---|---|---|
| Frank Cluskey | 9 | 56% |
| Michael O'Leary | 7 | 44% |
| Turnout | 16 | 100% |
Result: Cluskey elected leader

During the second ballot, Frank Cluskey secured his election as leader after one TD defected from O'Leary. According to Gallagher and Magill, Liam Kavanagh is believed to have switched his support during the second round of voting. In light of O'Leary's defeat, Kavanagh proposed that O'Leary be elected deputy leader, which was unanimously agreed upon, alongside being appointed as Labour's spokesperson on Finance.

== Aftermath ==
Despite his election as deputy leader, O'Leary obsessively resented his defeat. As a result, Cluskey excluded him from his inner circle, which he had increasingly filled with a small number of personal advisors and allies. In response, journalists sympathetic to O'Leary kept up a sniping campaign against Cluskey, to the point where O'Leary was order to disavow them publicly as Cluskey grew more paranoid that O'Leary was plotting against him. Soon after, O'Leary had become almost completely ostracised from the party.

A sharp and effective critic of Charles Haughey, on the latter's election as Taoiseach in 1979, Cluskey gave a blistering Dáil speech, castigating Haughey's close relationship with wealthy and influential individuals who operated in "a grey area of Irish business and commercial life." However, lacking natural charisma or a studied polish, Cluskey was less successful in dealings with the news media. His dour, 'shop steward's exterior' failed to appeal to television audiences or the broad electorate. According to an anonymous Labour TD, "Frank [Cluskey] was great with the party but not with the public, while Michael [O'Leary] was great with the public but a disaster in the party."

During the 1981 general election, Cluskey led the Labour Party to a defeat that surpassed their prior election, losing even his own seat in Dublin South-Central. Labour's defeat was attributed to its poor finances, Cluskey's failure to overhaul the party's old organisational apparatus, and an inability to capitalise on the dire economic situation.

Due to becoming an MEP after the 1979 European Parliament election in Ireland, O'Leary was even more isolated from the running of the party despite his positions, having had nothing to do with the party's election programme. With Cluskey being ineligible to continue as leader after having lost his seat, O'Leary was elected as leader unanimously in 1981 after Eileen Desmond and Liam Kavanagh publicly declared their support for him, with O'Leary being forced to give up his seat as MEP so Cluskey could assume it instead, putting a temporary end to a turbulent four years for the Labour Party.
