= Socialist International Women =

- Formation: August 17, 1907
- Headquarters: London
- Location: United Kingdom
- Official language: English, Spanish & French
- President: Janet Camilo
- Website: www.socintwomen.org.uk

Socialist International Women is the international organization of the women's organizations of the socialist, social democratic and labour parties affiliated to the Socialist International.

== History ==
The Women's International Council of Socialist and Labour Organizations was established on August 17, 1907, at the First International Conference of Socialist Women held in Stuttgart. This body constituted the Women's International Secretariat of the Second International and was led by Clara Zetkin. The Socialist International Women trace their origins to this body, through a series of subsequent organisations.

It was named International Socialist Women's Committee founded in 1926 under Edith Kemmis as the women's section of the Labour and Socialist International. This organisation lasted until 1940, when its work came to a halt as a result of the Second World War.

The organisation was refounded in 1955 as the International Council of Social Democratic Women, based in London, following the foundation of the Socialist International in 1951. As the women's section of this organisation it then took on the name of the Socialist International Women in 1978.

== Members ==
The following organizations are Socialist International Women members:

Country	Member	Party	Membership
Albania	Socialist Women's Forum	Socialist Party of Albania	Full
Algeria	National Secretariat for Women's Affairs	Socialist Forces Front	Full
Algeria	National Liberation Front	—N/a	Consultative
Andorra	Secretariat for Gender Policies	Social Democratic Party of Andorra	Full
Angola	Organization of Angolan Women	Popular Movement for the Liberation of Angola	Full
Argentina	Women's Council	Radical Civic Union	Full
Armenia	Women's Committee	Armenian Revolutionary Federation	Full
Azerbaijan	Women's Organisation	Social Democratic Party of Azerbaijan	Full
Belarus	Belarusian Women's League	Belarusian Social Democratic Party	Consultative
Belarus	Women's Network	Belarusian Party of Labour	Observer
Belgium	Inter-Federal Women's Commission	Parti Socialiste	Full
Belgium	Zij-Kant	Parti Socialiste	Full
Belize	United Women's Group	People's United Party	Consultative
Benin	Women's Organisation	Social Democratic Party	Full
Bosnia and Herzegovina	Women's Forum	Social Democratic Party of Bosnia and Herzegovina	Full
Botswana	Women's Wing	Botswana Democratic Party	Consultative
Brazil	Labour Women Action	Democratic Labour Party	Full
Bulgaria	Social Democratic Women's Confederation	Bulgarian Social Democrats	Full
Bulgaria	Union of Socialist Women for Parity and Solidarity	Bulgarian Socialist Party	Full
Burkina Faso	Women's Organisation	People's Movement for Progress	Full
Cameroon	Social Democratic Front	—N/a	Full
Cape Verde	African Party for the Independence of Cape Verde	—N/a	Full
Central African Republic	Movement for the Liberation of the Central African Women	Movement for the Liberation of the Central African People	Observer
Chad	Women's Union for Renewal	National Union for Democracy and Renewal	Consultative
Chile	National Women's Secretariat	Party for Democracy	Full
Chile	National Women's Organisation	Radical Social Democratic Party	Full
Chile	Union of Socialist Women of Chile	Socialist Party of Chile	Full
Colombia	National Organisation for Women	Liberal Party of Colombia	Full
Costa Rica	Women's Movement	National Liberation Party	Full
Croatia	Social Democratic Women's Forum	Social Democratic Party of Croatia	Full
Cyprus	Socialist Women's Movement	Movement for Social Democracy	Full
Cyprus	Women's Organisation	Republican Turkish Party	Full
Cyprus	Communal Democracy Party	—N/a	Consultative
Czech Republic	Social Democratic Women	Czech Social Democratic Party	Full
Democratic Republic of Congo	Union for Democracy and Social Progress	—N/a	Observer
Democratic Republic of Congo	Unified Lumumbist Party	—N/a	Observer
Dominican Republic	Dominican Federation of Social Democratic Women	Dominican Revolutionary Party	Full
Egypt	Women's Secretariat	Egyptian Social Democratic Party	Full
Equatorial Guinea	Convergence for Social Democracy Women's Organisation	Convergence for Social Democracy	Full
Eswatini	People's United Democratic Movement	—N/a	Consultative
Eswatini	Women's Wing	Swazi Democratic Party	Observer
Finland	Social Democratic Women in Finland	Finnish Social Democratic Party	Full
France	National Secretariat for Women's Rights	Socialist Party	Full
Gabon	Progressive Women's Movement	Gabonese Progress Party	Consultative
The Gambia	United Democratic Party	—N/a	Consultative
Georgia	Social Democratic Women's Organisation	Social Democrats for the Development of Georgia	Consultative
Germany	Federation of Social Democratic Women	Social Democratic Party of Germany	Full
Ghana	Women's Wing	National Democratic Congress	Full
Great Britain	Labour Party Women	Labour Party	Observer
Greece	Women's Department	PASOK	Full
Guatemala	Women's Secretariat	National Unity of Hope	Full
Guinea	Women's Organisation	Guinean People's Assembly	Full
Guinea-Bissau	African Party for the Independence of Guinea and Cape Verde	—N/a	Consultative
Haiti	Women's Commission	Union of Haitian Social Democrats	Full
Haiti	Organisation of the People in Struggle	—N/a	Observer
Hungary	Women's Section	Hungarian Socialist Party	Full
India	Indian National Congress	—N/a	Full
Iran	Kurdistan Democratic Women Union	Kurdistan Democratic Party	Full
Iran	Democratic Women's Union of Iranian Kurdistan	Democratic Party of Iranian Kurdistan	Consultative
Iran	Komala Party of Iranian Kurdistan	—N/a	Observer
Iran	Komalah	—N/a	Observer
Iraq	Women's Union of the Patriotic Union of Kurdistan	Patriotic Union of Kurdistan	Full
Ireland	Labour Women's National Council	Labour Party	Full
Israel	Forum for Gender Equality	Meretz	Full
Italy	Women's Commission	Italian Socialist Party	Full
Jamaica	People's National Party Women's Movement	People's National Party	Full
Japan	Women's Department	Social Democratic Party	Full
Kazakhstan	Nationwide Social Democratic Party	—N/a	Full
Kenya	Labour Party of Kenya	—N/a	Observer
Latvia	Social Democratic Party "Harmony"	—N/a	Consultative
Lebanon	Union of Progressive Women in Lebanon	Progressive Socialist Party	Full
Lesotho	Lesotho Congress for Democracy	—N/a	Observer
Lithuania	Lithuanian Social Democratic Women's Union	Lithuanian Social Democratic Party	Full
Malaysia	Women's Section	Democratic Action Party	Full
Mali	African Party for Solidarity and Justice	—N/a	Full
Mali	Women's Union	Assembly for Mali	Full
Mauritania	Women's Commission	Assembly of Democratic Forces	Full
Mauritius	Women's League	Mauritius Labour Party	Full
Mauritius	Mauritius Militant Movement	—N/a	Full
Mexico	National Women's Organisation	Institutional Revolutionary Party	Full
Moldova	Women's Organisation	Democratic Party	Full
Mongolia	Social Democracy - Mongolian Women's Association	Mongolian People's Party	Full
Montenegro	Democratic Party of Socialists of Montenegro	—N/a	Full
Montenegro	Women's Forum	Social Democratic Party of Montenegro	Full
Morocco	National Secretariat for Women	Socialist Union of Popular Forces	Full
Mozambique	Organisation of Mozambican Women	FRELIMO	Full
Namibia	Women's Council	SWAPO	Full
Nepal	Nepal Woman Association	Nepali Congress Party	Full
Nicaragua	Women's Commission	Sandinista National Liberation Front	Full
Niger	Tarayya Women's Organisation	Party for Democracy and Socialism of Niger	Full
Nigeria	All Progressives Congress	—N/a	Consultative
Northern Ireland	Social Democratic and Labour Party Women	Social Democratic and Labour Party	Full
Norway	Women's Network	Norwegian Labour Party	Observer
Pakistan	Women's Wing	Pakistan People's Party	Full
Palestine	Fatah	—N/a	Full
Palestine	Palestinian National Initiative	—N/a	Consultative
Panama	Women's Front	Democratic Revolutionary Party	Full
Paraguay	Progressive Democratic Party	—N/a	Full
Peru	Women's Political Action	Peruvian Aprista Party	Full
Portugal	National Department of Socialist Women	Socialist Party	Full
Puerto Rico	Puerto Rican Independence Party	—N/a	Full
Romania	Social Democratic Women	Social Democratic Party	Full
San Marino	Party of Socialists and Democrats	—N/a	Full
São Tomé and Príncipe	Platform for Human Rights and Gender Equality	Movement for the Liberation of São Tomé and Príncipe/Social Democratic Party	Consultative
Senegal	National Movement of Socialist Women	Socialist Party of Senegal	Full
Serbia	Women's Forum	Democratic Party	Full
Slovakia	Direction – Social Democracy	—N/a	Full
South Africa	African National Congress Women's League	African National Congress	Full
Somaliland	Women's Organisation	Justice and Welfare Party	Observer
Spain	Secretariat for Equality	Spanish Socialist Workers' Party	Full
Sweden	National Federation of Social Democratic Women in Sweden	Swedish Social Democratic Party	Observer
Syria	Democratic Union Party	—N/a	Consultative
Tanzania	Chama Cha Mapinduzi	—N/a	Full
Togo	Democratic Convention of African Peoples	—N/a	Consultative
Tunisia	Democratic Forum for Labour and Liberties	—N/a	Full
Turkey	Women's Branch	Republican People's Party	Full
Turkey	Women's Assembly	Peoples' Democratic Party	Consultative
Ukraine	Ukrainian Roses	Social Democratic Party of Ukraine	Consultative
Uruguay	Commission for Gender and Equality	New Space	Full
Venezuela	National Women's Secretariat	Democratic Action	Full
Venezuela	Movement for Socialism	—N/a	Full
Venezuela	Secretariat for Equality and Gender	A New Era	Full
Venezuela	Voluntad Popular	—N/a	Full
Western Sahara	National Union of Sahrawi Women	Polisario Front	Consultative
Yemen	Women's Department	Yemeni Socialist Party	Full
Zambia	Patriotic Front	—N/a	Consultative
Zimbabwe	Movement for Democratic Change	—N/a	Full

== Former members ==
- Argentina – Women's Secretariat of the Socialist Party
- Austria – Austrian Social Democratic Women of the Social Democratic Party of Austria
- Canada – Participation of Women Committee of the New Democratic Party
- Denmark – Commission for Equality of the Social Democrats
- Estonia – Estonian Social Democratic Party
- Israel – Women's Section of the Israel Labour Party
- Luxembourg – Socialist Women of the Luxembourg Socialist Workers' Party
- Mexico – Secretariat for Gender Equality of the Party of Democratic Revolution
- Poland – Democratic Left Alliance
- Russia – Social Democratic Women of Russia of the A Just Russia
- Switzerland – Social Democratic Women of Switzerland of the Social Democratic Party of Switzerland
- United States – Feminist Commission of the Democratic Socialists of America
- Uruguay – Women's Organisation of the Socialist Party of Uruguay

== Presidents ==
- Nina Andersen (1955–1959)
- Anna Rudling (1966–?)
- Irène Pétry (1972–?)
- Lydie Schmit (1980–1984)
- Mercedes Cabanillas
- Anita Gradin (1986–?)
- Audrey McLaughlin (1996–1999)
- Maria Dolors Renau (1999–2003)
- Pia Locatelli (2003–2012)
- Ouafa Hajji (2012–2022)
- Janet Camilo (2022–present)

== See also ==
- International Socialist Women's Conferences
