= Rebecca Moynihan =

Irish politician (born 1981)

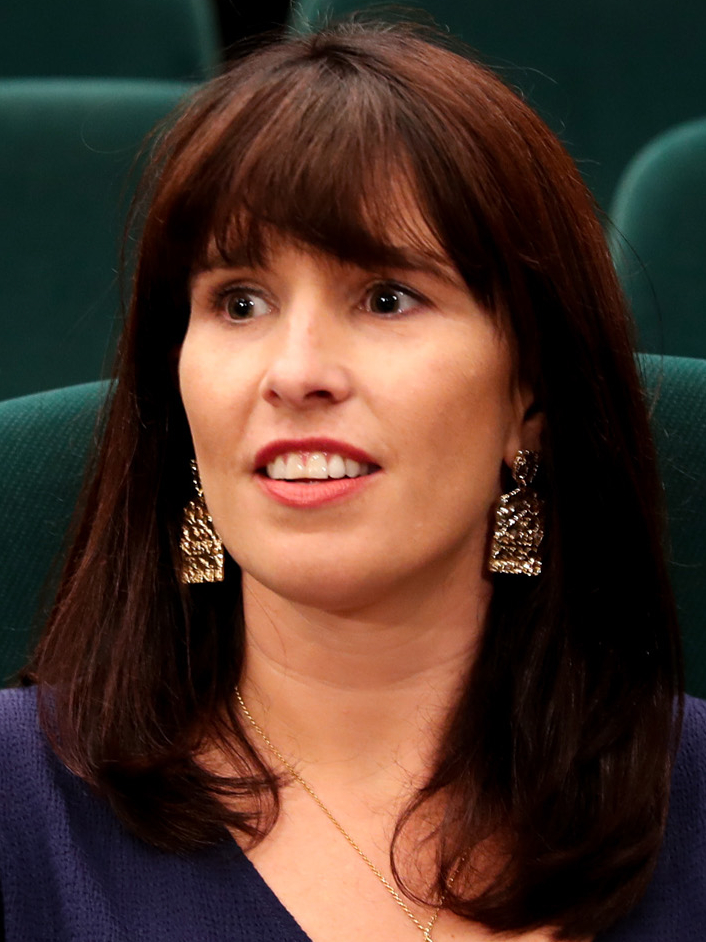
- Moynihan in 2020

Senator
- In office 29 June 2020 – 31 January 2025
- Constituency: Administrative Panel

Leader of the Labour Party in the Seanad
- In office September 2021 – 31 January 2025
- Leader: Alan Kelly; Ivana Bacik
- Preceded by: Ivana Bacik

Personal details
- Born: 11 December 1981 (age 44) Rialto, Dublin, Ireland
- Party: Labour Party
- Children: 1
- Website: rebeccamoynihan.ie

Rebecca Moynihan (born 11 December 1981) is an Irish Labour Party politician who served as a Senator for the Administrative Panel from April 2020 to January 2025.

She was the party's spokesperson on Housing, Local Government, and Heritage. She previously served as a member of Dublin City Council from 2009 to 2020, representing Crumlin-Kimmage and the South West Inner City.

== Early life ==
Moynihan is from a working-class family in Rialto, Dublin.

== Political career ==
Moynihan became involved in the Labour Party at a young age; she was the National Chair of Labour Youth from 2002 to 2004 and is involved in Labour Women.

In 2009, she was elected as a member of Dublin City Council. While a councillor, Moynihan had a motion passed to ensure free period products were available in all Dublin City Council buildings, and secured 100,000 euros in funding for this project. She was elected unopposed as Deputy Lord Mayor of Dublin in 2016 to Lord Mayor Brendan Carr.

Moynihan contested the 2020 general election in the Dublin South-Central constituency, but was unsuccessful, getting 2,095 (4.8%) first preference votes.

At the 2020 Seanad election, she was elected to Seanad Éireann on the Administrative Panel. Darragh Moriarty was co-opted to her seat on Dublin City Council following her election to the Seanad.

As the party's spokesperson on housing, Moynihan has opposed co-living proposals put forward by the government, stating that it is "not suitable" and "even more unsuitable in the context of the Covid crisis".

In January 2021, Moynihan tabled the Period Products (Free Provisions) Bill, which would provide for free tampons, sanitary pads and reusable products in all school bathrooms, educational institutions and public buildings in Ireland.

She did not contest the 2025 Seanad election.

== Personal life ==
Prior to becoming a senator, Moynihan taught at Rathmines College of Further Education.
