= Anna Hedh =

Swedish politician (born 1967)

Anna Hedh MEP
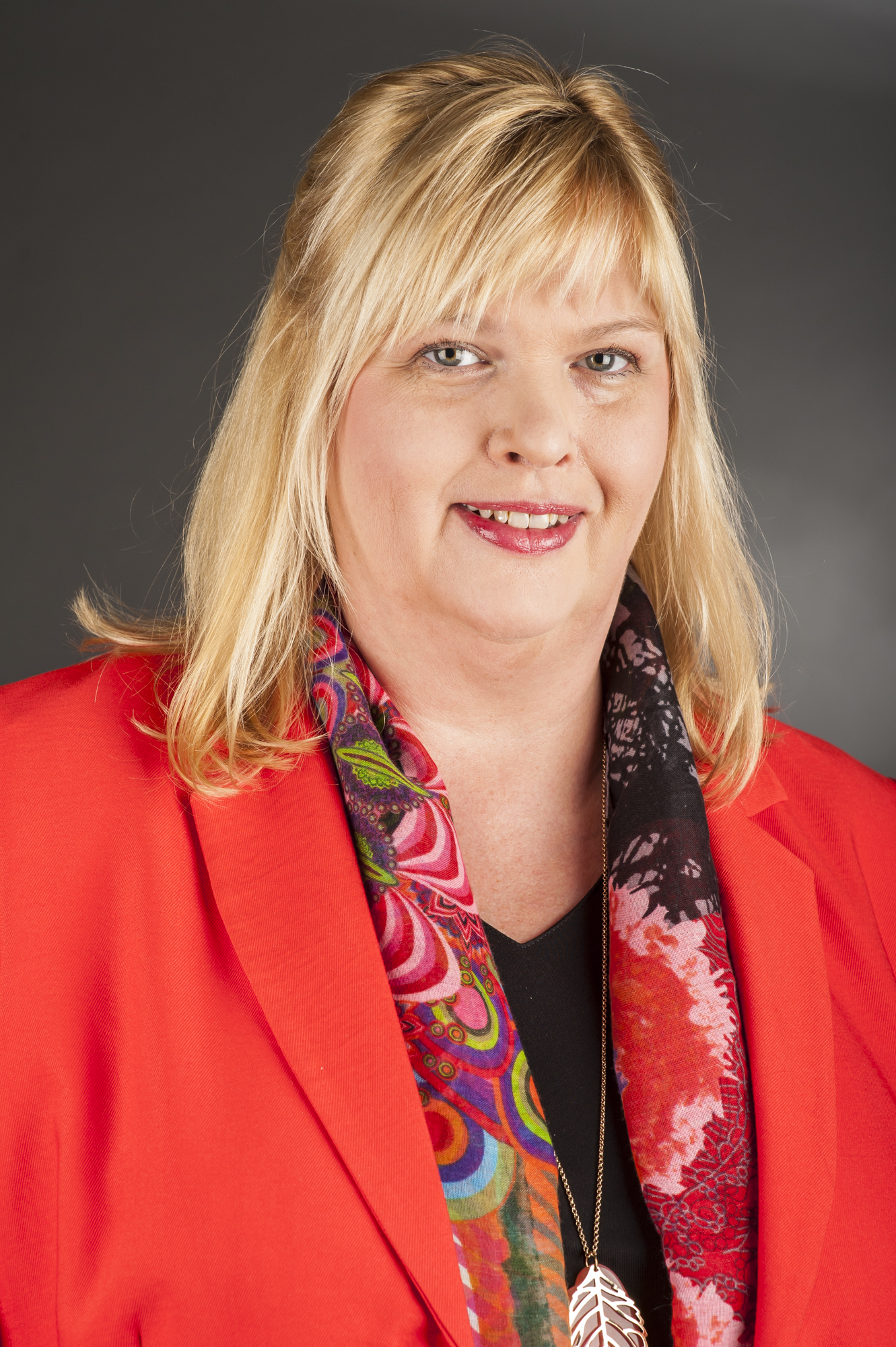

Member of the European Parliament
- In office 2004–2019
- Constituency: Sweden

Personal details
- Born: 18 March 1967 (age 59) Uppsala, Sweden
- Party: Swedish; Social Democratic Party; EU; Progressive Alliance of Socialists and Democrats
- Education: Uppsala University

Video (Swedish)

Anna Lööf Hedh (born 18 March 1967) is a Swedish politician who served as a Member of the European Parliament (MEP) from 2004 until 2019. She is a member of the Swedish Social Democratic Party, part of the Progressive Alliance of Socialists and Democrats.

Hedh served on the European Parliament's Committee on the Internal Market and Consumer Protection. She was also a substitute for the Committee on Women's Rights and Gender Equality, and a delegation member for relations with the Palestinian Legislative Council. In addition to her committee assignments, she served as a member of the European Parliament Intergroup on Western Sahara; the European Parliament Intergroup on LGBT Rights; and the European Parliament Intergroup on Children's Rights.

== Career ==
- Two-year social studies programme at Hvitfeldtska gymnasiet upper secondary school (1983–1985)
- Nursing course, health care administration in Gothenburg (1986)
- Four semesters university studies, youth recreation leader (1987–1989)
- Coordinator, association of local authorities, social services (1998)
- Care assistant (since 1986)
- Children's nurse (1987)
- Catering assistant (1987–1989)
- Youth hostel receptionist (1988)
- Receptionist at driving school (1989–1991)
- Youth recreation leader (1989–1991)
- Manager of youth recreation centre (1992–1997)
- Recreational assistant (1997–1999)
- Treatment assistant (1993–1995)
- Policy advisor, Kalmar (1999–2002)
- Chairwoman of Södra Öland branch of the Social Democratic Party (1999-200?)
- Member of the district executive of the Social Democratic party, Kalmar county (2000- 200?)
- Substitute member of the municipal executive board (1999)
- Member of the committee on cultural affairs and recreation (1999–2002)
- Member of Mörbylånga Council (1999–2002)
- Vice-Chairwoman of the municipal executive board, opposition councillor (2003–2004)
- Vice-Chairwoman of the Öland association of local authorities (2003–2004)
- Member of the Social Democratic Party national executive (2000–200?)
- Chairwoman of Social democratic women in Gävle kommun (2025 - )
