= Janet Camilo =

Former minister of women's affair of the Dominican republic

Minister of Women's Affairs of the Dominican Republic
- In office August 16, 2016 – August 16, 2020
- President: Danilo Medina
- Preceded by: Alejandrina Germán
- Succeeded by: Mayra Jiménez

Personal details
- Born: Janet Altagracia Camilo Hernández; October 29, 1971 (age 54) Salcedo, Dominican Republic
- Education: Universidad Autónoma de Santo Domingo
- Occupation: Lawyer

Janet Altagracia Camilo Hernández (born October 29, 1971) was the Minister of Women's Affairs of the Dominican Republic. She was appointed by President Danilo Medina in August 2016. She is a feminist activist concerned with women's rights.

== Biography ==
Camilo Hernández was born in Salcedo, the daughter of Antonio Manuel de Jesús Camilo and Lorenza Hernández Ramírez. She has seven siblings, a daughter, and a son. She graduated with a licentiate in law from the Universidad Nacional Pedro Henríquez Ureña, and later earned a master's degree in political science from the Universidad Autónoma de Santo Domingo.

In 1991 she joined the National Commitment movement to support José Francisco Peña Gómez of the Dominican Revolutionary Party. She held various positions within that movement.

Camilo Hernández is the President of the Latin American Institute for Women and Politics. She is a vice president of the Permanent Conference of Political Parties of Latin America and the Caribbean (COPPPAL Women). She is also vice president of Socialist International Women.

She was appointed Minister of Women's Affairs by President Danilo Medina on August 16, 2016. On February 1, 2018, she was named president pro tempore of the Council of Women's Ministers of Central America and the Dominican Republic (COMMCA).
