= Maria Dolors Renau =

Spanish politician (1936–2019)

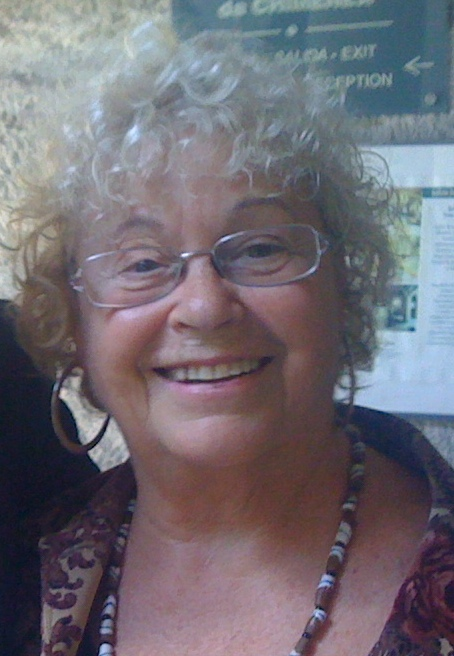
Maria Dolors Renau, 2009

Maria Dolors Renau i Manén (15 November 1936 – 29 August 2019) was a Spanish politician who served as a Deputy and an MEP, as well as president of Socialist International Women (1999–2003).

Renau died in Sant Cugat del Vallès on 29 August 2019 at the age of 82.
