= Michael O'Leary (politician) =

Irish politician (1936–2006)

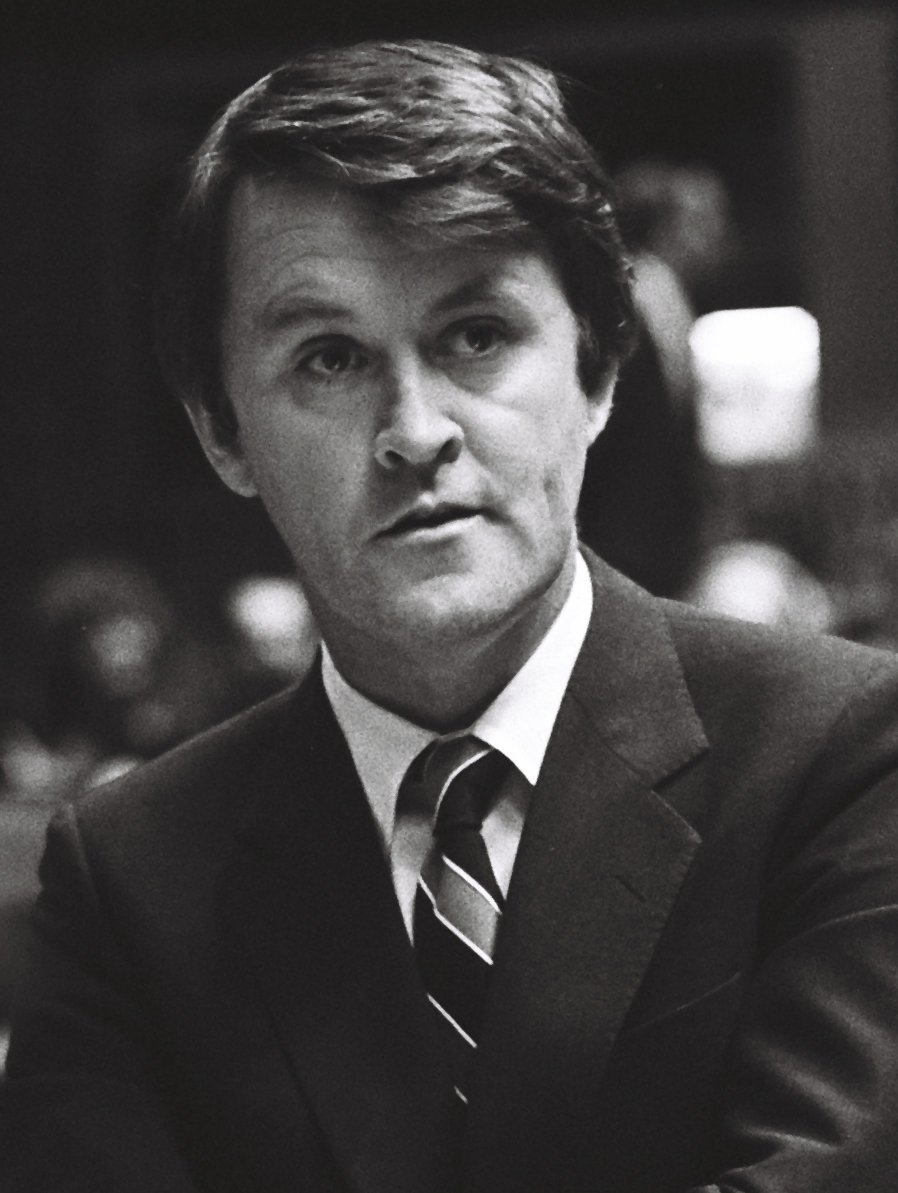
- O'Leary in 1979

Judge of the District Court
- In office 20 March 1997 – 1 May 2006
- Nominated by: Government of Ireland
- Appointed by: Mary Robinson

Tánaiste
- In office 30 June 1981 – 9 March 1982
- Taoiseach: Garret FitzGerald
- Preceded by: George Colley
- Succeeded by: Ray MacSharry

Leader of the Labour Party
- In office 17 June 1981 – 1 November 1982
- Preceded by: Frank Cluskey
- Succeeded by: Dick Spring

Minister for Energy
- In office 30 June 1981 – 9 March 1982
- Taoiseach: Garret FitzGerald
- Preceded by: George Colley
- Succeeded by: Albert Reynolds

Minister for Labour
- In office 14 March 1973 – 5 July 1977
- Taoiseach: Liam Cosgrave
- Preceded by: Joseph Brennan
- Succeeded by: Gene Fitzgerald

Teachta Dála
- In office November 1982 – February 1987
- Constituency: Dublin South-West
- In office June 1981 – November 1982
- Constituency: Dublin Central
- In office April 1965 – June 1981
- Constituency: Dublin North-Central

Member of the European Parliament
- In office 1 July 1979 – 1 July 1981
- Constituency: Dublin

Personal details
- Born: 8 May 1936 Cork, Ireland
- Died: 11 May 2006 (aged 70) Saint-Sever-de-Rustan, France
- Resting place: Saint-Sever Abbey, Landes, France
- Party: Fine Gael
- Other political affiliations: Labour Party (until 1982)
- Spouse: Mary O'Leary (m. 1965)
- Children: 3
- Education: University College Cork; Columbia University; King's Inns

Michael O'Leary (8 May 1936 – 11 May 2006) was an Irish judge, politician and barrister who served as a Judge of the District Court from 1997 to 2006, Tánaiste and Minister for Energy from 1981 to 1982, Leader of the Labour Party from 1981 to 1982 and Minister for Labour from 1973 to 1977. He served as a Teachta Dála (TD) from 1965 to 1987. He was a Member of the European Parliament (MEP) from 1979 to 1981.

He resigned from the Labour Party in 1982 to join Fine Gael.

== Early life ==
O'Leary was born in Cork in 1936, the son of a publican. He was educated at Presentation College, University College Cork, Columbia University, and King's Inns. On returning to Ireland, he became involved in the Labour Party and was employed as an Education Officer for the Irish Transport and General Workers' Union (ITGWU). In this role he was instrumental in establishing the Universities Branch, affiliated to Dublin North-Central constituency, bringing together Labour Party students of the Dublin University Fabian Society in Trinity College Dublin and of University College Dublin.

== Political career ==
O'Leary was first elected to Dáil Éireann as a Labour Party TD for Dublin North-Central at the 1965 general election. His agent was Bob Mitchell, Chairman of Dublin University Fabian Society, who could claim credit in a dirty campaign for picking up transfers to squeeze out the Labour Party front-runner on the 11th recount.

When he was first elected to the Dáil, O'Leary encouraged the Labour Party to take a more left-wing stance in its policies. He was initially strongly opposed to the idea of a coalition with Fine Gael, but following the 1969 general election he believed that there was a need for a new approach. When the Labour Party and Fine Gael formed the National Coalition government following the 1973 general election he was appointed Minister for Labour.

In 1977, he was narrowly defeated by Frank Cluskey for the leadership of the party. O'Leary was elected to the European Parliament for the Dublin constituency in 1979.

Cluskey resigned as Labour Party leader when he lost his Dáil seat at the 1981 general election and O'Leary was elected unanimously to succeed him. In the short-lived Fine Gael–Labour Party government of 1981 to 1982, O'Leary became Tánaiste and Minister for Energy. After the government's defeat at the February 1982 general election he remained leader until he suddenly resigned both the leadership and his party membership on 28 October, in the aftermath of a party conference vote on a potential coalition with Fine Gael. On 3 November he joined Fine Gael. At the November 1982 general election, he was elected a Fine Gael TD in the Dublin South-West constituency. After the election, a new Fine Gael–Labour government was formed, but O'Leary was kept out of cabinet office by his former Labour colleagues.

In 1985, O'Leary introduced a private member's bill on divorce which preceded the government's own 1986 divorce referendum.

When the Progressive Democrats were formed in 1985 he considered joining but remained with Fine Gael.

He did not contest the 1987 general election and afterwards, he moved back to Cork and practised as a barrister. He was elected as a Fine Gael member of Cork City Council at the 1991 local elections. He unsuccessfully contested the 1992 general election in Cork North-Central and received about 2% of the valid poll.

He was appointed a District Court judge in 1997 by the Fine Gael–Labour Party–Democratic Left coalition government.

== Death ==
O'Leary died in France in May 2006, following a drowning accident in a swimming pool. He was on holiday, having retired as a judge just days earlier.

Political offices
Preceded by Joseph Brennan	Minister for Labour; 1973–1977	Succeeded by Gene Fitzgerald
Preceded by George Colley	Tánaiste; 1981–1982	Succeeded by Ray MacSharry
Preceded by George Colley	Minister for Energy; 1981–1982	Succeeded by Albert Reynolds
Party political offices
Preceded by Frank Cluskey	Leader of the Labour Party; 1981–1982	Succeeded by Dick Spring

Dáil	Election	Deputy (Party)	Deputy (Party)	Deputy (Party)	Deputy (Party)
13th	1948	Vivion de Valera (FF)	Martin O'Sullivan (Lab)	Patrick McGilligan (FG)	3 seats 1948–1961
14th	1951	Vivion de Valera (FF)	Colm Gallagher (FF)	Patrick McGilligan (FG)	3 seats 1948–1961
15th	1954	Vivion de Valera (FF)	Maureen O'Carroll (Lab)	Patrick McGilligan (FG)	3 seats 1948–1961
16th	1957	Vivion de Valera (FF)	Colm Gallagher (FF)	Patrick McGilligan (FG)	3 seats 1948–1961
16th	1957 by-election	Vivion de Valera (FF)	Frank Sherwin (Ind.)	Patrick McGilligan (FG)	3 seats 1948–1961
17th	1961	Vivion de Valera (FF)	Frank Sherwin (Ind.)	Patrick McGilligan (FG)	Celia Lynch (FF)
18th	1965	Vivion de Valera (FF)	Michael O'Leary (Lab)	Luke Belton (FG)	Celia Lynch (FF)
19th	1969	George Colley (FF)	Michael O'Leary (Lab)	Luke Belton (FG)	Celia Lynch (FF)
20th	1973	George Colley (FF)	Michael O'Leary (Lab)	Luke Belton (FG)	Celia Lynch (FF)
21st	1977	Vincent Brady (FF)	Michael O'Leary (Lab)	Michael Keating (FG)	3 seats 1977–1981
22nd	1981	Vincent Brady (FF)	Charles Haughey (FF)	Noël Browne (SLP)	George Birmingham (FG)
23rd	1982 (Feb)	Vincent Brady (FF)	Charles Haughey (FF)	Richard Bruton (FG)	George Birmingham (FG)
24th	1982 (Nov)	Vincent Brady (FF)	Charles Haughey (FF)	Richard Bruton (FG)	George Birmingham (FG)
25th	1987	Vincent Brady (FF)	Charles Haughey (FF)	Richard Bruton (FG)	George Birmingham (FG)
26th	1989	Vincent Brady (FF)	Charles Haughey (FF)	Richard Bruton (FG)	Ivor Callely (FF)
27th	1992	Seán Haughey (FF)	Derek McDowell (Lab)	Richard Bruton (FG)	Ivor Callely (FF)
28th	1997	Seán Haughey (FF)	Derek McDowell (Lab)	Richard Bruton (FG)	Ivor Callely (FF)
29th	2002	Seán Haughey (FF)	Finian McGrath (Ind.)	Richard Bruton (FG)	Ivor Callely (FF)
30th	2007	Seán Haughey (FF)	Finian McGrath (Ind.)	Richard Bruton (FG)	3 seats from 2007
31st	2011	Aodhán Ó Ríordáin (Lab)	Finian McGrath (Ind.)	Richard Bruton (FG)	3 seats from 2007
32nd	2016	Constituency abolished. See Dublin Bay North			

Dáil	Election	Deputy (Party)	Deputy (Party)	Deputy (Party)	Deputy (Party)
19th	1969	Frank Cluskey (Lab)	Vivion de Valera (FF)	Thomas J. Fitzpatrick (FF)	Maurice E. Dockrell (FG)
20th	1973	Frank Cluskey (Lab)	Vivion de Valera (FF)	Thomas J. Fitzpatrick (FF)	Maurice E. Dockrell (FG)
21st	1977	Constituency abolished			

Dáil	Election	Deputy (Party)	Deputy (Party)	Deputy (Party)	Deputy (Party)	Deputy (Party)
22nd	1981	Bertie Ahern (FF)	Michael Keating (FG)	Alice Glenn (FG)	Michael O'Leary (Lab)	George Colley (FF)
23rd	1982 (Feb)	Bertie Ahern (FF)	Michael Keating (FG)	Tony Gregory (Ind.)	Michael O'Leary (Lab)	George Colley (FF)
24th	1982 (Nov)	Bertie Ahern (FF)	Michael Keating (FG)	Tony Gregory (Ind.)	Alice Glenn (FG)	George Colley (FF)
24th	1983 by-election	Bertie Ahern (FF)	Michael Keating (FG)	Tony Gregory (Ind.)	Alice Glenn (FG)	Tom Leonard (FF)
25th	1987	Bertie Ahern (FF)	Michael Keating (PDs)	Tony Gregory (Ind.)	Dermot Fitzpatrick (FF)	John Stafford (FF)
26th	1989	Bertie Ahern (FF)	Pat Lee (FG)	Tony Gregory (Ind.)	Dermot Fitzpatrick (FF)	John Stafford (FF)
27th	1992	Bertie Ahern (FF)	Jim Mitchell (FG)	Tony Gregory (Ind.)	Joe Costello (Lab)	4 seats 1992–2016
28th	1997	Bertie Ahern (FF)	Jim Mitchell (FG)	Tony Gregory (Ind.)	Marian McGennis (FF)	4 seats 1992–2016
29th	2002	Bertie Ahern (FF)	Dermot Fitzpatrick (FF)	Tony Gregory (Ind.)	Joe Costello (Lab)	4 seats 1992–2016
30th	2007	Bertie Ahern (FF)	Cyprian Brady (FF)	Tony Gregory (Ind.)	Joe Costello (Lab)	4 seats 1992–2016
30th	2009 by-election	Bertie Ahern (FF)	Cyprian Brady (FF)	Maureen O'Sullivan (Ind.)	Joe Costello (Lab)	4 seats 1992–2016
31st	2011	Mary Lou McDonald (SF)	Paschal Donohoe (FG)	Maureen O'Sullivan (Ind.)	Joe Costello (Lab)	4 seats 1992–2016
32nd	2016	Mary Lou McDonald (SF)	Paschal Donohoe (FG)	Maureen O'Sullivan (Ind.)	3 seats 2016–2020	
33rd	2020	Mary Lou McDonald (SF)	Paschal Donohoe (FG)	Gary Gannon (SD)	Neasa Hourigan (GP)	4 seats from 2020
34th	2024	Mary Lou McDonald (SF)	Paschal Donohoe (FG)	Gary Gannon (SD)	Marie Sherlock (Lab)	4 seats from 2020
34th	2026 by-election	Mary Lou McDonald (SF)	Daniel Ennis (SD)	Gary Gannon (SD)	Marie Sherlock (Lab)	4 seats from 2020

Dáil	Election	Deputy (Party)	Deputy (Party)	Deputy (Party)	Deputy (Party)	Deputy (Party)
13th	1948	Seán MacBride (CnaP)	Peadar Doyle (FG)	Bernard Butler (FF)	Michael O'Higgins (FG)	Robert Briscoe (FF)
14th	1951	Seán MacBride (CnaP)	Peadar Doyle (FG)	Bernard Butler (FF)	Michael ffrench-O'Carroll (Ind.)	Robert Briscoe (FF)
15th	1954	Seán MacBride (CnaP)	Peadar Doyle (FG)	Bernard Butler (FF)	Michael O'Higgins (FG)	Robert Briscoe (FF)
15th	1956 by-election	Seán MacBride (CnaP)	Noel Lemass (FF)	Bernard Butler (FF)	Michael O'Higgins (FG)	Robert Briscoe (FF)
16th	1957	James Carroll (Ind.)	Noel Lemass (FF)	Bernard Butler (FF)	Michael O'Higgins (FG)	Robert Briscoe (FF)
16th	1959 by-election	James Carroll (Ind.)	Noel Lemass (FF)	Richie Ryan (FG)	Michael O'Higgins (FG)	Robert Briscoe (FF)
17th	1961	James Carroll (Ind.)	Noel Lemass (FF)	Richie Ryan (FG)	James O'Keeffe (FG)	Robert Briscoe (FF)
18th	1965	John O'Connell (Lab)	Noel Lemass (FF)	Richie Ryan (FG)	Joseph Dowling (FF)	Ben Briscoe (FF)
19th	1969	John O'Connell (Lab)	Noel Lemass (FF)	Seán Dunne (Lab)	Joseph Dowling (FF)	4 seats 1969–1977
19th	1970 by-election	John O'Connell (Lab)	Noel Lemass (FF)	Seán Sherwin (FF)	Joseph Dowling (FF)	4 seats 1969–1977
20th	1973	John O'Connell (Lab)	Noel Lemass (FF)	Declan Costello (FG)	Joseph Dowling (FF)	4 seats 1969–1977
20th	1976 by-election	John O'Connell (Lab)	Brendan Halligan (Lab)	Declan Costello (FG)	Joseph Dowling (FF)	4 seats 1969–1977
21st	1977	Constituency abolished. See Dublin Ballyfermot				

Dáil	Election	Deputy (Party)	Deputy (Party)	Deputy (Party)	Deputy (Party)	Deputy (Party)
22nd	1981	Seán Walsh (FF)	Larry McMahon (FG)	Mary Harney (FF)	Mervyn Taylor (Lab)	4 seats 1981–1992
23rd	1982 (Feb)	Seán Walsh (FF)	Larry McMahon (FG)	Mary Harney (FF)	Mervyn Taylor (Lab)	4 seats 1981–1992
24th	1982 (Nov)	Seán Walsh (FF)	Michael O'Leary (FG)	Mary Harney (FF)	Mervyn Taylor (Lab)	4 seats 1981–1992
25th	1987	Seán Walsh (FF)	Chris Flood (FF)	Mary Harney (PDs)	Mervyn Taylor (Lab)	4 seats 1981–1992
26th	1989	Pat Rabbitte (WP)	Chris Flood (FF)	Mary Harney (PDs)	Mervyn Taylor (Lab)	4 seats 1981–1992
27th	1992	Pat Rabbitte (DL)	Chris Flood (FF)	Mary Harney (PDs)	Mervyn Taylor (Lab)	Éamonn Walsh (Lab)
28th	1997	Pat Rabbitte (DL)	Chris Flood (FF)	Mary Harney (PDs)	Conor Lenihan (FF)	Brian Hayes (FG)
29th	2002	Pat Rabbitte (Lab)	Charlie O'Connor (FF)	Seán Crowe (SF)	Conor Lenihan (FF)	4 seats 2002–2016
30th	2007	Pat Rabbitte (Lab)	Charlie O'Connor (FF)	Brian Hayes (FG)	Conor Lenihan (FF)	4 seats 2002–2016
31st	2011	Pat Rabbitte (Lab)	Eamonn Maloney (Lab)	Brian Hayes (FG)	Seán Crowe (SF)	4 seats 2002–2016
31st	2014 by-election	Pat Rabbitte (Lab)	Eamonn Maloney (Lab)	Paul Murphy (AAA)	Seán Crowe (SF)	4 seats 2002–2016
32nd	2016	Colm Brophy (FG)	John Lahart (FF)	Paul Murphy (AAA–PBP)	Seán Crowe (SF)	Katherine Zappone (Ind.)
33rd	2020	Colm Brophy (FG)	John Lahart (FF)	Paul Murphy (S–PBP)	Seán Crowe (SF)	Francis Noel Duffy (GP)
34th	2024	Colm Brophy (FG)	John Lahart (FF)	Paul Murphy (PBP–S)	Seán Crowe (SF)	Ciarán Ahern (Lab)
