= Labour Party (Ireland) =

Political party

Labour Party Páirtí an Lucht Oibre
- Leader: Ivana Bacik
- Seanad leader: Vacant
- Parliamentary Party Chairperson: Ged Nash
- Chairperson: Lisa Connell
- General Secretary: Billie Sparks
- Founders: James Connolly; James Larkin; William O'Brien
- Founded: 28 May 1912; 114 years ago
- Headquarters: 2 Whitefriars, Aungier Street, Dublin
- Youth wing: Labour Youth
- Women's wing: Labour Women
- LGBT wing: Labour LGBT
- Membership (2020): ~3,000
- Ideology: Social democracy; Pro-Europeanism
- Political position: Centre-left
- European affiliation: Party of European Socialists
- European Parliament group: Progressive Alliance of Socialists and Democrats
- International affiliation: Progressive Alliance; Socialist International
- Colours: Red
- Anthem: "The Red Flag"
- Dáil Éireann: 11 / 174
- Seanad Éireann: 2 / 60
- Local government: 57 / 949
- European Parliament: 1 / 14

Website
- labour.ie

The Labour Party (Irish: Páirtí an Lucht Oibre, lit. 'Party of the Working People') is a centre-left and social democratic political party in the Republic of Ireland. It was founded on 28 May 1912 in Clonmel, County Tipperary, by James Connolly, James Larkin, and William O'Brien as the political wing of the Irish Trades Union Congress.

Labour continues to be the political arm of the Irish trade union and labour movement and seeks to represent workers' interests in the Dáil and on a local level. Unlike many other Irish political parties, Labour did not arise as a faction of the original Sinn Féin party, although it merged with the Democratic Left in 1999, a party that traced its origins back to Sinn Féin. The party has served as a partner in coalition governments on eight occasions since its formation: seven times in coalition either with Fine Gael alone or with Fine Gael and other smaller parties, and once with Fianna Fáil. This gives Labour a cumulative total of twenty-five years served as part of a government, the third-longest total of any party in the Republic of Ireland after Fianna Fáil and Fine Gael.

Led by Ivana Bacik, it is the fifth-largest party in Dáil Éireann, with eleven seats, and is the fourth-largest party in Seanad Éireann, with two seats, making Labour the fourth-largest party in the Oireachtas overall as of 2025. It currently has 1 MEP. Current president of Ireland Catherine Connolly and former presidents Michael D. Higgins and Mary Robinson were members of the Labour Party at one point prior to becoming president. The Labour Party is a member of the Progressive Alliance, Socialist International, and Party of European Socialists.

== History ==
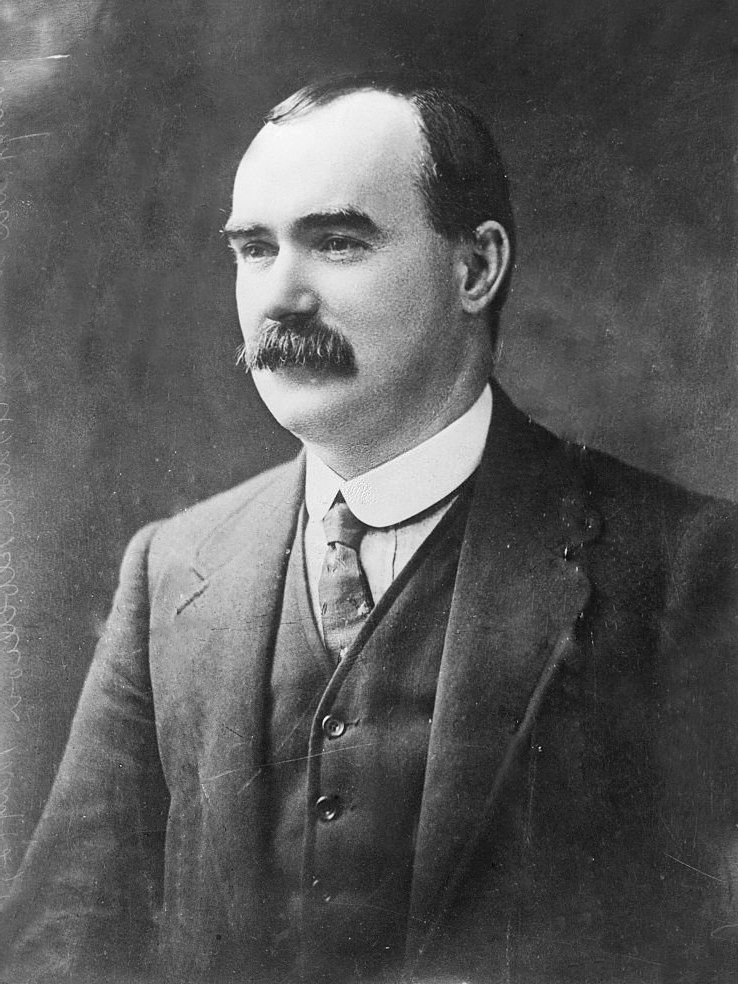
James Connolly

James "Jim" Larkin

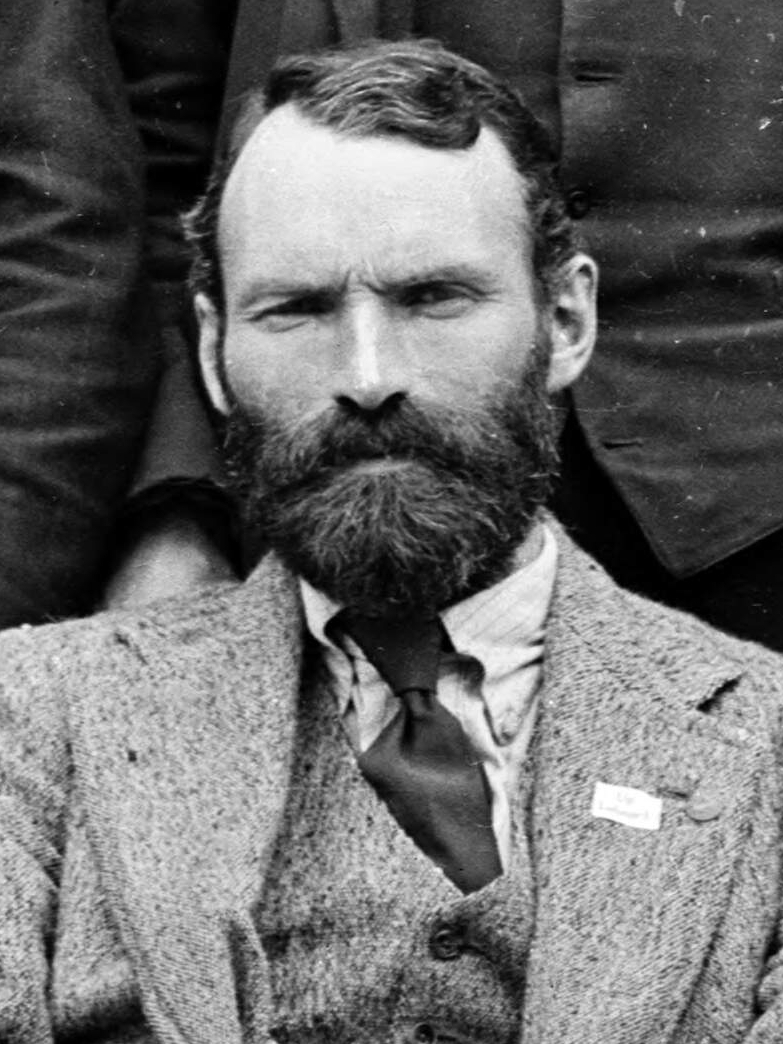
William O'Brien

Connolly, Larkin and O'Brien founded the party in 1912.

=== Foundation ===
James Connolly, James Larkin and William O'Brien established the Irish Labour Party on 28 May 1912, as the political wing of the Irish Trades Union Congress, in Clonmel Town Hall. This party was to represent the workers in the expected Dublin Parliament under the Third Home Rule Act 1914. However, after the defeat of the trade unions in the Dublin Lockout of 1913 the labour movement was weakened; the emigration of James Larkin in 1914 and the execution of James Connolly following the Easter Rising in 1916 further damaged it.

The Irish Citizen Army (ICA), formed during the 1913 Lockout, was informally the military wing of the Labour Movement. The ICA took part in the 1916 Rising. Councillor Richard O'Carroll, a Labour Party member of Dublin Corporation, was the only serving elected representative to be killed during the Easter Rising. O'Carroll was shot by John Bowen-Colthurst and died several days later, on 5 May 1916. The ICA was revived during Peadar O'Donnell's Republican Congress but after the 1935 split in the Congress most ICA members joined the Labour Party.

=== Early history ===
In Larkin's absence, William O'Brien became the dominant figure in the Irish Transport and General Workers' Union (ITGWU) and wielded considerable influence in the Labour Party. O'Brien also dominated the Irish Trades Union Congress. The Labour Party, led by Thomas Johnson from 1917, declined to contest the 1918 general election in order to allow the election to take the form of a plebiscite on Ireland's constitutional status (although some candidates did run in Belfast constituencies under the Labour banner against Unionist candidates). It also refrained from contesting the 1921 elections. As a result, the party was left outside Dáil Éireann during the vital years of the independence struggle.

=== In the Irish Free State ===
The Anglo-Irish Treaty divided the Labour Party. Some members sided with the Irregulars in the Irish Civil War that quickly followed, however O'Brien and Johnson encouraged its members to support the Treaty. In the 1922 general election the party won 17 seats, having fielded 18 candidates. Winning 21.4% of the first preference vote, this remains the party's highest ever share of the vote as of 2022. However, there were a number of strikes during the first year and a loss in support for the party. In the 1923 general election the Labour Party only won 14 seats. From 1922 until Fianna Fáil TDs took their seats in 1927, the Labour Party was the major opposition party in the Dáil. Labour attacked the lack of social reform by the Cumann na nGaedheal government. From 1927, a large number of the Labour Party's voters were pre-empted by Fianna Fáil, with its almost identical policies. Labour lacked Fianna Fáil's 'republican' image, which was a contributing factor to this loss.

Larkin returned to Ireland in April 1923. He hoped to resume the leadership role in the ITGWU which he had previously left, but O'Brien resisted him. Larkin also created a pro-communist party called the Irish Worker League. O'Brien regarded Larkin as a "loose cannon." Following a failed challenge to O'Brien's leadership and association with communist militancy, Larkin was expelled from the ITGWU and created the WUI, a communist alternative to the ITGWU, in 1924. Two-thirds of the Dublin membership of the ITGWU defected to the new union. O'Brien blocked the WUI from admission to the ITUC. Larkin was elected to Dáil Éireann at the September 1927 general election. However, the Labour Party prevented him from taking his seat as an undischarged bankrupt for losing a libel case against Labour leader Tom Johnson.

In 1932, the Labour Party supported Éamon de Valera's first Fianna Fáil government, which had proposed a programme of social reform with which the party was in sympathy. In the 1943 general election the party won 17 seats, its best result since 1927.

The Irish Labour Party and the Irish Trades Union Congress separated in 1930. Future leader William Norton was prominent in urging the separation of the political and industrial wings of the labour movement into autonomous organisations, arguing that the move was necessary to broaden the party's electoral appeal beyond a trade union constituency.

The party was socially conservative compared to similar European parties, and its leaders from 1932 to 1977 (William Norton and his successor Brendan Corish) were members of the Catholic fraternal organisation the Knights of Saint Columbanus. The early to mid-20th century marked constant battles within Labour about whether to appease the Catholic Church or to take on a more militant labour approach.

=== Split with National Labour and the first coalition governments ===
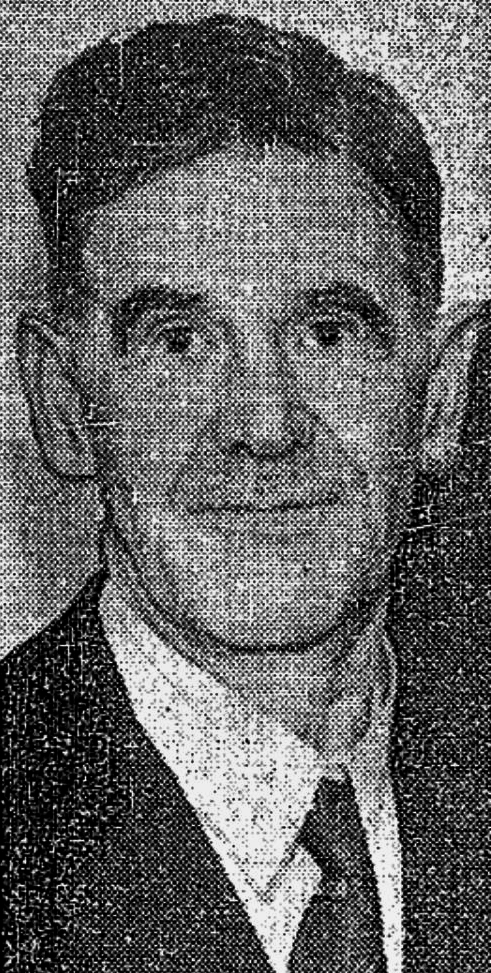
In 1944 James Everett led a faction out of Labour and into a short-lived anti-communist splinter party until they reunited in 1950

Despite efforts in the 1930s to sternly downplay the idea of Communist influence over the party, by the 1940s internal conflict and complementary allegations of communist infiltration caused a split in the Labour Party and the Irish Congress of Trade Unions. Tensions peaked in 1941 when party founder Jim Larkin and a number of his supporters were re-admitted to the party and subsequently accused of "taking over" Labour branches in Dublin. In response William X. O'Brien left with six TDs in 1944, founding the National Labour Party, whose leader was James Everett. O'Brien also withdrew the ITGWU from the Irish Trades Unions Congress and set up his own congress. The split damaged the Labour movement in the 1944 general election. The ITGWU attacked "Larkinite and Communist Party elements" which it claimed had taken over the Labour Party. The split and the anti-communist assault put Labour on the defensive. It launched its own inquiry into communist involvement, which resulted in the expulsion of six members. Alfred O'Rahilly in The Communist Front and the Attack on Irish Labour widened the assault to include the influence of British-based unions and communists in the ITUC. The National Labour Party juxtaposed itself against this by emphasising its commitment to Catholic Social Teaching. However, Labour also continued to emphasise its anti-communist credentials. Only after Larkin's death in 1947 could an attempt at unity be made.

After the 1948 general election National Labour had five TDs – Everett, Dan Spring, James Pattison, James Hickey and John O'Leary. National Labour and Labour (with 14 TDs) both entered the First Inter-Party Government, with the leader of National Labour becoming Minister for Posts and Telegraphs. In 1950, the National Labour TDs rejoined the Labour Party.

From 1948 to 1951 and from 1954 to 1957, the Labour Party was the second-largest partner in the two inter-party governments (the largest being Fine Gael). William Norton, the Labour Party leader, became Tánaiste on both occasions. During the First Inter-Party Government he served as Minister for Social Welfare, while during the Second Inter-Party Government he served as Minister for Industry and Commerce. (See first inter-party government and second inter-party government.)

=== Re-establishment in Northern Ireland ===
The Republic of Ireland Act 1948 and Ireland Act 1949 precipitated a split in the Northern Ireland Labour Party (NILP) with Jack Macgougan leading anti-Partition members out and affiliating branches to the Dublin party, joined by other left-wing and nationalist representatives and branded locally as "Irish Labour". At Westminster, Jack Beattie held Belfast West from 1951 to 1955; the British Labour party refused Beattie its whip. At Stormont, Belfast Dock was won by Murtagh Morgan in 1953 and Paddy Devlin in 1962, but Devlin in 1964 left for the Republican Labour Party and Irish Labour contested no further Westminster or Stormont elections. In the 1949 local elections it won 7 seats on Belfast City Council, 6 (unopposed) on Armagh urban district council (UDC) and one on Dungannon UDC. In Derry, the party collapsed when Stephen McGonagle left after 1952. It was strongest in Warrenpoint and Newry UDCs, winning control of the former in 1949 and the latter in 1958, retaining seats in both until their 1973 abolition. Tommy Markey was expelled from the party in 1964 for taking a salute as Newry council chair from the Irish Guards. Party branches still existed in Warrenpoint and Newry as late as 1982, though candidates were heavily defeated in Newry and Mourne District Council at the 1973 local elections. The Social Democratic and Labour Party founded in 1970 took most of Irish Labour's voters and soon had its formal endorsement.

=== Under Brendan Corish, 1960–1977 ===
The seventies will be socialist. At the next general election Labour must . . . make a major breakthrough in seats and votes. It must demonstrate convincingly that it has the capacity to become the Government of this country. Our present position is a mere transition phase on the road to securing the support of the majority of our people. At the next general election (we) must face the electorate with a clear-cut alternative to the conservatism of the past and present; and emerge . . . . as the Party which will shape the seventies. What I offer now is the outline of a new society, a New Republic.

— Brendan Corish, The 1967 Labour national conference

Brendan Corish became the new Labour leader in 1960. As leader, he advocated for more socialist policies to be adopted by the party; although initially tempering by this describing these policies as "a form of Christian socialism", he would later feel comfortable enough to drop the "Christian" prefix. In contrast to his predecessors, Corish adopted an anti-coalition stance. He attempted to give his fractious, divided party a coherent national identity, lurched it to the left and insisted Labour was the natural party of social justice. In the late 1960s, Labour began to embrace the 'New Left,' and Corish presented his A New Republic document at the 1967 Labour national conference, alongside a famous speech which declared that "The seventies will be socialist", which later became a Labour campaign slogan. Corish's new socialist direction for Labour was generally well-received internally; the membership's faith in Corish had already been bolstered by encouraging election results in 1965 and 1967.

Although Labour's share of the vote improved to 17% in the 1969 Irish general election, the best in 50 years, the party only won 17 seats - 5 fewer than in the 1965 general election. The result dented Corish's confidence and caused him to reconsider his anti-coalition stance.

Labour promoted a Eurosceptic outlook in the 1961 general election, and in 1972, the party campaigned against membership of the European Economic Community (EEC).

Between 1973 and 1977, the Labour Party formed a coalition government with Fine Gael. The coalition partners lost the subsequent 1977 general election, and Corish resigned immediately after the defeat and was succeeded by Frank Cluskey following a leadership contest.

=== Late 1970s and 1980s: Coalition, internal feuding, electoral decline and regrowth ===
In 1977, shortly after the election defeat, members grouped around the Liaison Committee for the Labour Left split from Labour and formed the short-lived Socialist Labour Party. From 1981 to 1982 and from 1982 to 1987, the Labour Party participated in coalition governments with Fine Gael. While serving in coalition Labour was successful in averting steep cuts in social welfare favoured by Fine Gael. Labour ministers also presided over a number of social policy initiatives such as a Family Income Supplement, a child care protection bill, a Maternity Benefit, a social employment scheme, the establishment of a Youth employment agency, and the adoption of an equa treatment directive.

In the later part of the second of these coalition terms, the country's poor economic and fiscal situation required strict curtailing of government spending, and the Labour Party bore much of the blame for unpopular cutbacks in health and other public services. The nadir for the Labour party was the 1987 general election where it received only 6.4% of the vote. Whatever its successes in government, one study opined “voters did not reward them. Instead they were disappointed by Labour's inability to implement more of its own policies (Marsh and Mitchell 1999:49).” Labour's vote was also increasingly threatened by the growth of the Marxist and more radical Workers' Party, particularly in Dublin. Fianna Fáil formed a minority government from 1987 to 1989 and then a coalition with the Progressive Democrats.

The 1980s saw fierce disagreements between the wings of the party. The more radical elements, Labour Left, led by such figures as Emmet Stagg, Sam Nolan, Frank Buckley and Helena Sheehan, and Militant Tendency, led by Joe Higgins, opposed the idea of Labour entering into coalition government with either of the major centre-right parties (Fianna Fáil and Fine Gael). At the 1989 Labour Party conference in Tralee a number of socialist and Trotskyist activists, organised around the Militant Tendency and their internal newspaper, were expelled. Amongst those expelled included future TDs Clare Daly, Ruth Coppinger and Mick Barry as well as Joe Higgins, who went on to found the Socialist Party in 1996.

=== 1990s: Growing political influence and involvement ===
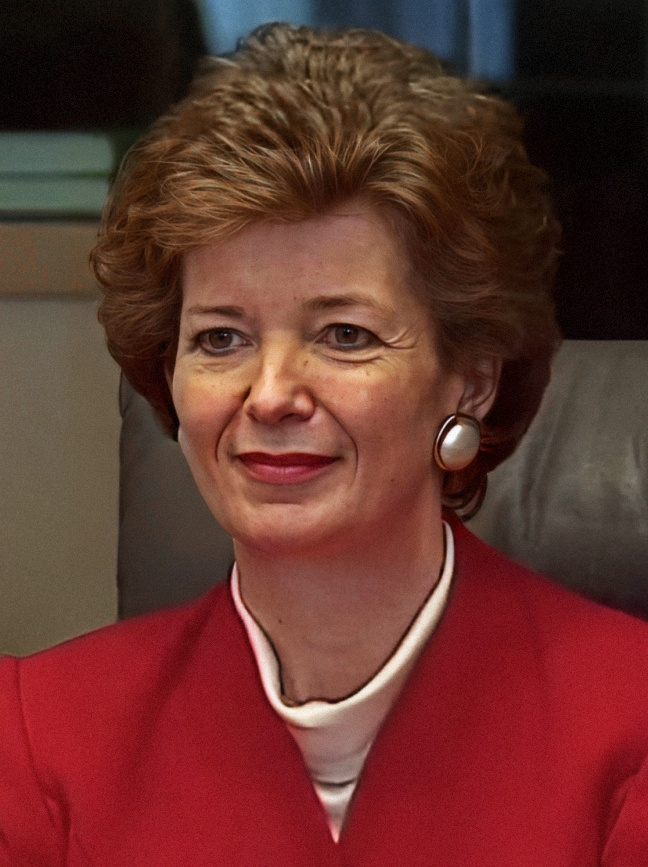
The ascendancy of Mary Robinson to the Presidency of Ireland was heralded as a great victory for the Labour party

The early 1990s saw a sustained period of growth for the Labour Party. In 1990 former Labour Senator Mary Robinson became the first President of Ireland to have been proposed by the Labour Party. Although she had contested the election as an independent candidate, having resigned from the party over her opposition to the Anglo Irish Agreement, her victory was generally considered as reflecting very well on Labour, who had supported her campaign. Not only was it the first time a woman held the office but it was the first time, apart from Douglas Hyde, that a non-Fianna Fáil candidate was elected. It was also in 1990 that Limerick East TD Jim Kemmy's Democratic Socialist Party merged into the Labour Party, and in 1992 Sligo–Leitrim TD Declan Bree's Independent Socialist Party also followed suit and joined the Labour Party.

At the 1992 general election the Labour Party won a record 19.3% of the first preference votes, more than twice its share in the 1989 general election. The party's representation in the Dáil doubled to 33 seats in a momentum swing dubbed by the Irish national media as the "Spring Tide", who attributed much of the surge in the party's popularity to its leader Dick Spring. After a period of negotiations, the Labour Party formed a coalition with Fianna Fáil, taking office in January 1993 as the 23rd government of Ireland. Fianna Fáil leader Albert Reynolds remained as Taoiseach, and Labour Party leader Dick Spring became Tánaiste and Minister for Foreign Affairs.

After less than two years the government fell in a controversy over the appointment of Attorney General, Harry Whelehan, as president of the High Court. The parliamentary arithmetic had changed as a result of Fianna Fáil's loss of two seats in by-elections in June, where the Labour Party itself had performed disastrously. In November, 1994, Albert Reynolds moved to appoint Harry Whelehan as President of the High Court against Labour objections related to the Fr. Brendan Smyth paedophilia case, Dick Spring and Labour cabinet members walked out and the affair brought down the government.

The Labour Party negotiated a new coalition, the first time in Irish political history that one coalition replaced another without a general election. Between 1994 and 1997 Fine Gael, the Labour Party, and Democratic Left governed in the 24th government of Ireland. Dick Spring became Tánaiste and Minister for Foreign Affairs again. Labour greatly influenced the policy document for the 1993-1994 coalition, with one observer noting that Fianna Fáil's policy document for the coalition "contained lots of our policies, While swaths of texts were lifted from our manifesto". (Bowcott 1993)

=== Merger with Democratic Left ===
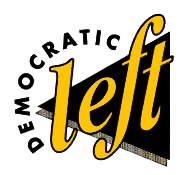
Logo of the Democratic Left

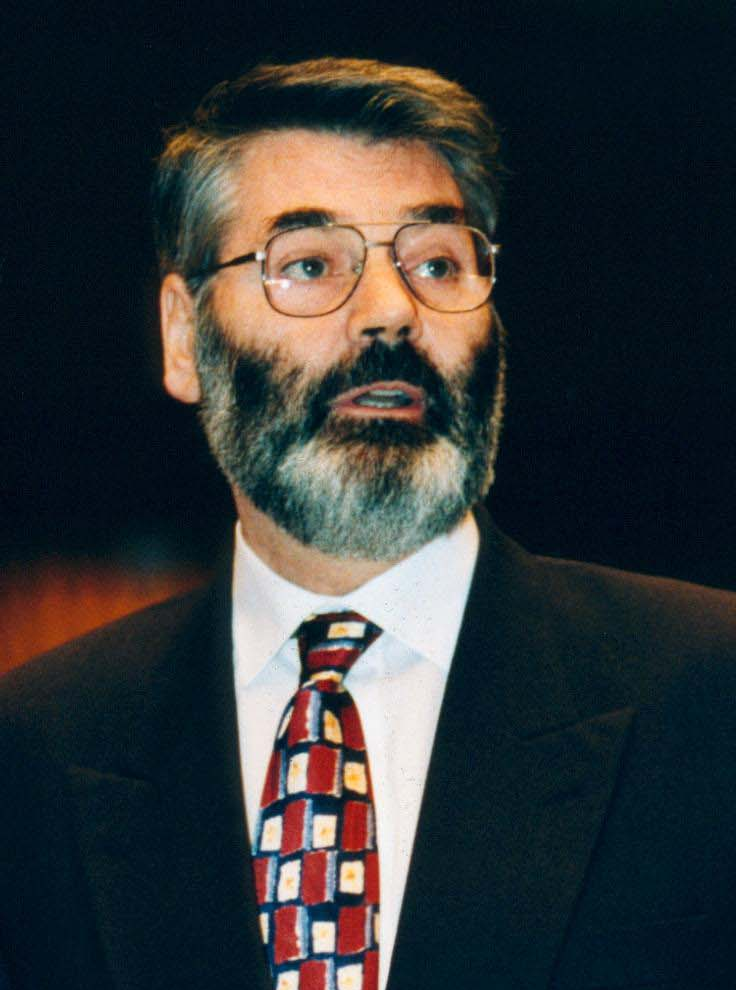
Proinsias De Rossa

Proinsias De Rossa lead his faction out of the Workers' Party and into Democratic Left, and from Democratic Left into Labour.

The Labour Party presented the 1997 general election, held just weeks after spectacular electoral victories for the French Socialist Party and British Labour Party, as the first-ever choice between a government of the left and one of the right; but the party, as had often been the case following its participation in coalitions, lost support and lost half of its TDs. Labour's losses were so severe that while Fine Gael gained seats, it still came up well short of the support it needed to keep Bruton in office. This, combined with a poor showing by Labour Party candidate Adi Roche in the subsequent election for President of Ireland, led to Spring's resignation as party leader.

In 1997 Ruairi Quinn became the new Labour Party leader. Following negotiations in 1999, the Labour Party merged with Democratic Left, keeping the name of the larger partner. This had been previously opposed by the former leader Dick Spring. Members of Democratic Left in Northern Ireland were invited to join the Irish Labour Party but were not permitted to organise.

Quinn resigned as leader in 2002 following the poor results for the Labour Party in the 2002 general election. Former Democratic Left TD Pat Rabbitte became the new leader, the first to be elected directly by the members of the party.

=== Rabbitte as leader 2002 to 2007 ===
Prior to the 2004 local elections, party leader Pat Rabbitte had endorsed a mutual transfer pact with Fine Gael leader Enda Kenny. Rabbitte proposed an extension of this strategy, named "the Mullingar Accord", going into the 2007 general election. Although Rabbitte's strategy was opposed by some influential members such as Brendan Howlin it was supported by approximately 80% of Labour conference delegates. However, at 2007 general election the Labour Party failed to increase its seat total and had a net loss of 1 seat, returning with 20 seats. Fine Gael, the Labour Party, the Green Party and independents did not have enough seats to form a government. Pat Rabbitte resisted calls to enter negotiations with Fianna Fáil on forming a government. Eventually, Fianna Fáil entered government with the Progressive Democrats and the Green Party with the support of independents. In the aftermath, Rabbitte resigned as Labour Party leader in late August, taking responsibility for the general election result. In his wake Eamon Gilmore was elected, unopposed, as the new Labour leader.

=== 2007 to 2016 ===
==== Initial surge of support ====
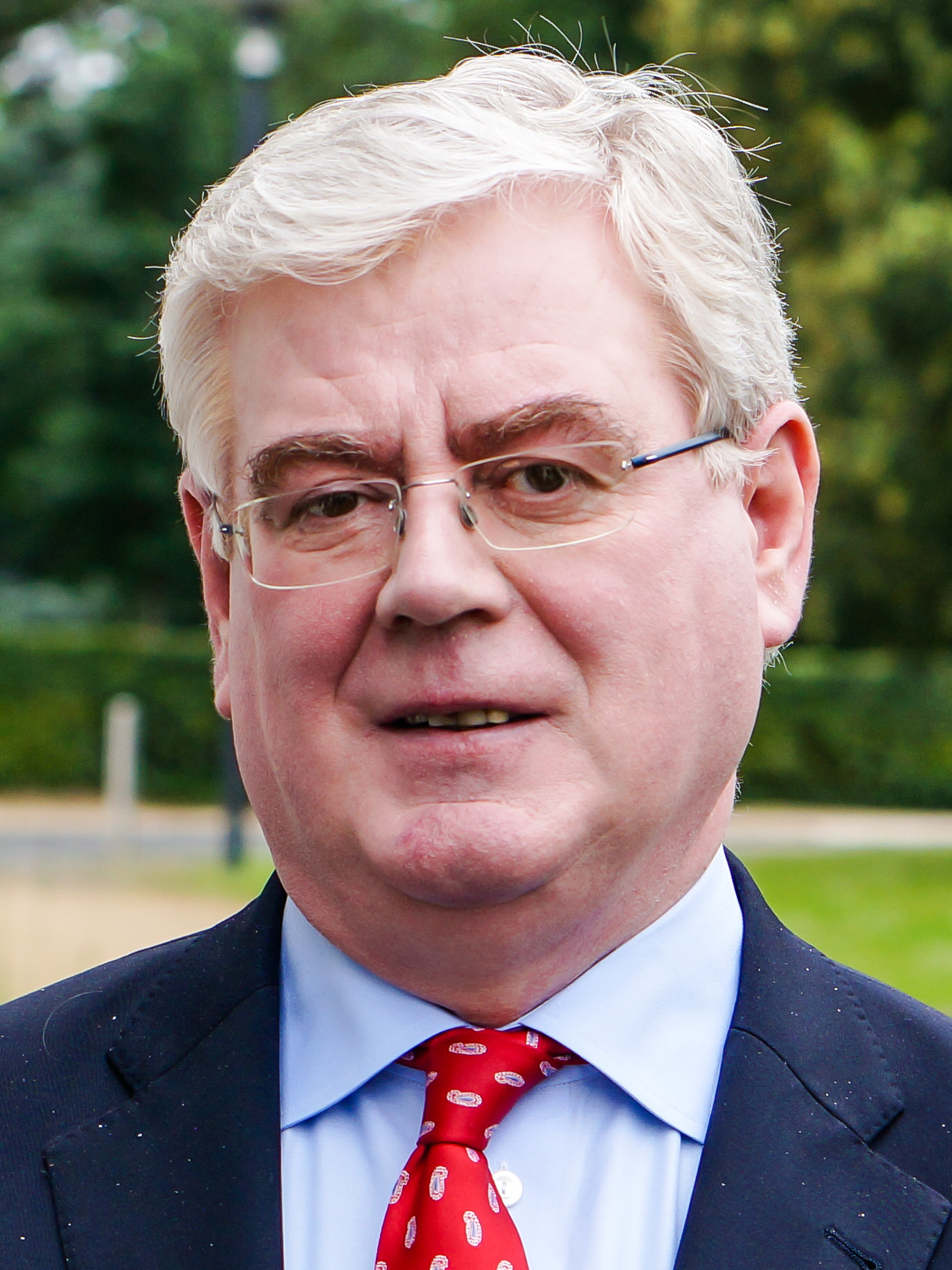
Eamon Gilmore led the party for seven years between 2007 and 2014

Following the onset of the post-2008 Irish economic downturn, Labour's political fortunes began to alter rapidly. At the local elections of 5 June 2009, the Labour Party added 31 new councillors to their tally and performed particularly well in the Dublin region. At the 2009 European Parliament election held on the same day, the Labour Party increased its number of seats from one to three, retaining the seat of Proinsias De Rossa in the Dublin constituency, while gaining seats in the East constituency with Nessa Childers, and in the South constituency with Alan Kelly. It was the first time since the 1979 European Parliament Elections that Labour had equalled the number of seats held in Europe by either Fianna Fáil or Fine Gael.

On 11 June 2010, a poll by MRBI was published in The Irish Times which, for the first time in the history of the state, showed the Labour Party as the most popular, at 32%, ahead of Fine Gael at 28% and Fianna Fáil at 17%. Eamon Gilmore's approval ratings were also the highest of any Dáil leader, standing at 46%.

==== Entering government in 2011 and subsequent decline in support ====
At the 2011 general election, Labour received 19.5% of first preference votes, and 37 seats. It was the most seats the Labour party had ever won in the Dáil, and their highest percentage of first-preference-votes since the Spring Tide of 1992. On 9 March 2011, it became the junior partner in a coalition government with Fine Gael for the period of the 31st Dáil. Eamon Gilmore was appointed as Tánaiste (deputy prime minister) and Minister for Foreign Affairs and Trade.

In October 2011 the Labour Party's candidate, Michael D. Higgins was elected as the 9th President of Ireland. On the same day, Labour's Patrick Nulty won the Dublin West by-election, making the Labour Party the first government party in Ireland to win a by-election since 1982.

Labour lost seven parliamentary members over the course of the 31st Dáil. On 15 November 2011 Willie Penrose resigned over the closure of an army barracks in his constituency. On 1 December 2011 Tommy Broughan lost the party whip after voting against the government in relation to the Bank Guarantee Scheme. On 6 December 2011 Patrick Nulty lost the party whip after voting against the VAT increase in the 2012 budget. On 26 September 2012 Róisín Shortall resigned as Minister of State for Primary Care and lost the party whip after conflict with the Minister for Health James Reilly. On 13 December 2012 Colm Keaveney lost the party whip after voting against the cut to the respite care grant in the 2013 budget. Senator James Heffernan lost the party whip in December 2012 after voting against the government on the Social Welfare Bill. MEP Nessa Childers resigned from the parliamentary party on 5 April 2013, saying that she "no longer want[ed] to support a Government that is actually hurting people", and she resigned from the party in July 2013. In June 2013, Patrick Nulty and Colm Keaveney resigned from the Labour Party. Willie Penrose returned to the parliamentary Labour Party in October 2013.

Previous logos of the Labour Party

Logo of the Labour Party c. 2011

Logo of the Labour Party from 2016–2021

On 26 May 2014, Gilmore resigned as party leader after Labour's poor performance in the European and local elections. On 4 July 2014, Joan Burton won the leadership election, defeating Alex White by 78% to 22%. On her election, she said that the Labour Party "would focus on social repair, and govern more with the heart". Burton was the first woman to lead the Labour Party.

==== 2016 ====
In the 2016 general election, Labour suffered the worst general election in its history, winning only 7 of the 37 seats they had won in 2011 and receiving 6.6% of first preference votes. In May, Burton announced that she would step down as leader of the party.

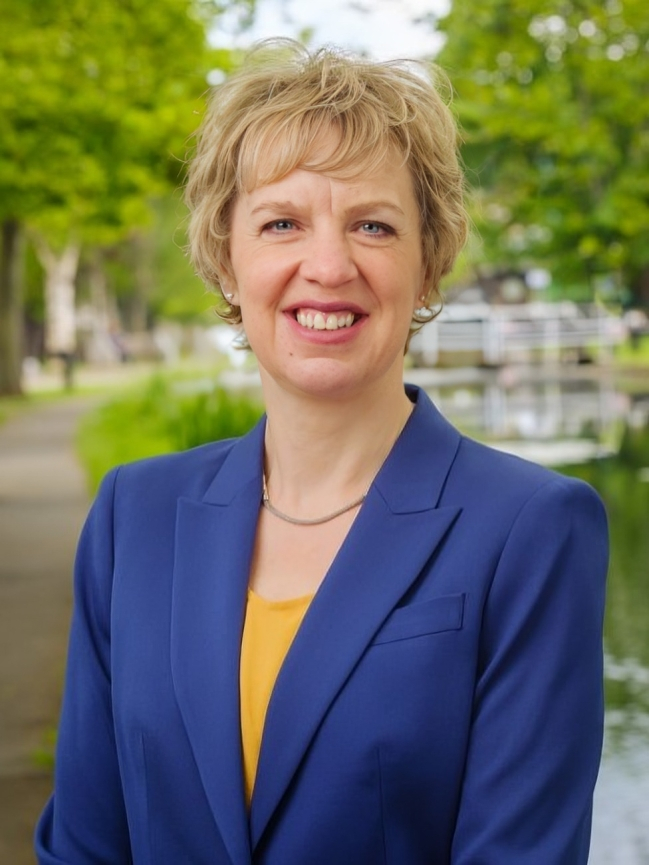
Ivana Bacik has led the party since March 2022

On 20 May 2016, Brendan Howlin was elected unopposed as leader; following his election, some within the party expressed dissatisfaction that there was no member's ballot held, as prospective leadership candidate Alan Kelly did not receive a nomination from any sitting TD. Howlin stated that as leader he was prepared to bring Labour back into government, citing the lack of influence on policy from opposition. He denied any suggestions that Labour could lose any further support from their 2016 performance, stating "We're not some outfit that comes out of the morning mist and disappears again. We're the oldest party in the state".

=== 2019–present ===
In the Irish local elections and the European Parliament election of May 2019, despite a decreased vote share by 1.4%, Labour increased their seat count on local authorities to 57, an increase of six. However, the party failed to win a European seat, leaving the S&D Group unrepresented by an Irish MEP for the first time since 1984. At the February 2020 election, the party's first preference vote dropped to 4.4%, a record low. While the party made gains in Dublin Bay North and Louth, Joan Burton and Jan O'Sullivan both lost their seats and the party failed to retain its seat in Longford-Westmeath caused by the retirement of Willie Penrose. In addition former TDs Emmet Stagg, Joanna Tuffy, and Joe Costello failed to re-capture the seats they lost in 2016. In the subsequent Seanad elections, Labour won 5 seats, which tied them with Sinn Féin as the third-largest party in the House.

After the general election, Brendan Howlin announced his intention to step down as the leader of the Labour Party. On 3 April 2020 Alan Kelly was elected as party leader, edging out fellow Dáil colleague Aodhán Ó Ríordáin 55% to 45%. In July 2021, the party gained a seventh TD in the Dáil after Ivana Bacik won the 2021 Dublin Bay South by-election. In March 2022, Kelly resigned suddenly as leader, less than two years into the role and having not led the party into an election. He did so upon being informed by Sean Sherlock and Duncan Smith, both of whom had supported him in his leadership bid, along with Mark Wall, that the parliamentary party had lost "collective confidence" in his leadership. The plan to remove him was devised by the parliamentary party in the home of Senator Marie Sherlock, in the absence of Kelly. An internal report reportedly showed that every one of the party's nationally elected representatives were at risk of losing their seats in the next general election. Kelly became emotional as he announced his resignation, stating that the decision by the parliamentary party was a "surprise" to him, but that he accepted it immediately. On 24 March 2022 Ivana Bacik was confirmed as the new leader of the party unopposed at a conference in Dublin.

At the 2024 European Parliament election, Aodhán Ó Ríordáin was elected in the Dublin constituency, the first MEP elected for the party since 2009. In the 2024 Irish general election, Labour under Bacik's leadership nearly doubled their Dáil representation to 11 seats.

== Ideology and policies ==
=== Overview ===
The Labour Party holds a pro-European stance and is a party of the centre-left which has been described as a social democratic party but is referred to in its constitution as a democratic socialist party. Its constitution refers to the party as a "movement of democratic socialists, social democrats, environmentalists, progressives, feminists (and) trade unionists". Writing in the Irish Independent in 2011, Eamon Delaney described Labour as a "big tent party".

The stance of the Labour Party has changed dramatically over time. In 1964 American historian Emmet Larkin described the Irish Labour Party as "the most opportunistically conservative Labour Party anywhere in the known world" due to its Catholic outlook in an Ireland where 95 percent of the population was Roman Catholic. It was known for its longstanding unwillingness (along with Ireland's other major parties) to support any policy that could be construed as sympathetic to secularism or communism. However, from the 1980s it was associated with advocacy for socially liberal policies, with former leader Eamon Gilmore stating in 2007 that "more than any other political movement, it was Labour and its allies which drove the modernisation of the Irish state."

In the past Labour has been referred to, derisively, as "the political wing of the Society of St. Vincent de Paul." That Labour was influenced by Catholicism is not unusual in the Irish context (likewise, both Fine Gael and Fianna Fáil were also products of a predominantly Catholic society). Labour's ethos and often its language was profoundly Christian. Following the official separation of the Irish Labour Party and Irish Trade Union Congress into two different organisations in 1930, early drafts of Labour's constitution referred to the responsibilities of the 'Christian state', but these had all been removed by the time the constitution was put before the new party's conference for approval. However, the Free State's commitment to a full-scale devotional revival of Catholicism was reflected in the outlook and policies of the party. The 'Starry Plough,' the traditional symbol of Labour, reflects a Catholic tradition and biblical reference to Isaiah 2:3-4, which is integral to its design. Like Fianna Fáil, Labour embraced corporatist policies, again influenced by the Catholic Church. This was deemed to be important for both in terms of winning electoral support from the lower and middle classes. However, Labour later became associated with increasing secularism and championing socially liberal causes in relation to contraception, divorce, LGBT rights and abortion. Its support base also shifted greatly towards postmaterialists. The Labour Party also changed its position from Euroscepticism in 1972 to pro-Europeanism and ideological integration with European social democratic parties.

=== LGBT rights policies ===
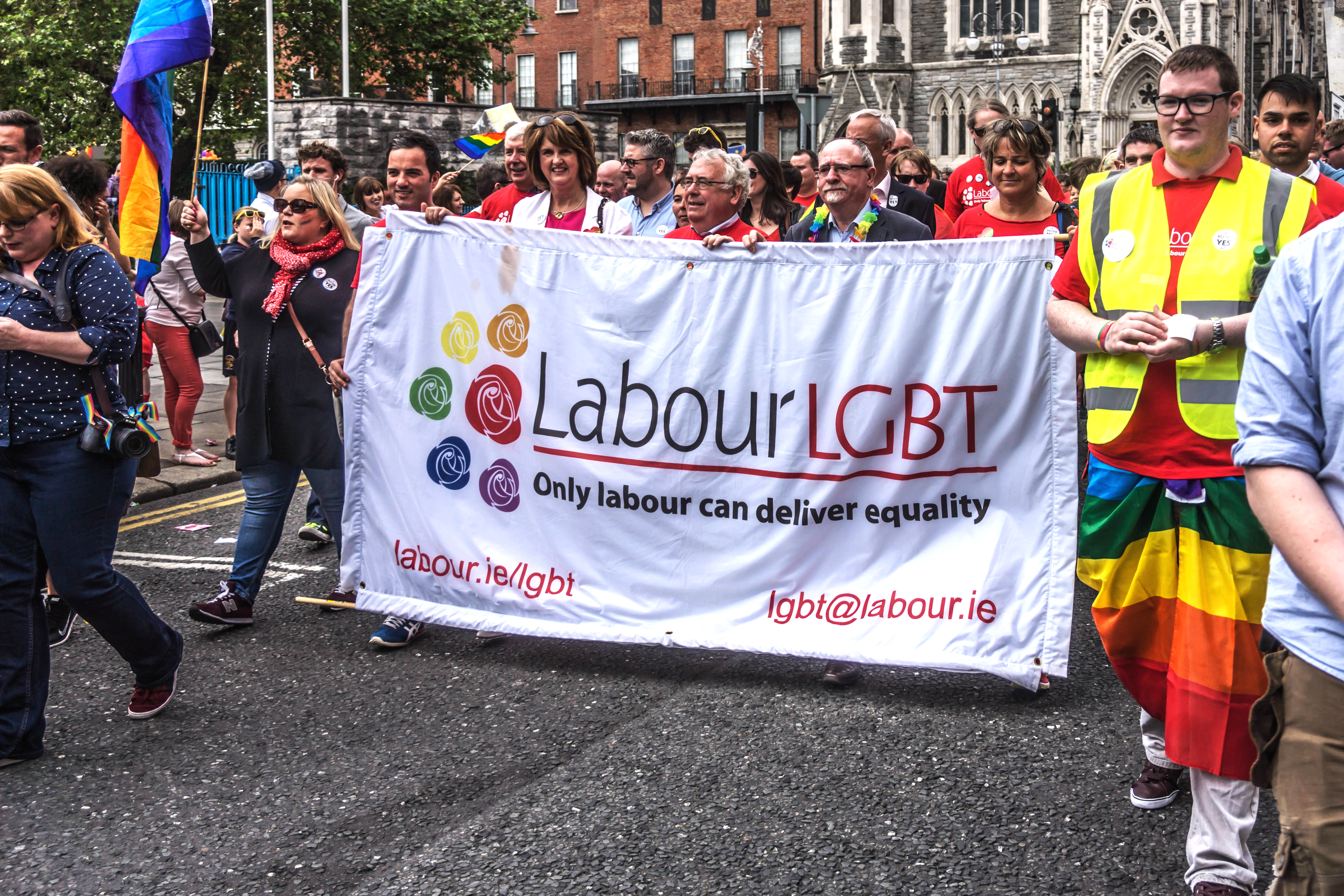
Members of Labour taking part in the 2015 Dublin Pride Parade

The Labour Party has been involved in various campaigns for LGBT rights and put forward many bills. The party was in government in 1993 when homosexuality was decriminalised in Ireland, and it was President Mary Robinson, herself a longstanding LGBT advocate, who signed the bill into law. Mervyn Taylor published the Employment Equality Bill in 1996, which was enacted in 1998, outlawing discrimination in the workplace on the grounds of sexual orientation. Taylor also published the Equal Status Bill in 1997, enacted in 2000, outlawing discrimination in the provision of goods and services on grounds listed including sexual orientation.

At the 2002 general election, only the manifestos of the Green Party and Labour explicitly referred to the rights of same-sex couples.

In 2003, Labour LGBT was founded. This was the first time a political party in Ireland had formed an LGBT wing.

In December 2006, Labour TD Brendan Howlin tabled a private member's civil unions bill in Dáil Éireann, proposing the legalisation of civil partnerships and adoption for same-sex couples. The Fianna Fáil government amended the bill to delay it for six months time, however the Dáil was dissolved for the 2007 Irish general election before this could happen. Labour again brought this bill before the Dáil in 2007 but it was voted down by the government, with the Green Party, who had formerly supported gay marriage, also voting in opposition to the bill, with spokesperson Ciarán Cuffe arguing that the bill was unconstitutional.

At their 2010 national conference Labour passed a motion calling for transgender rights and to legislate for a gender recognition act.

During their time in government, Ireland became the first country to legalise same-sex marriage by popular vote.

=== Social policies ===
Labour supported the repeal of the Eighth Amendment of the Constitution of Ireland in 2018 to legalise abortion, and canvassed for a Yes vote in that referendum.

Alan Kelly sponsored a bill in 2020 that called for all workers to receive a legal right to sick pay, as well as paid leave for employees whose children have to stay home from school due to COVID-19 measures. The government amended this bill to delay it for six months, a decision that senator Marie Sherlock branded as "unacceptable".

=== Education policies ===
In 2020, Labour TD Aodhán Ó Riordáin successfully campaigned for Ireland's free school meals campaign to be extended across summer.

Labour have called for all primary education to be made free by providing grants for books, uniforms and students, and ending the two tier pay system for teachers and secretaries.

=== Housing policies ===
In 2020, Labour proposed building 80,000 social and affordable houses, investing €16 billion into housing and freezing rents. In 2021, they called for a three-year rent freeze and a tax to be placed on vacant houses, as well as investment into student housing and preventing student housing from being converted to short term rentals.

=== Health policies ===
In their 2020 manifesto, Labour proposed spending an additional 1 billion euro per year on health and delivering free GP care for all under 18s.

In 2021, Labour proposed nationalising two hospitals - one in Dublin and one in either Galway or Cork.

=== Climate policies ===
In their climate manifesto in 2020, the party called for halving the country's emissions by 2030, supporting farms transitioning to more environmental forms of farming, restoring peatlands and bogs, banning offshore drilling and supporting a just transition.

=== Drug policies ===
The Labour Party supports the legalisation of cannabis for recreational and medicinal purposes, having outlined this policy in their submission to the Citizen's Assembly on drug use in July 2023.

In 2017, Labour leader Brendan Howlin became the first traditional party leader to back the full decriminalisation of cannabis in Ireland. This came after a motion endorsed by Aodhán Ó Riordáin supporting the legalisation of cannabis for recreational usage was passed at Labour conference. Ó Riordáin had previously voiced his support for the decriminalisation of all drugs, stating that "About 70 per cent of the drugs cases that are before our courts at the moment are for possession for personal use, which to be honest is a complete waste of garda time and criminal justice time", saying that someone suffering from addiction "is fundamentally a patient, who should be surrounded by compassion, not somebody who should be sitting in a court room."

The previous party leader Alan Kelly has stated that he supports the legalisation of cannabis in Ireland on both medicinal and recreational grounds, and current party leader Ivana Bacik has also spoken in support of the legalisation of cannabis.

On 5 November 2025, Labour's health spokesperson, Marie Sherlock TD, introduced a motion in the Dáil calling on the government to decriminalise the drug user and calling for a health led approach to reducing drug addiction and overdose rates in Ireland, focusing on getting the drug user out of addiction rather than into prison.

=== Cultural policies ===
The party has called for a campaign to promote the usage of spoken Irish, funding outreach initiatives for minorities and marginalised communities and creating a fund for artists.

== Historical archives ==
The Labour Party donated its archives to the National Library of Ireland in 2012. The records can be accessed by means of the call number: MS 49,494. Subsequently, the records of Democratic Left were also donated to the library and can be access via the call number: MS 49,807.

== Election results ==
=== Dáil Éireann ===
Election	Leader	FPv	%	Seats	%	±	Dáil	Government
1922	Thomas Johnson	132,565	21.3 (#3)	17 / 128	13.3 (#3)	New	3rd	Opposition; 5th ministry, 1st executive (PT SF/CnG minority)
1923	Thomas Johnson	111,939	10.6 (#4)	14 / 153	9.2 (#4)	▼3	4th	Opposition; 2nd executive (CnG minority)
June 1927	Thomas Johnson	143,849	12.6 (#3)	22 / 153	14.4 (#3)	▲8	5th	Opposition; 3rd executive (CnG minority)
Sep. 1927	Thomas Johnson	106,184	9.1 (#3)	13 / 153	8.5 (#3)	▼9	6th	Opposition; 4th, 5th executive (CnG-FP minority)
1932	Thomas J. O'Connell	98,286	7.7 (#3)	7 / 153	4.6 (#3)	▼6	7th	Confidence and supply 6th executive (FF minority)
1933	William Norton	79,221	5.7 (#4)	8 / 153	5.2 (#4)	▲1	8th	Confidence and supply 7th executive (FF minority)
1937	William Norton	135,758	10.3 (#3)	13 / 138	9.4 (#3)	▲5	9th	Confidence and supply 8th executive, 1st government (FF minority)
1938	William Norton	128,945	10.0 (#3)	9 / 138	6.5 (#3)	▼4	10th	Opposition; 2nd government (FF majority)
1943	William Norton	208,812	15.7 (#3)	17 / 138	12.3 (#3)	▲8	11th	Opposition; 3rd government (FF minority)
1944	William Norton	106,767	8.8 (#4)	8 / 138	5.8 (#3)	▼9	12th	Opposition; 4th government (FF majority)
1948	William Norton	115,073	8.7 (#3)	14 / 147	9.5 (#3)	▲6	13th	Government; 5th government (FG-Lab-CnP-CnT- NL-MR-Ind majority)
1951	William Norton	151,828	11.4 (#3)	16 / 147	10.9 (#3)	▼3 (Note: The Labour Party and the National Labour Party had reunited since the last election. The figures for the Labour party are compared to the two parties combined totals in the previous election.)	14th	Opposition; 6th government (FF minority)
1954	William Norton	161,034	12.1 (#3)	19 / 147	12.9 (#3)	▲3	15th	Government; 7th government (FG-Lab-CnT minority)
1957	William Norton	111,747	9.1 (#3)	12 / 147	8.2 (#3)	▼7	16th	Opposition; 8th, 9th government (FF majority)
1961	Brendan Corish	136,111	11.6 (#3)	16 / 144	11.1 (#3)	▲4	17th	Opposition; 10th government (FF minority)
1965	Brendan Corish	192,740	15.4 (#3)	22 / 144	15.3 (#3)	▲6	18th	Opposition; 11th, 12th government (FF majority)
1969	Brendan Corish	224,498	17.0 (#3)	18 / 144	12.5 (#3)	▼4	19th	Opposition; 13th government (FF majority)
1973	Brendan Corish	184,656	13.7 (#3)	19 / 144	13.2 (#3)	▲1	20th	Government; 14th government (FG-Lab majority)
1977	Brendan Corish	186,410	11.6 (#3)	17 / 148	11.5 (#3)	▼2	21st	Opposition; 15th, 16th government (FF majority)
1981	Frank Cluskey	169,990	9.9 (#3)	15 / 166	9.0 (#3)	▼2	22nd	Government; 17th government (FG-Lab minority)
Feb. 1982	Michael O'Leary	151,875	9.1 (#3)	15 / 166	9.0 (#3)	Steady	23rd	Opposition; 18th government (FF minority)
Nov. 1982	Dick Spring	158,115	9.4 (#3)	16 / 166	9.6 (#3)	▲1	24th	Government; 19th government (FG-Lab majority)
1987	Dick Spring	114,551	6.4 (#4)	12 / 166	7.2 (#4)	▼4	25th	Opposition; 20th government (FF minority)
1989	Dick Spring	156,989	9.5 (#3)	15 / 166	9.0 (#3)	▲3	26th	Opposition; 21st, 22nd government (FF-PD majority)
1992	Dick Spring	333,013	19.3 (#3)	33 / 166	19.9	▲18	27th	Government; 23rd government (FF-Lab majority)
1992	Dick Spring	333,013	19.3 (#3)	33 / 166	19.9	▲18	27th	Government; 24th government (FG-Lab-DL majority)
1997	Dick Spring	186,044	10.4 (#3)	17 / 166	10.2 (#3)	▼16	28th	Opposition; 25th government (FF-PD minority)
2002	Ruairi Quinn	200,130	10.8 (#3)	20 / 166	12.1 (#3)	▼1 (Note: Compared to the combined total for the Labour Party and Democratic Left in 1997. The two parties merged in 1999.)	29th	Opposition; 26th government (FF-PD majority)
2007	Pat Rabbitte	209,175	10.1 (#3)	20 / 166	12.1 (#3)	Steady	30th	Opposition; 27th, 28th government (FF-GP-PD/Ind majority)
2011	Eamon Gilmore	431,796	19.5 (#2)	37 / 166	22.3 (#2)	▲17	31st	Government; 29th government (FG-Lab majority)
2016	Joan Burton	140,898	6.6 (#4)	7 / 158	4.4 (#4)	▼30	32nd	Opposition; 30th, 31st government (FG-Ind minority)
2020	Brendan Howlin	95,582	4.4 (#5)	6 / 160	3.8 (#5)	▼1	33rd	Opposition; 32nd, 33rd, 34th government (FF-FG-GP majority)
2024	Ivana Bacik	102,457	4.6 (#5)	11 / 174	6.3 (#4)	▲5	34th	Opposition; 35th government (FF-FG-Ind majority)

=== Seanad Éireann ===
Election	Seats won	±	Position	First Pref votes	%
1925	5 / 60	▼1	2nd	46,776	15.3%

=== Presidential elections ===
Election	Nominee	Party	Alliance	1st	Final
1938	Douglas Hyde	Ind	Fianna Fáil; Fine Gael	Unopposed	
1945	Patrick McCartan	Ind	Clann na Talmhan	19.6%	—N/a
Did not contest any elections between 1952 and 1983
1990	Mary Robinson	Lab	Worker's Party; Green	38.9%	51.9%
1997	Adi Roche	Lab	Democratic Left; Green	7.0%	—N/a
2004	Mary McAleese	Ind	List: Fianna Fáil; Fine Gael; Progressive Democrats; Green; Sinn Féin	Unopposed	
2011	Michael D. Higgins	Lab	—N/a	39.6%	56.8%
2018	Michael D. Higgins	Ind	List: Fianna Fáil; Fine Gael; Social Democrats; Green	55.8%	—N/a
2025	Catherine Connolly	Ind	List: Sinn Féin; Social Democrats; PBP–Solidarity; Green Party; 100% Redress; Independents	63.6%	—N/a

=== European Parliament ===
Election	Leader	FPv	%	Seats	%	+/−	EP Group	EP Party
1979	Frank Cluskey	193,898	14.5 (#3)	4 / 15	26.7 (#2)	New	SOC	CSPEC
1984	Dick Spring	93,656	8.4 (#3)	0 / 15	—N/a	▼4	SOC	CSPEC
1989	Dick Spring	155,572	9.5 (#4)	1 / 15	6.7 (#4)	▲1	SOC	CSPEC
1994	Dick Spring	124,972	11.0 (#3)	1 / 15	6.7 (#4)	Steady	PES	PES
1999	Ruairi Quinn	121,542	8.7 (#3)	1 / 15	6.7 (#4)	Steady	PES	PES
2004	Pat Rabbitte	188,132	10.6 (#4)	1 / 13	7.7 (#4)	Steady	PES	PES
2009	Eamon Gilmore	254,669	13.9 (#3)	3 / 12	25.0 (#3)	▲2	S&D	PES
2014	Eamon Gilmore	88,229	5.33 (#4)	0 / 11	—N/a	▼3	S&D	PES
2019	Brendan Howlin	52,753	3.14 (#6)	0 / 13	—N/a	Steady	S&D	PES
2024	Ivana Bacik	58,975	3.4 (#5)	1 / 14	7.1 (#4)	▲1	S&D	PES

=== Northern Ireland ===
==== Westminster (House of Commons) ====
Election	Leader	Seats (out of NI total)		Government
Election	Leader	#	±	Government
1950	William Norton	0 / 12	Steady	—N/a
1951	William Norton	1 / 12	▲1	Conservative
1955	William Norton	0 / 12	▼1	—N/a

==== Stormont (Parliament of Northern Ireland) ====
Election	Body	Seats	Outcome
1953	8th Parliament	1 / 52	UUP Majority
1958	9th Parliament	0 / 52	UUP Majority
1962	10th Parliament	1 / 52	UUP Majority

It no longer contests Northern Irish elections but endorses the Social Democratic and Labour Party.

== Structure ==
The Labour Party is a membership organisation consisting of Labour (Dáil) constituency councils, affiliated trade unions and socialist societies. Members who are elected to parliamentary positions (Dáil, Seanad, European Parliament) form the Parliamentary Labour Party (PLP). The party's decision-making bodies on a national level formally include the executive board (formerly known as the National Executive Committee), Labour Party Conference and Central Council. The executive board has responsibility for organisation and finance, with the Central Council being responsible for policy formation – although in practice the Parliamentary leadership has the final say on policy. The Labour Party Conference debates motions put forward by branches, constituency councils, party members sections and affiliates. Motions set principles of policy and organisation but are not generally detailed policy statements.

For many years Labour held to a policy of not allowing residents of Northern Ireland to apply for membership, instead supporting the Social Democratic and Labour Party (SDLP). The National Conference approved the establishment of a Northern Ireland Members Forum but it has not agreed to contest elections there.

As a party with a constitutional commitment to democratic socialism founded by trade unions to represent the interests of working class people, Labour's link with unions has always been a defining characteristic of the party. Over time this link has come under increasing strain, with most craft based unions based in the public sector and Irish Congress of Trades Unions having disaffiliated since the 1950s. The remaining affiliated unions are primarily private sector general unions. Currently affiliated unions still send delegates to the National Conference in proportion to the size of their membership. Recent constitutional changes mean that in future, affiliated unions will send delegations based on the number of party members in their organisation.

=== Sections ===
Within the Labour Party there are different sections:

- Labour Youth
- Labour Women
- Labour Trade Unionists
- Labour Councillors
- Labour Equality (this section also includes groups such as Labour LGBT)
- Labour Disability

== Affiliates ==
The Irish Labour Party constitution makes provision for both Trade Unions and Socialist Societies to affiliate to the party. There are currently seven Trade Unions affiliated to the Party:

- Munster & District Graphical Society
- Fórsa (Municipal Employees Division)
- National Union of Rail, Maritime and Transport Workers (RMT)
- General, Municipal and Boilermakers' Union (GMB)
- Services, Industrial, Professional and Technical Union (SIPTU)
- Bakers, Food and Allied Workers Union (BFWAU)
- Transport Salaried Staffs Association (TSSA)

Socialist Societies Affiliated to the Party:

- Labour Party Lawyers Group
- Association of Labour Teachers
- Labour Social Services Group

== Leadership ==
=== Party leader ===
Name	Portrait	Constituency	Term of Office		Office(s)
Thomas Johnson		Dublin County	1914	1927	Leader of the Opposition
Thomas J. O'Connell		Mayo South	1927	1932	
William Norton		Kildare	1932	2 March 1960	Tánaiste; Minister for Social Welfare; Minister for Industry and Commerce
Brendan Corish		Wexford	2 March 1960	26 June 1977	Tánaiste; Minister for Health; Minister for Social Welfare
Frank Cluskey		Dublin South-Central	1 July 1977	12 June 1981	
Michael O'Leary		Dublin North-Central	17 June 1981	1 November 1982	Tánaiste; Minister for Energy
Dick Spring		Kerry North	1 November 1982	13 November 1997	Tánaiste; Minister for the Environment; Minister for Energy; Minister for Foreign Affairs
Ruairi Quinn		Dublin South-East	13 November 1997	25 October 2002	
Pat Rabbitte		Dublin South-West	25 October 2002	6 September 2007	
Eamon Gilmore		Dún Laoghaire	6 September 2007	4 July 2014	Tánaiste; Minister for Foreign Affairs and Trade
Joan Burton		Dublin West	4 July 2014	20 May 2016	Tánaiste; Minister for Social Protection
Brendan Howlin		Wexford	20 May 2016	3 April 2020	
Alan Kelly		Tipperary	3 April 2020	24 March 2022	
Ivana Bacik		Dublin Bay South	24 March 2022	Incumbent	

=== Deputy leader ===
Name	Period	Constituency
Barry Desmond	1982–1989	Dún Laoghaire
Ruairi Quinn	1989–1997	Dublin South-East
Brendan Howlin	1997–2002	Wexford
Liz McManus	2002–2007	Wicklow
Joan Burton	2007–2014	Dublin West
Alan Kelly	2014–2016	Tipperary North
Position abolished

=== Seanad leader ===
Name	Period	Panel or constituency
Michael Ferris	1981–1989	Agricultural Panel
Jack Harte	1989–1993	Labour Panel
Jan O'Sullivan	1993–1997	Administrative Panel
Joe Costello	1997–2002	Administrative Panel
Brendan Ryan	2002–2007	National University of Ireland
Alex White	2007–2011	Cultural and Educational Panel
Phil Prendergast	2011 (acting)	Labour Panel
Ivana Bacik	2011–2021	Dublin University
Rebecca Moynihan	2021–2025	Administrative Panel

== Elected representatives ==
=== Parliamentary Labour Party ===
The Parliamentary Labour Party (PLP) is the section of the party that is made up of its members of the Houses of the Oireachtas and of the European Parliament. As of September 2025 there are 14 members of the PLP: 11 TDs and 2 senators and one MEP.

=== Councillors ===
At the 2014 local elections Labour lost more than half of local authority seats; 51 councillors were elected - this result led to the resignation of party leader, Eamon Gilmore. Following the 2019 Irish local elections, the party had 57 local representatives. In the 2024 Irish local elections, the party returned 56 councillors.

== See also ==
- History of the Labour Party (Ireland)
- Democratic Left (Ireland)
- Social Democratic and Labour Party (Northern Ireland)
