= Frank Cluskey =

Irish politician (1930–1989)

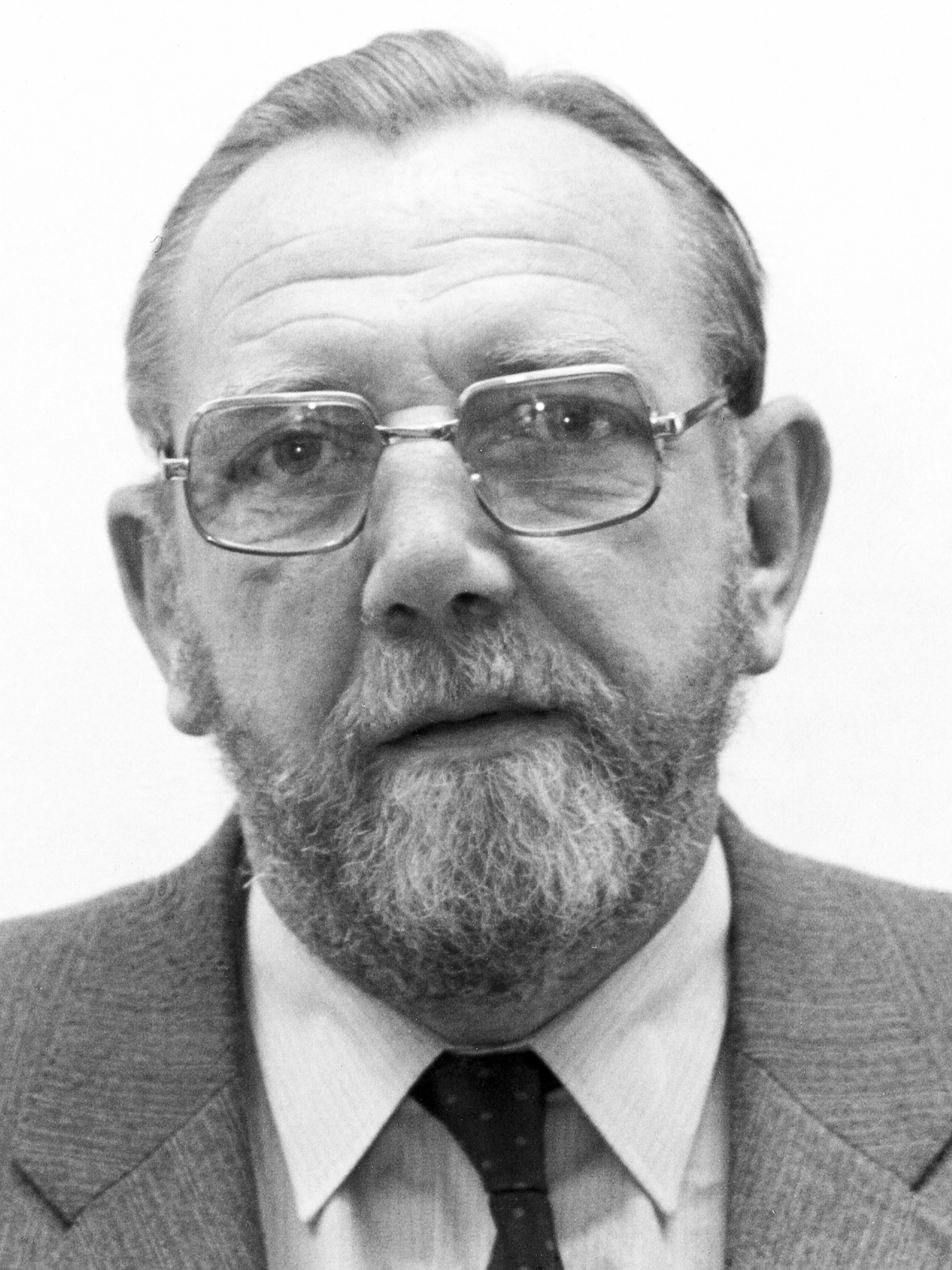
- Cluskey in 1981

Minister for Trade, Commerce and Tourism
- In office 14 December 1982 – 8 December 1983
- Taoiseach: Garret FitzGerald
- Preceded by: Pádraig Flynn
- Succeeded by: Garret FitzGerald

Leader of the Labour Party
- In office 1 July 1977 – 12 June 1981
- Preceded by: Brendan Corish
- Succeeded by: Michael O'Leary

Parliamentary Secretary
- 1973–1977: Social Welfare

Teachta Dála
- In office February 1982 – 7 May 1989
- In office June 1977 – June 1981
- Constituency: Dublin South-Central
- In office June 1969 – June 1977
- Constituency: Dublin Central
- In office April 1965 – June 1969
- Constituency: Dublin South-Central

Member of the European Parliament
- In office 1 July 1981 – 24 November 1982
- Constituency: Dublin

Lord Mayor of Dublin
- In office 1968–1969
- Preceded by: Thomas Stafford
- Succeeded by: James O'Keeffe (1974)

Personal details
- Born: Francis Cluskey; 8 April 1930 Dublin, Ireland
- Died: 7 May 1989 (aged 59) Dublin, Ireland
- Party: Labour Party
- Spouse: Eileen Gillespie (m. 1956; died 1978)
- Children: 3
- Relatives: May Cluskey (sister)
- Education: St. Vincent's C.B.S.

Frank Cluskey (8 April 1930 – 7 May 1989) was an Irish Labour Party politician who served as Minister for Trade, Commerce and Tourism from 1982 to 1983, Leader of the Labour Party from 1977 to 1981 and Parliamentary Secretary to the Minister for Social Welfare from 1973 to 1977. He served as a Teachta Dála (TD) for the Dublin South-Central and Dublin Central constituencies from 1965 to 1981 and 1982 to 1989.

== Early and personal life ==
Cluskey was born on 8 April 1930 in Dublin, the youngest of two sons and three daughters of Francis Cluskey a butcher and active trade unionist, and Elizabeth Cluskey (née Millington). His father was long-serving secretary of the butchers' section of the Workers' Union of Ireland (WUI)), and a close associate of James Larkin. He was educated at St. Vincent's C.B.S. in Glasnevin. He worked as a butcher and then joined the Labour Party. He quickly became a branch secretary in the WUI. He married Eileen Gillespie in 1965, a post office civil servant from Clontarf; she died after a short illness in 1978. They had two daughters and one son.

== Politics ==
At the 1965 general election he was elected as a Labour Party Teachta Dála (TD) for the Dublin South-Central constituency. He was a member of Dublin City Council from 1960 to 1969, and in 1968 he was elected Lord Mayor of Dublin. In 1973 he was appointed Parliamentary Secretary to the Minister for Social Welfare, Brendan Corish. He introduced sweeping reforms to the area while he held that position, pushing through legislation introducing a 'single-mothers' welfare allowance and managing with his colleagues to triple welfare spending between 1973 and 1977. He played a leading role in initiating the EU Poverty Programmes.

The Fine Gael–Labour Party coalition was defeated at the 1977 general election resulting in the resignation of Brendan Corish as Labour Party leader. Cluskey was elected the new leader of the Labour Party. In 1981, the Labour Party entered into a coalition government with Fine Gael. However Cluskey had lost his seat at the 1981 general election and resigned the party leadership. On 1 July 1981, he was appointed as a Member of the European Parliament (MEP) for Dublin, replacing Michael O'Leary, who had resigned the seat after succeeding Cluskey as Labour leader.

The coalition government fell in January 1982 over a budget dispute, and Cluskey was re-elected to the Dáil at the February 1982 general election. When the coalition returned to office after the November 1982 election, Cluskey was appointed as Minister for Trade, Commerce and Tourism. He then resigned from the European Parliament, to be replaced by Brendan Halligan.

On 8 December 1983 he resigned as minister due to a fundamental disagreement over government policy about the Dublin Gas Company. He retained his Dáil seat in the 1987 general election.

Following his re-election his health deteriorated. He died on 7 May 1989 after a long battle with cancer.

Civic offices
Preceded by Thomas Stafford	Lord Mayor of Dublin; 1968–1969	Vacant Position suspended Title next held by James O'Keeffe (1974)
Political offices
Preceded by Johnny Geoghegan	Parliamentary Secretary to the Minister for Social Welfare; 1973–1977	Office abolished
Preceded by Pádraig Flynn	Minister for Trade, Commerce and Tourism; 1982–1983	Succeeded by Garret FitzGerald
Party political offices
Preceded by Brendan Corish	Leader of the Labour Party; 1977–1981	Succeeded by Michael O'Leary

Dáil	Election	Deputy (Party)	Deputy (Party)	Deputy (Party)	Deputy (Party)	Deputy (Party)
13th	1948	Seán Lemass (FF)	James Larkin Jnr (Lab)	Con Lehane (CnaP)	Maurice E. Dockrell (FG)	John McCann (FF)
14th	1951	Seán Lemass (FF)	James Larkin Jnr (Lab)	Philip Brady (FF)	Maurice E. Dockrell (FG)	John McCann (FF)
15th	1954	Seán Lemass (FF)	James Larkin Jnr (Lab)	Thomas Finlay (FG)	Maurice E. Dockrell (FG)	Celia Lynch (FF)
16th	1957	Seán Lemass (FF)	Jack Murphy (Ind.)	Philip Brady (FF)	Maurice E. Dockrell (FG)	Celia Lynch (FF)
16th	1958 by-election	Seán Lemass (FF)	Patrick Cummins (FF)	Philip Brady (FF)	Maurice E. Dockrell (FG)	Celia Lynch (FF)
17th	1961	Seán Lemass (FF)	Patrick Cummins (FF)	Philip Brady (FF)	Maurice E. Dockrell (FG)	Joseph Barron (CnaP)
18th	1965	Seán Lemass (FF)	Frank Cluskey (Lab)	Philip Brady (FF)	Maurice E. Dockrell (FG)	Thomas J. Fitzpatrick (FF)
19th	1969	Richie Ryan (FG)	Ben Briscoe (FF)	Philip Brady (FF)	John O'Donovan (Lab)	4 seats 1969–1977
20th	1973	Richie Ryan (FG)	Ben Briscoe (FF)	Philip Brady (FF)	John Kelly (FG)	4 seats 1969–1977
21st	1977	Fergus O'Brien (FG)	Frank Cluskey (Lab)	Thomas J. Fitzpatrick (FF)	3 seats 1977–1981	
22nd	1981	Fergus O'Brien (FG)	Ben Briscoe (FF)	Thomas J. Fitzpatrick (FF)	Gay Mitchell (FG)	John O'Connell (Note: O'Connell served as Ceann Comhairle in the 22nd and 23rd Dáil from 1981 to 1983 and was returned automatically at the February 1982 and November 1982 general elections. He joined Fianna Fáil in January 1985.) (Ind.)
23rd	1982 (Feb)	Frank Cluskey (Lab)	Ben Briscoe (FF)	Thomas J. Fitzpatrick (FF)	Gay Mitchell (FG)	John O'Connell (Ind.)
24th	1982 (Nov)	Frank Cluskey (Lab)	Ben Briscoe (FF)	Fergus O'Brien (FG)	Gay Mitchell (FG)	John O'Connell (Ind.)
25th	1987	Frank Cluskey (Lab)	Ben Briscoe (FF)	Fergus O'Brien (FG)	Gay Mitchell (FG)	Mary Mooney (FF)
26th	1989	John O'Connell (FF)	Ben Briscoe (FF)	Fergus O'Brien (FG)	Gay Mitchell (FG)	Eric Byrne (WP)
27th	1992	John O'Connell (FF)	Ben Briscoe (FF)	Pat Upton (Lab)	Gay Mitchell (FG)	4 seats 1992–2002
27th	1994 by-election	Eric Byrne (DL)	Ben Briscoe (FF)	Pat Upton (Lab)	Gay Mitchell (FG)	4 seats 1992–2002
28th	1997	Seán Ardagh (FF)	Ben Briscoe (FF)	Pat Upton (Lab)	Gay Mitchell (FG)	4 seats 1992–2002
28th	1999 by-election	Seán Ardagh (FF)	Ben Briscoe (FF)	Mary Upton (Lab)	Gay Mitchell (FG)	4 seats 1992–2002
29th	2002	Seán Ardagh (FF)	Aengus Ó Snodaigh (SF)	Mary Upton (Lab)	Gay Mitchell (FG)	Michael Mulcahy (FF)
30th	2007	Seán Ardagh (FF)	Aengus Ó Snodaigh (SF)	Mary Upton (Lab)	Catherine Byrne (FG)	Michael Mulcahy (FF)
31st	2011	Eric Byrne (Lab)	Aengus Ó Snodaigh (SF)	Joan Collins (PBP)	Catherine Byrne (FG)	Michael Conaghan (Lab)
32nd	2016	Bríd Smith (AAA–PBP)	Aengus Ó Snodaigh (SF)	Joan Collins (Note: Founded Right to Change in May 2020.) (I4C)	Catherine Byrne (FG)	4 seats from 2016
33rd	2020	Bríd Smith (S–PBP)	Aengus Ó Snodaigh (SF)	Joan Collins (I4C)	Patrick Costello (GP)	4 seats from 2016
34th	2024	Catherine Ardagh (FF)	Aengus Ó Snodaigh (SF)	Máire Devine (SF)	Jen Cummins (SD)	4 seats from 2016

Dáil	Election	Deputy (Party)	Deputy (Party)	Deputy (Party)	Deputy (Party)
19th	1969	Frank Cluskey (Lab)	Vivion de Valera (FF)	Thomas J. Fitzpatrick (FF)	Maurice E. Dockrell (FG)
20th	1973	Frank Cluskey (Lab)	Vivion de Valera (FF)	Thomas J. Fitzpatrick (FF)	Maurice E. Dockrell (FG)
21st	1977	Constituency abolished			

Dáil	Election	Deputy (Party)	Deputy (Party)	Deputy (Party)	Deputy (Party)	Deputy (Party)
22nd	1981	Bertie Ahern (FF)	Michael Keating (FG)	Alice Glenn (FG)	Michael O'Leary (Lab)	George Colley (FF)
23rd	1982 (Feb)	Bertie Ahern (FF)	Michael Keating (FG)	Tony Gregory (Ind.)	Michael O'Leary (Lab)	George Colley (FF)
24th	1982 (Nov)	Bertie Ahern (FF)	Michael Keating (FG)	Tony Gregory (Ind.)	Alice Glenn (FG)	George Colley (FF)
24th	1983 by-election	Bertie Ahern (FF)	Michael Keating (FG)	Tony Gregory (Ind.)	Alice Glenn (FG)	Tom Leonard (FF)
25th	1987	Bertie Ahern (FF)	Michael Keating (PDs)	Tony Gregory (Ind.)	Dermot Fitzpatrick (FF)	John Stafford (FF)
26th	1989	Bertie Ahern (FF)	Pat Lee (FG)	Tony Gregory (Ind.)	Dermot Fitzpatrick (FF)	John Stafford (FF)
27th	1992	Bertie Ahern (FF)	Jim Mitchell (FG)	Tony Gregory (Ind.)	Joe Costello (Lab)	4 seats 1992–2016
28th	1997	Bertie Ahern (FF)	Jim Mitchell (FG)	Tony Gregory (Ind.)	Marian McGennis (FF)	4 seats 1992–2016
29th	2002	Bertie Ahern (FF)	Dermot Fitzpatrick (FF)	Tony Gregory (Ind.)	Joe Costello (Lab)	4 seats 1992–2016
30th	2007	Bertie Ahern (FF)	Cyprian Brady (FF)	Tony Gregory (Ind.)	Joe Costello (Lab)	4 seats 1992–2016
30th	2009 by-election	Bertie Ahern (FF)	Cyprian Brady (FF)	Maureen O'Sullivan (Ind.)	Joe Costello (Lab)	4 seats 1992–2016
31st	2011	Mary Lou McDonald (SF)	Paschal Donohoe (FG)	Maureen O'Sullivan (Ind.)	Joe Costello (Lab)	4 seats 1992–2016
32nd	2016	Mary Lou McDonald (SF)	Paschal Donohoe (FG)	Maureen O'Sullivan (Ind.)	3 seats 2016–2020	
33rd	2020	Mary Lou McDonald (SF)	Paschal Donohoe (FG)	Gary Gannon (SD)	Neasa Hourigan (GP)	4 seats from 2020
34th	2024	Mary Lou McDonald (SF)	Paschal Donohoe (FG)	Gary Gannon (SD)	Marie Sherlock (Lab)	4 seats from 2020
34th	2026 by-election	Mary Lou McDonald (SF)	Daniel Ennis (SD)	Gary Gannon (SD)	Marie Sherlock (Lab)	4 seats from 2020
