= Social Democratic Women =

Social Democratic Women Sociálně demokratické ženy
- Chairperson: Lenka Fojtíková
- Founded: 1990
- Headquarters: Prague
- Ideology: Social democracy Feminism
- National affiliation: Czech Social Democratic Party (ČSSD)
- International affiliation: PES Women

Website
- http://sdz.socdem.cz/

Social Democratic Women (Czech: Sociálně demokratické ženy, SDŽ) the women's wing of the Czech Social Democratic Party. The organisation supports gender equality and gender quotas for candidates of the party. SDŹ was founded in 1990. It constitutes the Czech section of the Socialist International Women.
