= Labour Women =

Organisation within the Irish Labour Party

Labour Women Mná an Lucht Oibre
- Chairperson: Sinead Ahern
- Vice-Chairperson: Michelle Lee
- Founded: 1971
- Headquarters: 11 Hume Street, Dublin 2, D02 T889; Ireland
- Ideology: Social democracy Feminism
- Position: Centre-left
- Mother party: (Republic of Ireland) Labour Party
- International affiliation: Socialist Women International
- European affiliation: PES Women
- Website: www.labour.ie/women

Labour Women (Irish: Mná an Lucht Oibre) is the women's section of the Labour Party of Ireland. All women party members are LW members. Those who wish to be actively involved are included in a mailing list which informs them of events, developments, networking opportunities and any other relevant information.

== History ==
In 1971 the Labour Party established the Women's Advisory Committee to advise the Party leader, Brendan Corish, and was the first Irish political party to do so. The members of this first committee were nominated by the Party leader.

In 1974 this changed when the Labour Women's National Council (LWNC) was established as an elected unit of the Party. The structure was representative, and designed to give the LWNC a mandate from Party members. Each constituency was entitled to nominate up to 5 delegates. The Officers and Executive Committee were elected at the AGM by these delegates, as well as an LWNC representative on the Administrative Council (the then ruling body of the Party).

In 1981 Eileen Desmond was appointed Minister for Health and Social Welfare, which she remained (with a short gap in 1982) until 1987

The LWNC and its members were active in the Abortion and Divorce referendums of the 1980s. The Labour Party leader, Dick Spring, refused to endorse the holding of a "Pro-Life" referendum when the leaders of Fine Gael and Fianna Fáil agreed to do so.

In 1991 the Party Conference passed a resolution creating the position of Constituency Women's Officer, with the dual purpose of encouraging the election of at least one woman to the Executive Committee of each Constituency Council and raising the profile of women's issues. It also committed the Party to the creation of the position of Women's Officer for the Party when finances allowed.

In the run-up to the general election of 1992, the Labour Party selected the highest ever number of women candidates, many activists in the LWNC. The programme for government included a commitment to further equality legislation and the creation of a new Department and Minister for Equality and Law Reform. After the election, the formation of the government resulted in Niamh Bhreathnach being appointed Minister for Education, Joan Burton Minister of State at the Department of Social Welfare and Eithne Fitzgerald as Minister of State in the Department of the Taoiseach, while there were altogether 5 women TDs and 2 senators in the Labour party representation.

Through the 1990s the LWNC continued to be active, both in supporting the Labour Party in opposition and in government and in urging it to deliver policies and programmes relevant to the needs of women. The Labour Party campaigned against the 3 abortion referendums introduced by Fianna Fáil in 1992.

The LWNC was active in the successful campaign led by Mervyn Taylor, the Minister for Equality and Law Reform for the passing of the Referendum to allow divorce. During this period the Party adopted a 25% gender quota for the Executive Committee, General Council and other committees. In 1997 the LWNC presented a new policy document for women at the Party Conference in Limerick. At the end of the decade, the Labour Party and Democratic Left united, with the LWNC receiving an injection of new members. In 1999, the leader of the party, Ruairi Quinn moved on the commitment made in 1991 by the creation of the post of Equality Officer, which included the duties of Women's Officer.

Coming into the early years of the 21st century, the LWNC examined its role within the Labour Party and society as a whole. It revised its constitution and changed its name to the more manageable Labour Women. Labour Women has continued its campaign for reproductive rights in the long aftermath of the abortion referendums of the 1980s and 1990s. It has also continued, like the NWCI of which it could now be an affiliate, to work for improved representation of women in all areas of decision-making, including the political arena. The Labour Party leader, Pat Rabbitte, in 2005 established a party Commission on Women's Participation in the Labour Party which made a number of recommendations in its report.

== Structure ==
Labour Women Conference is held every two years. At Conference, motions are debated and voted upon, setting Labour Women policy. The Labour Women Executive is also elected at Conference.

Every Constituency appoints a Women's Officer. Women's Officer is the Constituency link for LW. She communicates information, liaises with the Party Women's Officer, engages women, promotes women and reports to her Constituency. Constituency Women's Officer organizes events in her constituency and connects with the wider community.

== Executive ==
The Labour Women Executive is elected by women members of the Labour Party at the Labour Women Conference, which is held every two years. The Executive meets monthly and is responsible for guiding the work of Labour Women towards the achievement of its strategic goals and for convening four Labour Women general meetings each year.

The Executive elects one of its members as the Labour Women representative on the Central Council.

The work of Labour Women is facilitated and coordinated on a day-to-day basis by the Party Women's Officer, Kirsi Hanifin, who is a member of the Labour Party staff team. The Party Women's Officer is an ex-officio member of the Executive of Labour Women.

The current Labour Women Executive is:

Position	Name
Chairperson	Sinead Ahern
Secretary	Billie Sparks
International Officer	Angela Timlin
Labour Youth Representative	Chloe Manahan
Committee Member	Angelina Cox
Committee Member	Judy Dunne
Committee Member	Susan Fay
Committee Member	Lainey Hughes
Committee Member	Marie Moynihan
Committee Member	Muireann Neylon
Committee Member	Veronica O'Doherty
Committee Member	Catherine Rotte-Murray
