= 1945 Wexford by-election =

By-election to the 12th Dáil

- 4 December 1945
- Turnout: 32,380 (54.5%)
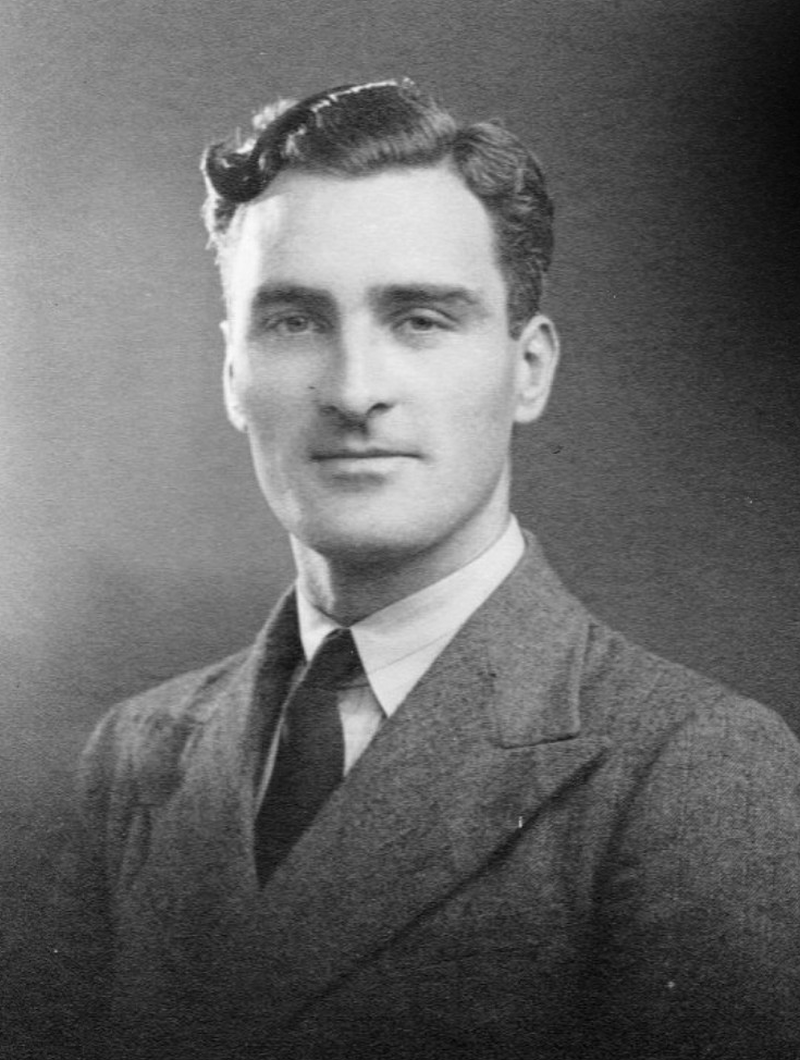
		Moran	Kinsella
Nominee	Brendan Corish	Robert Moran	Patrick Kinsella
Party	Labour	Fianna Fáil	Clann na Talmhan
First preferences	16,263	11,816	3,051
Percentage	50.2%	36.5%	9.4%
TD before election
Richard Corish
Labour
TD after election
Brendan Corish
Labour

A Dáil by-election was held in the constituency of Wexford in Ireland on Tuesday, 4 December 1945, to fill a vacancy in the 12th Dáil. It followed the death of Labour TD Richard Corish on 19 July 1945.

In 1945, Wexford was a five seat constituency comprising County Wexford and several electoral divisions in County Carlow.

The writ of election to fill the vacancy was agreed by the Dáil on 14 November 1945.

The by-election was won by the Labour candidate Brendan Corish, son of the deceased TD, Richard Corish.

Four other by-elections were held on the same day: in Clare, Dublin North-West, Kerry South and Mayo South. Three by-elections were won by Fianna Fáil, one by Clann na Talmhan, and one by Labour.

== Result ==
1945 Wexford by-election
Party	Candidate	FPv%	Count
Party	Candidate	FPv%	1
Labour	Brendan Corish	50.2	16,263
Fianna Fáil	Robert Moran	36.5	11,816
Clann na Talmhan	Patrick Kinsella	9.4	3,051
Independent	Robert Murphy	3.9	1,250
Electorate: 59,369 Valid: 32,380 Quota: 16,191 Turnout: 54.5%
