= Brendan Corish =

Irish politician (1918–1990)

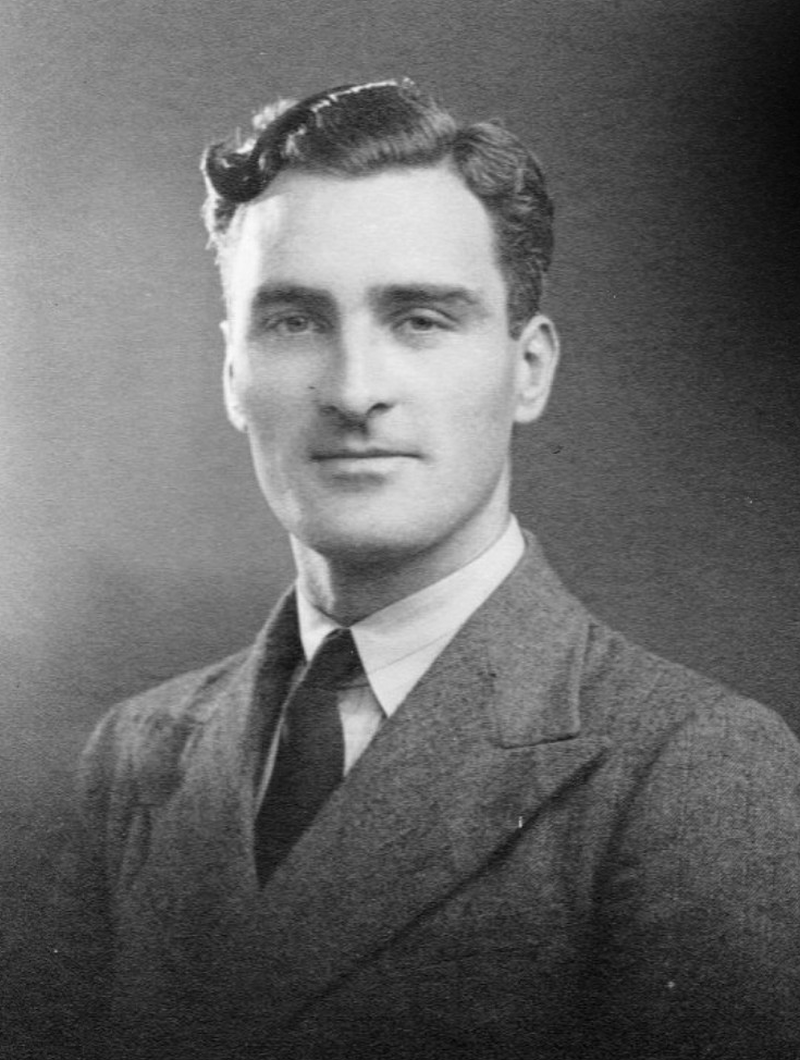
- Corish in 1949

Tánaiste
- In office 14 March 1973 – 5 July 1977
- Taoiseach: Liam Cosgrave
- Preceded by: Erskine H. Childers
- Succeeded by: George Colley

Minister for Health
- In office 14 March 1973 – 5 July 1977
- Taoiseach: Liam Cosgrave
- Preceded by: Erskine Childers
- Succeeded by: Charles Haughey

Leader of the Labour Party
- In office 2 March 1960 – 26 June 1977
- Preceded by: William Norton
- Succeeded by: Frank Cluskey

Minister for Social Welfare
- In office 14 March 1973 – 5 July 1977
- Taoiseach: Liam Cosgrave
- Preceded by: Joseph Brennan
- Succeeded by: Charles Haughey
- In office 2 June 1954 – 20 March 1957
- Taoiseach: John A. Costello
- Preceded by: James Ryan
- Succeeded by: Paddy Smith

Parliamentary Secretary
- 1948–1951: Defence
- 1948–1951: Local Government

Teachta Dála
- In office December 1945 – February 1982
- Constituency: Wexford

Personal details
- Born: 19 November 1918 Wexford, County Wexford, Ireland
- Died: 17 February 1990 (aged 71) Wexford, Ireland
- Party: Labour Party
- Spouse: Phyllis Donohoe (m. 1949)
- Children: 3

Brendan Corish (19 November 1918 – 17 February 1990) was an Irish Labour Party politician who served as Tánaiste and Minister for Health from 1973 to 1977, Leader of the Labour Party, Minister for Social Welfare from 1954 to 1957 and from 1973 to 1977, Parliamentary Secretary to the Minister for Defence and Parliamentary Secretary to the Minister for Local Government from 1948 to 1951. He was a Teachta Dála (TD) from 1945 to 1982.

== Early and personal life ==
He was born at William Street in Wexford town. His father, Richard Corish, a well-known trade union official and Sinn Féin member, had been elected to the Second Dáil shortly after the birth of his son and later joined the Labour Party, serving as a local and national politician until his death in 1945. His mother was Catherine Bergin.

He was educated locally at Wexford CBS and, in his youth, was a member of the 2nd Wexford Scout troop (Scouting Ireland). At the age of nineteen, he joined the clerical staff of Wexford County Council.

He was married to Phyllis, and they had three sons.

He spent several years playing Gaelic football for the Wexford county team.

== Political career ==
Corish was elected to Dáil Éireann as a Labour Party candidate in the Wexford by-election in 1945, necessitated by the death of his father who was the sitting TD. He took a seat on the fractured opposition benches, as Fianna Fáil's grip on power continued.

He retained his seat at the 1948 general election in which Fianna Fáil was returned as the largest party in the Dáil once again. However, Fine Gael, the Labour Party, the National Labour Party, Clann na Poblachta, Clann na Talmhan and a number of Independent candidates all came together to form the first inter-party government. Corish was appointed Parliamentary Secretary to the Ministers for Defence and Local Government.

When the second inter-party government was formed after the 1954 general election, Corish was appointed Minister for Social Welfare.

In 1960 Corish succeeded William Norton as Labour Party leader. He introduced new policies which made the party more socialist in outlook and described the party program as Christian socialist. Corish considered that the party principles were those endorsed by Pope John XXIII and greatly admired the Pope who he said was "one of the greatest contributors of all changes in Irish attitudes". However, the party moved carefully because 'socialism' was still considered a dirty word in 1960s Ireland. Corish claimed that Ireland would be 'Socialist in the Seventies'. To a certain extent he was right because Fine Gael and the Labour Party formed a coalition government between 1973 and 1977. Corish became Tánaiste and Minister for Health and Social Welfare. A wide range of social security benefits were introduced during Corish's time as a government minister, including a Deserted Wife's Benefit and Unmarried Mother's Allowance, Prisoner's Wife's Allowance, Single Woman's Allowance, and the Supplementary Welfare Allowance, providing supplementary income to individuals and families with low incomes. In 1974, compulsory social insurance was extended to virtually all employees, and that same year short-term social insurance benefits (occupational injury, maternity, unemployment and sickness benefits) became partially index-linked. According to one study, this signalled "an extension in the function of the income maintenance system from basic income support to proportional replacement of market earnings for some groups." The replacement of the existing flat-rate unemployment benefit with an earnings-related benefit meant that the average unemployment replacement rate went up from about 30% to 60%.

Corish was deeply religious, telling the Dáil in 1953 that "I am an Irishman second, I am a catholic first...if the hierarchy give me any direction with regard to catholic social teaching or catholic moral teaching, I accept without qualification in all respects the teaching of the hierarchy and the church to which I belong".

In 1977, the Taoiseach Liam Cosgrave called a general election, and Fianna Fáil was returned to power in a landslide victory. Corish resigned as leader of the Labour Party, having signalled his intent to do so before the election. He was succeeded as party leader by Frank Cluskey. Corish retired from politics completely at the February 1982 general election.

== Death ==
Brendan Corish died on 17 February 1990 in Wexford at the age of 71.

== Works ==
- The New Republic (February 1968)

Political offices
Preceded by Eamon Kissane	Parliamentary Secretary to the Minister for Defence; 1948–1951	Succeeded by Donnchadh Ó Briain
Preceded by Erskine H. Childers	Parliamentary Secretary to the Minister for Local Government; 1948–1951	Office abolished
Preceded by James Ryan	Minister for Social Welfare; 1954–1957	Succeeded by Paddy Smith
Preceded by Erskine H. Childers	Tánaiste; 1973–1977	Succeeded by George Colley
Preceded by Pádraig Faulkner	Minister for Health; 1973–1977	Succeeded by Charles Haughey
Preceded by Joseph Brennan	Minister for Social Welfare; 1973–1977	Succeeded by Charles Haughey
Party political offices
Preceded by William Norton	Leader of the Labour Party; 1960–1977	Succeeded by Frank Cluskey

Dáil	Election	Deputy (Party)	Deputy (Party)	Deputy (Party)	Deputy (Party)	Deputy (Party)
2nd	1921	Richard Corish (SF)	James Ryan (SF)	Séamus Doyle (SF)	Seán Etchingham (SF)	4 seats 1921–1923
3rd	1922	Richard Corish (Lab)	Daniel O'Callaghan (Lab)	Séamus Doyle (AT-SF)	Michael Doyle (FP)	4 seats 1921–1923
4th	1923	Richard Corish (Lab)	James Ryan (Rep)	Robert Lambert (Rep)	Michael Doyle (FP)	Osmond Esmonde (CnaG)
5th	1927 (Jun)	Richard Corish (Lab)	James Ryan (FF)	James Shannon (Lab)	Michael Doyle (FP)	John Keating (NL)
6th	1927 (Sep)	Richard Corish (Lab)	James Ryan (FF)	Denis Allen (FF)	Michael Jordan (FP)	Osmond Esmonde (CnaG)
7th	1932	Richard Corish (Lab)	James Ryan (FF)	Denis Allen (FF)	John Keating (CnaG)	Osmond Esmonde (CnaG)
8th	1933	Richard Corish (Lab)	James Ryan (FF)	Patrick Kehoe (FF)	John Keating (CnaG)	Osmond Esmonde (CnaG)
8th	1936 by-election	Richard Corish (Lab)	James Ryan (FF)	Patrick Kehoe (FF)	John Keating (CnaG)	Denis Allen (FF)
9th	1937	Richard Corish (Lab)	James Ryan (FF)	John Keating (FG)	John Esmonde (FG)	Denis Allen (FF)
10th	1938	Richard Corish (Lab)	James Ryan (FF)	John Keating (FG)	John Esmonde (FG)	Denis Allen (FF)
11th	1943	Richard Corish (Lab)	James Ryan (FF)	John O'Leary (Lab)	John Esmonde (FG)	Denis Allen (FF)
12th	1944	Richard Corish (Lab)	James Ryan (FF)	John O'Leary (NLP)	John Keating (FG)	Denis Allen (FF)
12th	1945 by-election	Brendan Corish (Lab)	James Ryan (FF)	John O'Leary (NLP)	John Keating (FG)	Denis Allen (FF)
13th	1948	Brendan Corish (Lab)	James Ryan (FF)	John O'Leary (NLP)	John Esmonde (FG)	Denis Allen (FF)
14th	1951	Brendan Corish (Lab)	James Ryan (FF)	John O'Leary (Lab)	Anthony Esmonde (FG)	Denis Allen (FF)
15th	1954	Brendan Corish (Lab)	James Ryan (FF)	John O'Leary (Lab)	Anthony Esmonde (FG)	Denis Allen (FF)
16th	1957	Brendan Corish (Lab)	James Ryan (FF)	Seán Browne (FF)	Anthony Esmonde (FG)	Denis Allen (FF)
17th	1961	Brendan Corish (Lab)	James Ryan (FF)	Lorcan Allen (FF)	Anthony Esmonde (FG)	4 seats 1961–1981
18th	1965	Brendan Corish (Lab)	James Kennedy (FF)	Lorcan Allen (FF)	Anthony Esmonde (FG)	4 seats 1961–1981
19th	1969	Brendan Corish (Lab)	Seán Browne (FF)	Lorcan Allen (FF)	Anthony Esmonde (FG)	4 seats 1961–1981
20th	1973	Brendan Corish (Lab)	Seán Browne (FF)	Lorcan Allen (FF)	John Esmonde (FG)	4 seats 1961–1981
21st	1977	Brendan Corish (Lab)	Seán Browne (FF)	Lorcan Allen (FF)	Michael D'Arcy (FG)	4 seats 1961–1981
22nd	1981	Brendan Corish (Lab)	Ivan Yates (FG)	Lorcan Allen (FF)	Michael D'Arcy (FG)	Hugh Byrne (FF)
23rd	1982 (Feb)	Seán Browne (FF)	Ivan Yates (FG)	Lorcan Allen (FF)	Michael D'Arcy (FG)	Hugh Byrne (FF)
24th	1982 (Nov)	Avril Doyle (FG)	Ivan Yates (FG)	John Browne (FF)	Michael D'Arcy (FG)	Hugh Byrne (FF)
25th	1987	Avril Doyle (FG)	Ivan Yates (FG)	John Browne (FF)	Brendan Howlin (Lab)	Hugh Byrne (FF)
26th	1989	Michael D'Arcy (FG)	Ivan Yates (FG)	John Browne (FF)	Brendan Howlin (Lab)	Séamus Cullimore (FF)
27th	1992	Avril Doyle (FG)	Ivan Yates (FG)	John Browne (FF)	Brendan Howlin (Lab)	Hugh Byrne (FF)
28th	1997	Michael D'Arcy (FG)	Ivan Yates (FG)	John Browne (FF)	Brendan Howlin (Lab)	Hugh Byrne (FF)
29th	2002	Paul Kehoe (FG)	Liam Twomey (Ind.)	John Browne (FF)	Brendan Howlin (Lab)	Tony Dempsey (FF)
30th	2007	Paul Kehoe (FG)	Michael W. D'Arcy (FG)	John Browne (FF)	Brendan Howlin (Lab)	Seán Connick (FF)
31st	2011	Paul Kehoe (FG)	Liam Twomey (FG)	John Browne (FF)	Brendan Howlin (Lab)	Mick Wallace (Ind.)
32nd	2016	Paul Kehoe (FG)	Michael W. D'Arcy (FG)	James Browne (FF)	Brendan Howlin (Lab)	Mick Wallace (I4C)
32nd	2019 by-election	Paul Kehoe (FG)	Michael W. D'Arcy (FG)	James Browne (FF)	Brendan Howlin (Lab)	Malcolm Byrne (FF)
33rd	2020	Paul Kehoe (FG)	Verona Murphy (Ind.)	James Browne (FF)	Brendan Howlin (Lab)	Johnny Mythen (SF)
34th	2024	4 seats since 2024	Verona Murphy (Ind.)	James Browne (FF)	George Lawlor (Lab)	Johnny Mythen (SF)
