= Richard Corish =

Irish politician (1886–1945)

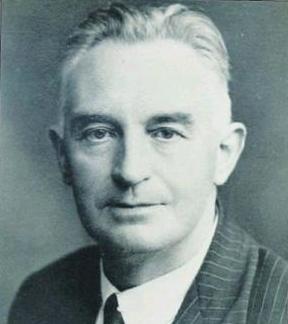
- Corish, c.1930s

Teachta Dála
- In office May 1921 – 19 July 1945
- Constituency: Wexford

Mayor
- In office 1920–1945
- Constituency: Wexford

Personal details
- Born: 17 September 1886 Wexford, Ireland
- Died: 19 July 1945 (aged 58)
- Party: Labour Party
- Other political affiliations: Sinn Féin
- Spouse: Catherine Bergin (m. 1913)
- Children: 6, including Brendan
- Education: CBS Wexford

Richard Corish (17 September 1886 – 19 July 1945) was an Irish politician and trade unionist. His involvement in the Labour Party for over 25 years and his contribution to the development of Wexford Town has made Corish one of the key figures in Wexford's long history.

== Early and personal life ==
Born in Wexford on 17 September 1886, at 35 William Street, Corish was the eldest child of carpenter Peter Corish and Mary Murphy. He was educated by the Christian Brothers in the town on George's Street and left school at fourteen years old, which was not unusual at this time.

On 29 September 1913, at 27 years of age, he married Catherine Bergin; daughter of labourer Daniel Bergin. They had six children, including Brendan.

== Career and politics ==
He worked as a fitter in the Wexford Engineering foundry the Star Iron Works. It was in this job that he witnessed the poor working conditions that industrial workers had to face all over the country. Many people of Ireland felt that this needed to change and so, in 1909, James Larkin formed the Irish Transport and General Workers' Union (ITGWU). Many important figures joined the union including P. T. Daly, James Connolly and eventually Richard Corish himself who became a voice for the Wexford workers.

The Wexford lockout from 1911 to 1912 that ensued because of this union was the event that first brought public attention to Corish in his hometown. Wexford employers countered the ITGWU by locking out their employees. On a conciliation committee, Corish represented the workers of the town and became a leader of this local union. During the lockout, he was arrested, spending a night in jail, for expressing his anger to a recently employed non-union foundry worker.

When visiting Wexford to support the workers, ITGWU leader James Larkin and trusted members James Connolly and P. T. Daly were put up in the Corish household on William Street.

In February 1912, the dispute was resolved with the introduction of the Irish Foundry Workers' Union of which Corish was secretary until 1915. His career as a tradesman however was over as he was blacklisted by all employers. This new union was absorbed by the ITGWU two years later. Corish remained a respected figure in the town, especially by the foundry workers, and continued as secretary in the ITGWU until 1921.

He first took his seat in the Wexford Borough Council in January 1913, where he was given the title of 'Alderman'.

In May 1916, Corish was arrested after being suspected of having involvement in the Easter Rising and was imprisoned in Stafford, England until June later that year. He was often targeted because of his republican activism, receiving a life-threatening letter in 1920 regarding the killing of Royal Irish Constabulary officers.

Corish was first elected to Wexford County Council in 1920 and later that year was appointed mayor of the town.

He was an Irish Labour Party representative. However, as the Labour Party in the southern 26 counties, later the Irish Free State, chose not to contest the 1921 elections, Corish ran as a Sinn Féin candidate and was elected to Dáil Éireann for the Wexford constituency.

He supported the Anglo-Irish Treaty and voted in favour of it. He also ran as a member of the Labour Party at the 1922 general election. His involvement in the trade union movement and his clear speechgiving skills displayed during a visit from Michael Collins to Wexford Town that same year were what gave him a fighting chance in this election. He was elected and served in Dáil Éireann until his death in 1945.

He was a public supporter of the Garda Síochána, expressing his disagreement with the reductions in Garda pay and allowances in 1924 and 1929.

Corish was a member of the governing body of University College Dublin as well as the Irish National Foresters, and was its High Chief Ranger in 1942.

== Death and legacy ==
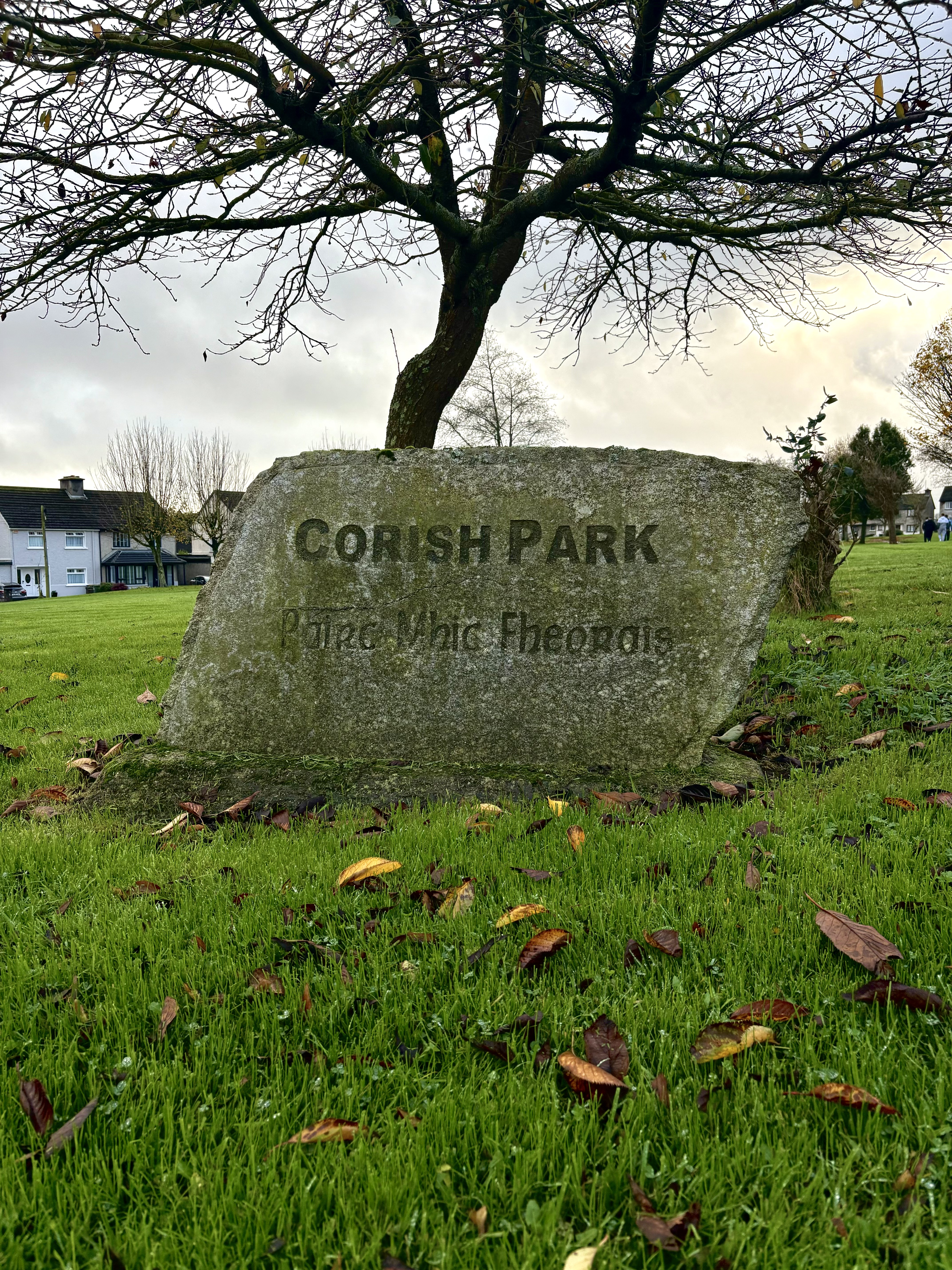
Corish Park in Wexford, a housing estate built in the 1950s named after Richard Corish.

He was a recipient of the Honorary Freedom of the Borough of Wexford in early 1945 and died later that year, after serving as mayor and council member for 25 years. During investigatory surgery for stomach pain, the doctors of Wexford County Hospital realised that his condition was much worse than imagined and he died shortly after. He was 58 years old. After appearing in the Dáil only a few days prior, Corish's death was unexpected.

His death caused a by-election to the Dáil which was won by his son, Brendan Corish, who was later a leader of the Labour Party and Tánaiste. He served as mayor up until his retirement in 1982. Another son, Des Corish, later also became mayor of the town. Corish's granddaughter, Helen Corish, was mayor in 1990.

Corish Park was built in his honour in the early 1950s.

Dáil	Election	Deputy (Party)	Deputy (Party)	Deputy (Party)	Deputy (Party)	Deputy (Party)
2nd	1921	Richard Corish (SF)	James Ryan (SF)	Séamus Doyle (SF)	Seán Etchingham (SF)	4 seats 1921–1923
3rd	1922	Richard Corish (Lab)	Daniel O'Callaghan (Lab)	Séamus Doyle (AT-SF)	Michael Doyle (FP)	4 seats 1921–1923
4th	1923	Richard Corish (Lab)	James Ryan (Rep)	Robert Lambert (Rep)	Michael Doyle (FP)	Osmond Esmonde (CnaG)
5th	1927 (Jun)	Richard Corish (Lab)	James Ryan (FF)	James Shannon (Lab)	Michael Doyle (FP)	John Keating (NL)
6th	1927 (Sep)	Richard Corish (Lab)	James Ryan (FF)	Denis Allen (FF)	Michael Jordan (FP)	Osmond Esmonde (CnaG)
7th	1932	Richard Corish (Lab)	James Ryan (FF)	Denis Allen (FF)	John Keating (CnaG)	Osmond Esmonde (CnaG)
8th	1933	Richard Corish (Lab)	James Ryan (FF)	Patrick Kehoe (FF)	John Keating (CnaG)	Osmond Esmonde (CnaG)
8th	1936 by-election	Richard Corish (Lab)	James Ryan (FF)	Patrick Kehoe (FF)	John Keating (CnaG)	Denis Allen (FF)
9th	1937	Richard Corish (Lab)	James Ryan (FF)	John Keating (FG)	John Esmonde (FG)	Denis Allen (FF)
10th	1938	Richard Corish (Lab)	James Ryan (FF)	John Keating (FG)	John Esmonde (FG)	Denis Allen (FF)
11th	1943	Richard Corish (Lab)	James Ryan (FF)	John O'Leary (Lab)	John Esmonde (FG)	Denis Allen (FF)
12th	1944	Richard Corish (Lab)	James Ryan (FF)	John O'Leary (NLP)	John Keating (FG)	Denis Allen (FF)
12th	1945 by-election	Brendan Corish (Lab)	James Ryan (FF)	John O'Leary (NLP)	John Keating (FG)	Denis Allen (FF)
13th	1948	Brendan Corish (Lab)	James Ryan (FF)	John O'Leary (NLP)	John Esmonde (FG)	Denis Allen (FF)
14th	1951	Brendan Corish (Lab)	James Ryan (FF)	John O'Leary (Lab)	Anthony Esmonde (FG)	Denis Allen (FF)
15th	1954	Brendan Corish (Lab)	James Ryan (FF)	John O'Leary (Lab)	Anthony Esmonde (FG)	Denis Allen (FF)
16th	1957	Brendan Corish (Lab)	James Ryan (FF)	Seán Browne (FF)	Anthony Esmonde (FG)	Denis Allen (FF)
17th	1961	Brendan Corish (Lab)	James Ryan (FF)	Lorcan Allen (FF)	Anthony Esmonde (FG)	4 seats 1961–1981
18th	1965	Brendan Corish (Lab)	James Kennedy (FF)	Lorcan Allen (FF)	Anthony Esmonde (FG)	4 seats 1961–1981
19th	1969	Brendan Corish (Lab)	Seán Browne (FF)	Lorcan Allen (FF)	Anthony Esmonde (FG)	4 seats 1961–1981
20th	1973	Brendan Corish (Lab)	Seán Browne (FF)	Lorcan Allen (FF)	John Esmonde (FG)	4 seats 1961–1981
21st	1977	Brendan Corish (Lab)	Seán Browne (FF)	Lorcan Allen (FF)	Michael D'Arcy (FG)	4 seats 1961–1981
22nd	1981	Brendan Corish (Lab)	Ivan Yates (FG)	Lorcan Allen (FF)	Michael D'Arcy (FG)	Hugh Byrne (FF)
23rd	1982 (Feb)	Seán Browne (FF)	Ivan Yates (FG)	Lorcan Allen (FF)	Michael D'Arcy (FG)	Hugh Byrne (FF)
24th	1982 (Nov)	Avril Doyle (FG)	Ivan Yates (FG)	John Browne (FF)	Michael D'Arcy (FG)	Hugh Byrne (FF)
25th	1987	Avril Doyle (FG)	Ivan Yates (FG)	John Browne (FF)	Brendan Howlin (Lab)	Hugh Byrne (FF)
26th	1989	Michael D'Arcy (FG)	Ivan Yates (FG)	John Browne (FF)	Brendan Howlin (Lab)	Séamus Cullimore (FF)
27th	1992	Avril Doyle (FG)	Ivan Yates (FG)	John Browne (FF)	Brendan Howlin (Lab)	Hugh Byrne (FF)
28th	1997	Michael D'Arcy (FG)	Ivan Yates (FG)	John Browne (FF)	Brendan Howlin (Lab)	Hugh Byrne (FF)
29th	2002	Paul Kehoe (FG)	Liam Twomey (Ind.)	John Browne (FF)	Brendan Howlin (Lab)	Tony Dempsey (FF)
30th	2007	Paul Kehoe (FG)	Michael W. D'Arcy (FG)	John Browne (FF)	Brendan Howlin (Lab)	Seán Connick (FF)
31st	2011	Paul Kehoe (FG)	Liam Twomey (FG)	John Browne (FF)	Brendan Howlin (Lab)	Mick Wallace (Ind.)
32nd	2016	Paul Kehoe (FG)	Michael W. D'Arcy (FG)	James Browne (FF)	Brendan Howlin (Lab)	Mick Wallace (I4C)
32nd	2019 by-election	Paul Kehoe (FG)	Michael W. D'Arcy (FG)	James Browne (FF)	Brendan Howlin (Lab)	Malcolm Byrne (FF)
33rd	2020	Paul Kehoe (FG)	Verona Murphy (Ind.)	James Browne (FF)	Brendan Howlin (Lab)	Johnny Mythen (SF)
34th	2024	4 seats since 2024	Verona Murphy (Ind.)	James Browne (FF)	George Lawlor (Lab)	Johnny Mythen (SF)
