= 2020 Labour Party leadership election (Ireland) =

- 15 February – 3 April 2020
- Turnout: 1,916 (87.0%)
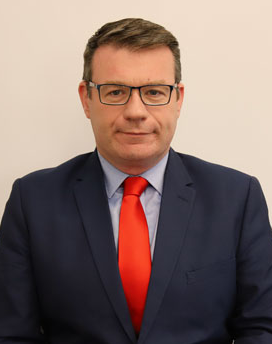

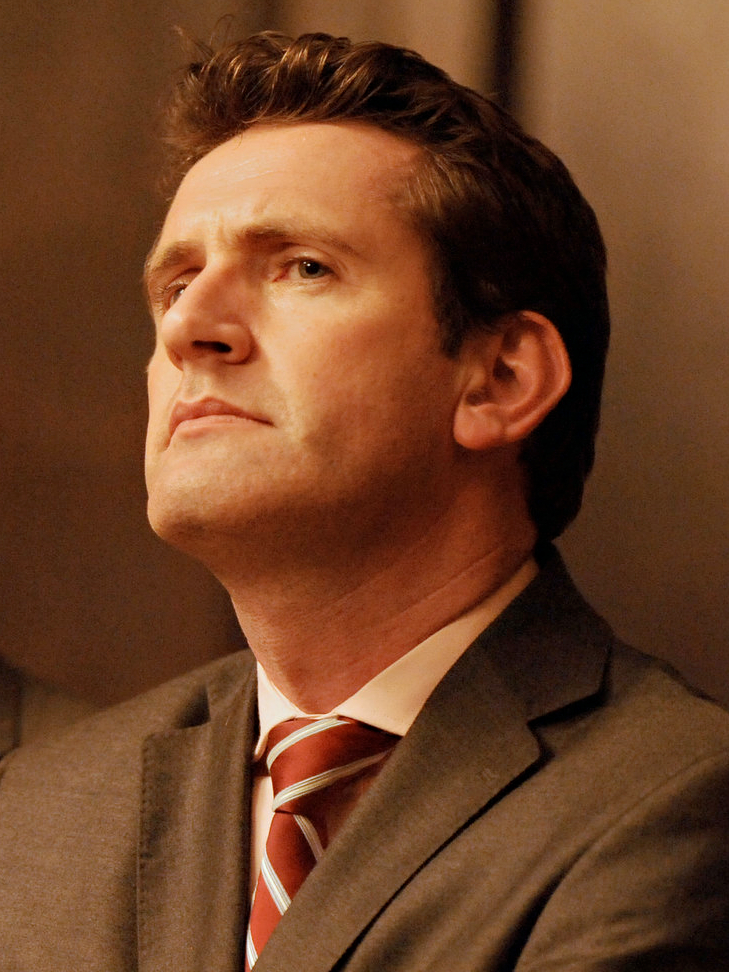
Candidate	Alan Kelly	Aodhán Ó Ríordáin
Popular vote	1,047	868
Percentage	54.7%	45.3%
Leader before election
Brendan Howlin
Elected Leader
Alan Kelly

The 2020 Labour Party leadership election was a leadership election within Ireland's Labour Party that was triggered when Brendan Howlin stepped down as Labour leader on 12 February 2020, in the aftermath of the party's poor showing at the 2020 general election.

The election was won by Alan Kelly who received 55% of the votes cast.

== Background ==
Brendan Howlin was elected unopposed as Labour Party leader in a 2016 leadership election. While Labour had a modest gain of six seats in the 2019 local elections, it lost one seat in the 2020 general election, resulting in the party having its lowest ever number of seats in Dáil Éireann with just six TDs elected. Howlin subsequently announced that he would resign as Labour leader stating that it had been "an honour" to lead the party but feels it is time to step down.

== Procedure ==
The Labour Party Executive Board met in the Gresham Hotel in Dublin on 15 February to agree on the rules for the contest. Only party TDs were eligible for the post of leader, and candidates must have been nominated by either two TDs (they could nominate themselves) or five constituency councils. All members of the party had a vote, provided they had been a paid-up party member since 28 August 2018.

Postal ballot papers were sent to Labour members on 15 March and the closing date for returning votes was on 3 April. A voter had to be a fully paid-up member for 21 days before polling day - meaning the last day they could sign up was 13 March.

== Candidates ==
=== Confirmed ===
Candidate	Born	Political office	Nominated by	Announced
Alan Kelly	13 July 1975 (age 50); Portroe, County Tipperary	TD for Tipperary (2016–present); TD for Tipperary North (2011–16); Deputy leader of the Labour Party (2014–16); Minister for the Environment, Community and Local Government (2014–16); Minister of State at the Department of Transport, Tourism and Sport (2011–14); MEP for South (2009–11); Senator (2007–09)	Duncan Smith; Seán Sherlock	18 February 2020
Aodhán Ó Ríordáin	22 July 1976 (age 49); Dublin	TD for Dublin Bay North (2020–2024); Senator (2016–20); Minister of State at the Department of Health (2015–16); Minister of State at the Department of Justice and Equality (2014–16); TD for Dublin North-Central (2011–16)	Ged Nash; Ivana Bacik	18 February 2020

=== Declined ===
The following individuals were discussed in the media as potential leadership candidates, but did not stand:

- Seán Sherlock, TD for Cork East, former Minister of State (endorsed Kelly)
- Ged Nash, TD for Louth, former Minister of State (endorsed Ó Ríordáin)

== Debates ==
Several hustings events and public debates were scheduled to take place throughout the leadership campaign; however, as a result of the COVID-19 situation, the Labour Party canceled the remaining hustings in Galway and Dublin.

Date	Location
2 March 2020	Clayton Hotel Silver Springs, Cork
5 March 2020	Clayton Hotel, Dublin Airport
9 March 2020	Mullingar Park Hotel, Mullingar
