= Government of the 31st Dáil =

Government of Ireland 2011 to 2016

29th government of Ireland
- Government of Ireland

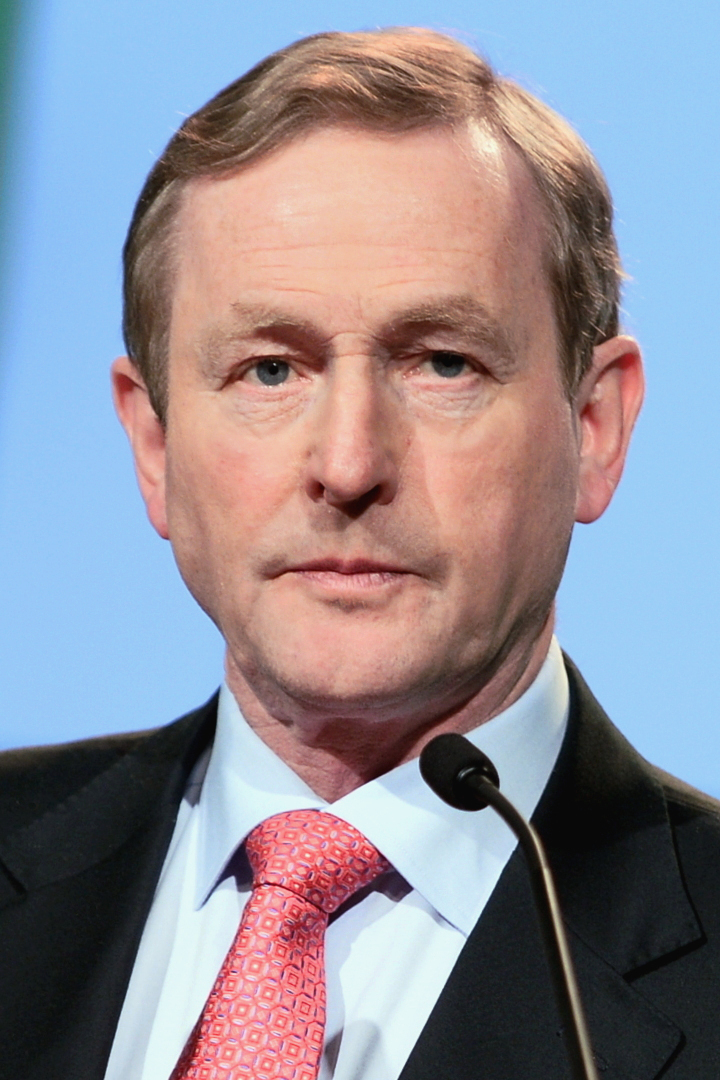
- Date formed: 9 March 2011
- Date dissolved: 6 May 2016

People and organisations
- President: Mary McAleese (2011); Michael D. Higgins (2011–2016)
- Taoiseach: Enda Kenny
- Tánaiste: Eamon Gilmore (2011–2014); Joan Burton (2014–2016)
- No. of ministers: 15
- Member parties: Fine Gael; Labour
- Status in legislature: Majority coalition
- Opposition cabinet: First Martin front bench
- Opposition party: Fianna Fáil
- Opposition leader: Micheál Martin

History
- Outgoing formation: 2016 government formation
- Election: 2011 general election
- Legislature terms: 31st Dáil; 24th Seanad
- Budgets: 2012; 2013; 2014; 2015; 2016
- Predecessor: 28th government
- Successor: 30th government

The 29th government of Ireland (9 March 2011 – 6 May 2016) was the government of Ireland which was formed following the 2011 general election to the 31st Dáil on 25 February 2011. It was a coalition government of Fine Gael and the Labour Party led by Enda Kenny as Taoiseach. From 2011 to 2014, Labour Party leader Eamon Gilmore served as Tánaiste, and from 2014 to 2016, the new Labour leader Joan Burton served as Tánaiste.

It lasted 5 years, 1 day from its appointment until its resignation, and continued to carry out its duties for a further 57 days until the appointment of the successor government, giving a total of 5 years, 58 days in office.

== Nomination of Taoiseach ==
The 31st Dáil first met on 9 March 2011. In the debate on the nomination of Taoiseach, only Fine Gael leader Enda Kenny was proposed. This proposal was carried with 117 votes in favour and 27 votes against, the greatest number of votes cast in the Dáil in favour of the nomination of a candidate for Taoiseach. Kenny was appointed as Taoiseach by president Mary McAleese.

9 March 2011; Nomination of Enda Kenny (FG) as Taoiseach; Motion proposed by Simon Harris and seconded by Ciara Conway; Absolute majority: 84/166
Vote	Parties	Votes
Yes	Fine Gael (76), Labour Party (37), Independent (5)	117 / 166
No	Sinn Féin (14), Independent (8), People Before Profit (2), Socialist Party (2), Workers and Unemployed Action (1)	27 / 166
Not voting	Fianna Fáil (20), Ceann Comhairle (1), Independent (1)	22 / 166

== Government ministers ==
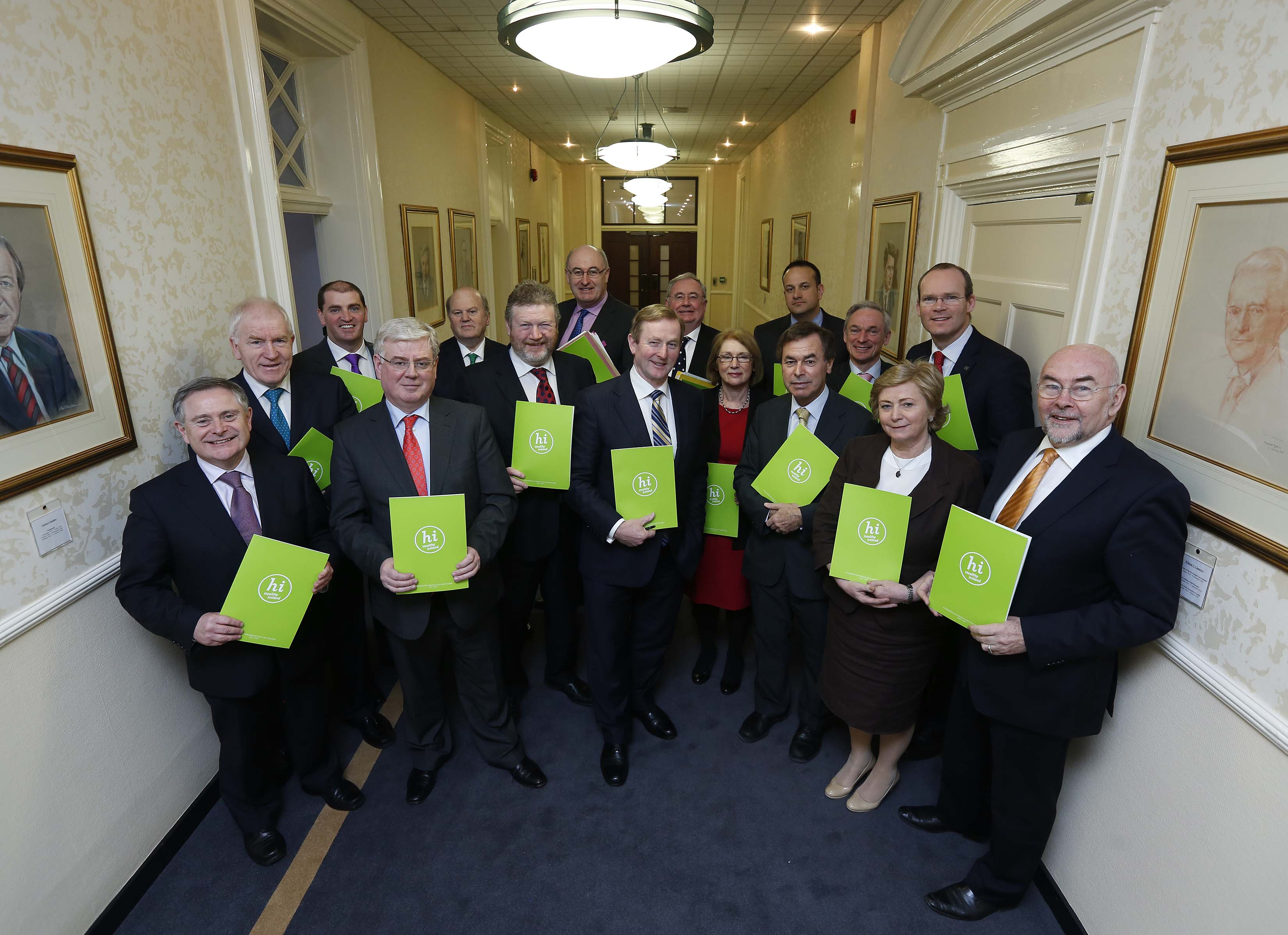
Members of the Government of the 31st Dáil

After his appointment by the president, Enda Kenny proposed the members of the government and they were approved by the Dáil.

Office	Name	Term	Party
Taoiseach	Enda Kenny	2011–2016	Fine Gael
Tánaiste	Eamon Gilmore	2011–2014	Labour
Minister for Foreign Affairs (Note: The Department of Foreign Affairs was renamed the Department of Foreign Affairs and Trade on 2 June 2011.)	Eamon Gilmore	2011–2014	Labour
Minister for Finance	Michael Noonan	2011–2016	Fine Gael
Minister for Education and Skills	Ruairi Quinn	2011–2014	Labour
Minister for Public Expenditure and Reform (Note: The Department of Public Expenditure and Reform was established on 6 July 2011.)	Brendan Howlin	2011–2016	Labour
Minister for Jobs, Enterprise and Innovation (Note: The Department of Enterprise, Trade and Innovation was renamed the Department of Jobs, Enterprise and Innovation on 2 June 2011.)	Richard Bruton	2011–2016	Fine Gael
Minister for Social Protection	Joan Burton	2011–2016	Labour
Minister for Arts, Heritage and the Gaeltacht (Note: The Department of Tourism, Culture and Sport was renamed the Department of Arts, Heritage and the Gaeltacht on 2 June 2011.)	Jimmy Deenihan	2011–2014	Fine Gael
Minister for Communications, Energy and Natural Resources	Pat Rabbitte	2011–2014	Labour
Minister for the Environment, Community and Local Government (Note: The Department of Environment, Heritage and Local Government was renamed the Department of the Environment, Community and Local Government on 2 May 2011.)	Phil Hogan	2011–2014	Fine Gael
Minister for Justice and Equality (Note: The Department of Justice and Law Reform was renamed the Department of Justice and Equality on 2 April 2011.)	Alan Shatter	2011–2014	Fine Gael
Minister for Defence	Alan Shatter	2011–2014	Fine Gael
Minister for Agriculture, Food and the Marine (Note: The Department of Agriculture, Fisheries and Food was renamed the Department of Agriculture, Food and the Marine on 17 October 2011.)	Simon Coveney	2011–2016	Fine Gael
Minister for Children and Youth Affairs (Note: The Department of Community, Equality and Gaeltacht Affairs was renamed the Department of Children and Youth Affairs on 2 June 2011.)	Frances Fitzgerald	2011–2014	Fine Gael
Minister for Health (Note: The Department of Health and Children was renamed the Department of Health on 4 June 2011.)	James Reilly	2011–2014	Fine Gael
Minister for Transport, Tourism and Sport (Note: The Department of Transport was renamed the Department of Transport, Tourism and Sport on 2 April 2011.)	Leo Varadkar	2011–2014	Fine Gael
=== Changes 8 May 2014 === Following the resignation of Alan Shatter on 7 May.
Minister for Justice and Equality	Frances Fitzgerald	2014–2016	Fine Gael
Minister for Defence	Enda Kenny (acting)	2014	Fine Gael
Minister for Children and Youth Affairs	Charles Flanagan	2014	Fine Gael
=== Changes 11 July 2014 === Following the election of Joan Burton as leader of the Labour Party, Eamon Gilmore, Pat Rabbitte and Ruairi Quinn resigned from cabinet. Phil Hogan resigned on his nomination as European Commissioner.
Tánaiste	Joan Burton	2014–2016	Labour
Minister for Defence	Simon Coveney	2014–2016	Fine Gael
Minister for Children and Youth Affairs	James Reilly	2014–2016	Fine Gael
Minister for Health	Leo Varadkar	2014–2016	Fine Gael
Minister for Foreign Affairs and Trade	Charles Flanagan	2014–2016	Fine Gael
Minister for Communications, Energy and Natural Resources	Alex White	2014–2016	Labour
Minister for Education and Skills	Jan O'Sullivan	2014–2016	Labour
Minister for the Environment, Community and Local Government	Alan Kelly	2014–2016	Labour
Minister for Transport, Tourism and Sport	Paschal Donohoe	2014–2016	Fine Gael
Minister for Arts, Heritage and the Gaeltacht	Heather Humphreys	2014–2016	Fine Gael

Changes to departments

== Attorney General ==
On 9 March 2011, Máire Whelan SC was appointed as Attorney General by the president on the nomination of the Taoiseach.

== Ministers of state ==
On 9 March 2011, Paul Kehoe and Willie Penrose were appointed by the government on the nomination of the Taoiseach as ministers of state who would attend cabinet without a vote. On 10 March 2011, the government on the nomination of the Taoiseach appointed 13 further ministers of state.

Name	Department(s)	Responsibility	Term	Party
Paul Kehoe (In attendance at cabinet)	Taoiseach; Defence	Government Chief Whip; Defence	2011–2016	Fine Gael
Willie Penrose (In attendance at cabinet)	Environment, Community and Local Government	Housing and Planning	2011	Labour
Dinny McGinley	Arts, Heritage and the Gaeltacht	Gaeltacht Affairs	2011–2014	Fine Gael
Róisín Shortall	Health	Primary care	2011–2012	Labour
John Perry	Jobs, Enterprise and Innovation	Small Business	2011–2014	Fine Gael
Michael Ring	Transport, Tourism and Sport	Tourism and Sport	2011–2016	Fine Gael
Jan O'Sullivan	Foreign Affairs and Trade	Trade and Development	2011	Labour
Kathleen Lynch	Justice and Equality; Health	Disability, Equality and Mental Health	2011–2014	Labour
Fergus O'Dowd	Environment, Community and Local Government; Communications, Energy and Natural Resources	NewERA Project	2011–2014	Fine Gael
Brian Hayes	Public Expenditure and Reform; Finance	Public Service Reform and the Office of Public Works	2011–2014	Fine Gael
Shane McEntee	Agriculture, Food and the Marine	Food, Horticulture and Food Safety	2011–2012	Fine Gael
Lucinda Creighton	Taoiseach; Foreign Affairs and Trade	European Affairs	2011–2013	Fine Gael
Seán Sherlock	Jobs, Enterprise and Innovation; Education and Skills	Research and Innovation	2011–2014	Labour
Ciarán Cannon	Education and Skills	Training and Skills	2011–2014	Fine Gael
Alan Kelly	Transport, Tourism and Sport	Public and Commuter Transport	2011–2014	Labour
=== Changes on 20 December 2011 === Following the resignation of Willie Penrose on 15 November 2011.
Jan O'Sullivan (In attendance at cabinet)	Environment, Community and Local Government	Housing and Planning	2011–2014	Labour
Joe Costello	Foreign Affairs and Trade	Trade and Development	2011–2014	Labour
=== Change on 2 October 2012 === Following the resignation of Róisín Shortall on 26 September 2012.
Alex White	Health	Primary care	2012–2014	Labour
=== Change on 5 June 2013 === Following the death of Shane McEntee on 21 December 2012.
Tom Hayes	Agriculture, Food and the Marine	Forestry, Horticulture, the Greyhound Industry and Food Safety	2013–2016	Fine Gael
=== Change on 12 July 2013 === Following the resignation of Lucinda Creighton on 11 July 2013.
Paschal Donohoe	Taoiseach; Foreign Affairs and Trade	European Affairs	2013–2014	Fine Gael
=== Changes on 11 July 2014 === Following the appointment of Jan O'Sullivan to cabinet and the demotion of Jimmy Deenihan from cabinet.
Ged Nash (In attendance at cabinet)	Jobs, Enterprise and Innovation	Business and Employment	2014–2016	Labour
Jimmy Deenihan	Taoiseach; Foreign Affairs and Trade	Diaspora	2014–2016	Fine Gael
=== Changes on 15 July 2014 === Brian Hayes was elected as an MEP on 23 May. Dinny McGinley, John Perry, Fergus O'Dowd, Ciarán Cannon and Joe Costello resigned on the request of the party leaders to facilitate a wider reshuffle.
Kathleen Lynch	Health	Primary Care, Mental Health and Disability	2014–2016	Labour
Seán Sherlock	Foreign Affairs and Trade	Overseas Development Assistance, Trade Promotion and North/South Cooperation	2014–2016	Labour
Damien English	Education and Skills; Jobs, Enterprise and Innovation	Skills, Research and Innovation	2014–2016	Fine Gael
Joe McHugh	Arts, Heritage and the Gaeltacht; Communications, Energy and Natural Resources	Gaeltacht Affairs and Natural Resources	2014–2016	Fine Gael
Paudie Coffey	Environment, Community and Local Government	Housing, Planning and Construction 2020 Strategy	2014–2016	Fine Gael
Simon Harris	Finance; Public Expenditure and Reform; Taoiseach	Office of Public Works, Public Procurement and International Banking	2014–2016	Fine Gael
Kevin Humphreys	Social Protection	Employment, Community and Social Support	2014–2016	Labour
Dara Murphy	Taoiseach; Foreign Affairs and Trade; Justice and Equality	European Affairs and Data Protection	2014–2016	Fine Gael
Aodhán Ó Ríordáin	Justice and Equality; Arts, Heritage and the Gaeltacht	New communities, culture and equality	2014–2016	Labour
Ann Phelan	Agriculture, Food and the Marine; Transport, Tourism and Sport	Rural economic development and rural transport	2014–2016	Labour
=== Change on 22 April 2015 === Additional responsibilities.
Aodhán Ó Ríordáin	Health	Drugs strategy	2015–2016	Labour

== Economic Management Council ==
The Economic Management Council was a cabinet subcommittee of senior ministers formed to co-ordinate the response to the Irish financial crisis and the government's dealings with the troika of the European Commission, the European Central Bank and the International Monetary Fund. Its members were the Taoiseach, the Tánaiste, the Minister for Finance, and the Minister for Public Expenditure and Reform. It was supported by the Department of the Taoiseach, led by Dermot McCarthy. Brigid Laffan compared it to a war cabinet. Opposition parties suggested the Council represented a dangerous concentration of power.

Following the formation of a government in 2016, Shane Ross, an incoming member of the new 30th Government of Ireland, confirmed in the Dáil that the subcommittee would not form part of the new government. Ross told the Dáil on 6 May 2016: "I had a conversation last night with the Taoiseach. I was talking to him about Dáil reform and I asked him about an issue – a last point I had forgotten to ask about earlier – which was the abolition of the Economic Management Council. I thought it was going to be like one of these thorny topics which we had been through over the last few weeks. He told me okay, it is gone, that it had been needed for a particular time and it is not needed any more and I was to consider it gone. To me that was very encouraging because it meant that one of those obstacles to Dáil reform, one of those rather secretive bodies that had dictated to the Cabinet and to the Dáil the agenda of what came out to the country, was now a thing of the past."

== Budgets ==
The Minister for Finance, Michael Noonan, and the Minister for Public Expenditure and Reform, Brendan Howlin, delivered the following budgets:

- 2012 budget, on 5 and 6 December 2011
- 2013 budget, on 5 December 2012
- 2014 budget, on 15 October 2013
- 2015 budget, on 14 October 2014
- 2016 budget, on 13 October 2015

== Motions of confidence ==
On 18 September 2012, Fianna Fáil TD Billy Kelleher proposed a motion of no confidence in the Minister for Health, James Reilly. The debate was noted for the contribution on the second day of debate of Róisín Shortall, a Minister of State at the Department of Health, who voted with the government, but did not mention the minister. Following amendment, this was debated a motion commending the work of the minister, and was approved by a vote of 99 to 50. Those voting against the government included Tommy Broughan and Patrick Nulty, who had been elected as Labour Party TDs, and Denis Naughten, who had been elected as a Fine Gael TD and had left in protest at closure of services at the Roscommon University Hospital. Shortall resigned as a junior minister and from the Labour Parliamentary Party the following week.

On 11 December 2012, Sinn Féin TD Pearse Doherty proposed a motion of no confidence in the government, stating that it had "failed to fulfil its obligations to make political decisions and choices which benefit the citizens of this State". Brendan Howlin, the Minister for Public Expenditure and Reform, proposed an amendment such that the motion read, "That Dáil Éireann has confidence in the Government as it deals with the current economic crisis in as fair a manner as possible, while prioritising economic recovery and job creation". Debate continued the following day. The amended motion was carried by a vote of 88 to 51. Those voting against the government included Róisín Shortall.

On 1 April 2014, Fiann Fáil TD Niall Collins proposed a motion of no confidence in the Minister for Justice and Equality, Alan Shatter. Following amendment, this was debated a motion commending the work of the minister. Debate continued on 2 April, and the amended motion was carried by a vote of 95 to 51. This was just over a month before Shatter resigned on the submission of the Guerin Report to the Taoiseach.

On 9 December 2014, the Dáil debated a motion of confidence in the Taoiseach and in the government. This motion was proposed by Taoiseach Enda Kenny in response to a motion of no confidence proposed by Sinn Féin, which referred to "the widespread public opposition to domestic water charges and to Irish Water". The vote of confidence was carried by a vote of 86 to 55. Those voting against included Lucinda Creighton, Peter Mathews and Billy Timmins, who had been elected as Fine Gael TDs.

== Dissolution and resignation ==
On 3 February 2016, Taoiseach Enda Kenny sought a dissolution of the Dáil which was granted by the president, with the new Dáil to convene on 10 March. The general election took place on 26 February.

The 32nd Dáil first met on 10 March 2016. Enda Kenny, Fianna Fáil leader Micheál Martin, Sinn Féin leader Gerry Adams, and Richard Boyd Barrett of the Anti-Austerity Alliance–People Before Profit were each proposed for nomination as Taoiseach. None of the four motions were successful. Kenny announced that he would resign as Taoiseach but that under the provisions of Article 28.11 of the Constitution, the government would continue to carry out their duties until their successors were appointed. Kenny continued in this capacity until 6 May 2016, when he was again nominated for the appointment by the president to the position of Taoiseach and formed the 30th Government of Ireland.
