= 2013 Irish budget =

- Presented: 5 December 2012
- Parliament: 31st Dáil
- Government: 29th Government of Ireland
- Party: Fine Gael; Labour Party
- Minister for Finance: Michael Noonan (FG)
- Minister for Public Expenditure and Reform: Brendan Howlin (Lab)
- Website: Budget 2013

The 2013 Irish budget was the Irish Government budget for the 2013 fiscal year, presented to Dáil Éireann on 5 December 2012. It was the second budget of the 29th Government of Ireland.

The budget saw the introduction of the local property tax at rates of 0.18% per annum and 0.25% per annum. Child benefit will be cut by €10 a month with €61m cuts in other household benefits. College fees will also rise in the next year by €250 a student while motor tax will also increase. A packet of 20 cigarettes increases by 10-cent while excise duty on a pint or beer or cider will increase by 10-cent, on a standard measure of spirits by 10-cent, and on a bottle of wine by €1.

On 13 December 2012, Labour Party TD Colm Keaveney voted against the government on cuts to the respite care grant leading to his loss of the party whip.
