= 2016 Irish budget =

- Presented: 13 October 2015
- Parliament: 31st Dáil
- Government: 29th Government of Ireland
- Party: Fine Gael; Labour Party
- Minister for Finance: Michael Noonan (FG)
- Minister for Public Expenditure and Reform: Brendan Howlin (Lab)
- Website: Budget 2016

The 2016 Irish budget was the Irish Government budget for the 2016 fiscal year, which was presented to Dáil Éireann on 13 October 2015.

The Minister for Finance Michael Noonan outlined the taxation measures with Public Expenditure Minister Brendan Howlin detailing the spending.

Families were the big winners in the Budget, with a €5 increase in the monthly child benefit, free GP care for the under 12s and extra free pre-school childcare announced.

== Summary ==
- A pack of 20 cigarettes is to increase by 50 cent from midnight of the 13 October.
- The entry point to the USC will rise from €12,012 to €13,000
- Free pre-school childcare will be available for children from 3 years until they reach five and a half.
- The Christmas bonus for social welfare recipients restored to 75 per cent of the recipient's weekly payment.
- Old age pension will increase by €3 per week from January 2016.
- Child benefit to increase by €5 per month to €140 from January 2016.
- Fuel allowance will be increased by €2.50 per week to €22.50.
- 600 extra gardaí to be recruited.
- 2c charge every time cash is withdraw from an ATM using a debit card capped at €2.50 for ATM cards and €5 for combination ATM / debit cards.
- Minimum wage increased from €8.65 to €9.15 per hour from January 2016.
