= Seán Sherlock =

Irish former politician (born 1972)

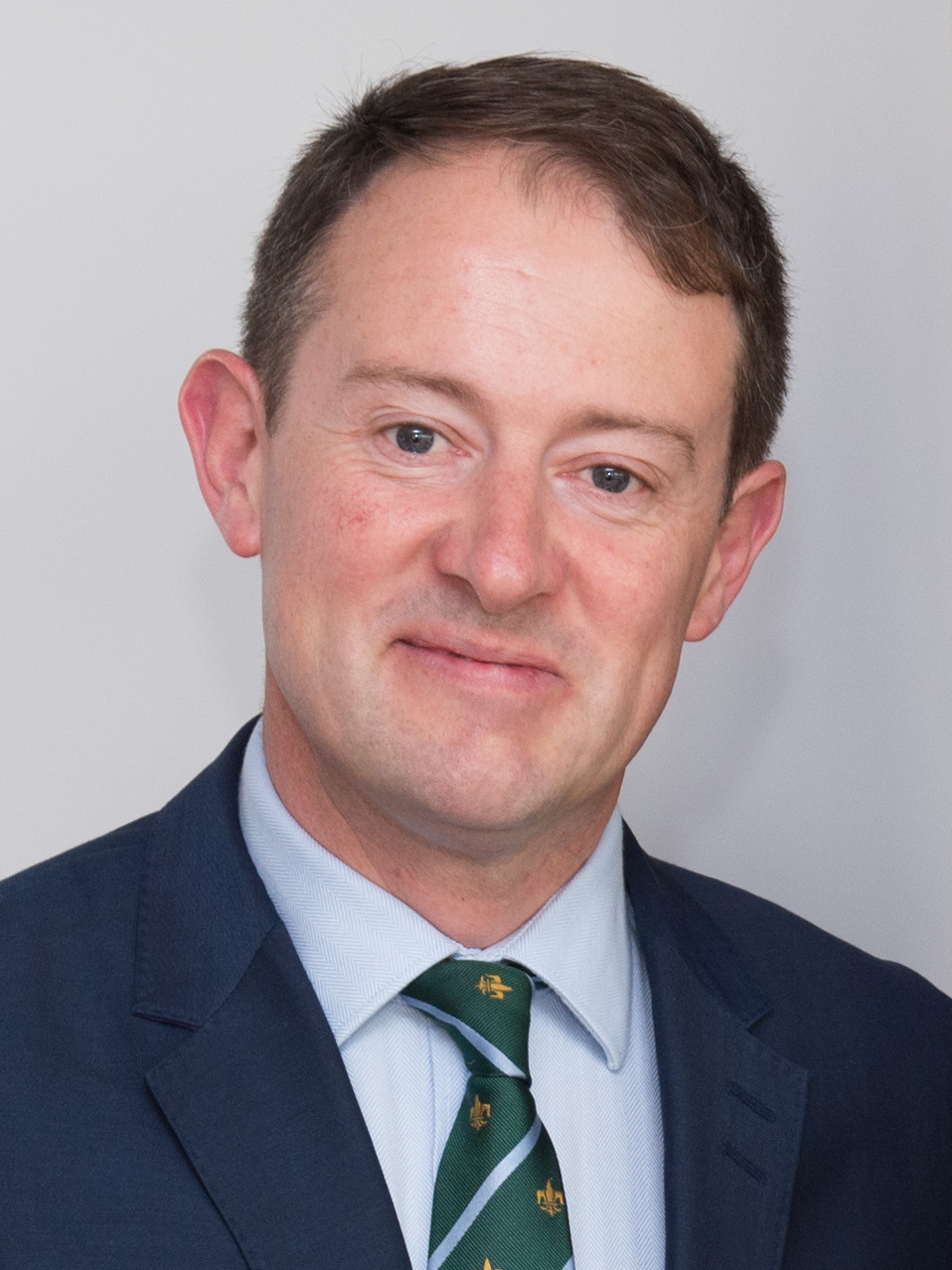
- Sherlock in 2015

Minister of State
- 2014–2016: Foreign Affairs and Trade
- 2011–2014: Jobs, Enterprise and Innovation
- 2011–2014: Education and Skills

Teachta Dála
- In office May 2007 – November 2024
- Constituency: Cork East

Personal details
- Born: 6 December 1972 (age 53) Cork, Ireland
- Party: Labour Party
- Spouse: Máire Ní Ríordáin (m. 2015)
- Children: 3
- Parent: Joe Sherlock (father)
- Relatives: Marie Sherlock (cousin)
- Education: University College Galway

Seán Sherlock (born 6 December 1972) is an Irish former Labour Party politician who served as a Teachta Dála (TD) for the Cork East constituency from 2007 to 2024. He served as a Minister of State from 2011 to 2016.

== Early life ==
Sherlock was born in Cork in 1972, but is a native of Mallow, County Cork. He is the son of Joe Sherlock, who at the time was an Official Sinn Féin member of Cork County Council. He was educated locally at St. Patrick's Boys' National School and the Patrician Academy, before later attending Cork College of Commerce. Sherlock subsequently studied at University College Galway, where he completed a degree in Economics and Politics.

== Political career ==
Sherlock first became directly involved in politics when he served a six-month internship with MEP Proinsias De Rossa, in his office at the European Parliament. Following the completion of his internship he was offered a full-time job working as an assistant to de Rossa.

In 2002, Sherlock served as election manager for his father in his attempt to win back a seat in the Cork East constituency at the general election as a Labour Party candidate. The campaign was successful; Joe Sherlock returned to Dáil Éireann after a ten-year absence.

The abolition of the dual mandate in 2003 meant that Joe Sherlock had to vacate his seats on Mallow Town Council and Cork County Council. Seán was co-opted onto both councils that year. The following year he won both seats in his own right when he was successful at the local elections. He was then elected Mayor of Mallow.

When Joe Sherlock announced that he would not be contesting the 2007 general election, Seán was selected to succeed him. He contested Cork East for the Labour Party and was elected. A Fianna Fáil-led government returned to office for the third successive election. Seán Sherlock was appointed Labour Party spokesperson on Agriculture and Food.

=== Minister of State ===
Sherlock retained his Dáil seat at the 2011 general election, topping the poll in Cork East. He was appointed by the new Fine Gael–Labour coalition government as Minister of State at the Department of Jobs, Enterprise and Innovation and at the Department of Education and Skills with special responsibility for Research and Innovation.

In January 2012, Sherlock proposed legislation to give copyright holders the right to seek an injunction against copyright violators. A group called "Stop SOPA Ireland" petitioned against the legislation, comparisons being made between these reforms and the Stop Online Piracy Act in the United States. Sherlock said such comparisons were "not based on fact". According to the Irish government the legislation was intended to close a loophole after a High Court case in 2010, in which EMI sued UPC, an internet service provider, over illegal downloads. A denial-of-service attack was performed against government websites in protest over the changes. On 29 February 2012, Sherlock signed the legislation, citing Ireland's "obligations under EU law". The legislation subsequently resulted in the blocking of The Pirate Bay in Ireland.

On 15 July 2014, he was appointed as Minister of State at the Department of Foreign Affairs and Trade with special responsibility for Overseas Development Aid, Trade Promotion and North–South Cooperation.

=== Return to opposition ===
Following the 2016 general election, Sherlock was one of seven remaining Labour TDs. He opposed returning to coalition with Fine Gael during the government formation talks that year. He continued to serve as a junior minister until the new government was formed on 6 May 2016. He was party spokesperson on Children and Youth Affairs and the Environment in the 32nd Dáil.

Sherlock was re-elected at the 2020 general election. When Brendan Howlin stood down as party leader in 2020, Sherlock ruled out contesting the Labour Party leadership election. He nominated Alan Kelly, who would defeat Aodhán Ó Ríordáin. In July 2020, Sherlock was appointed Labour Party spokesperson on Social Protection, Rural and Community Affairs and the Islands, including Agriculture and the Marine.

Following the redrawing of his constituency, Sherlock announced in October 2023 that he would not contest the 2024 general election.

== See also ==
- Families in the Oireachtas

Dáil	Election	Deputy (Party)	Deputy (Party)	Deputy (Party)	Deputy (Party)	Deputy (Party)
4th	1923	John Daly (Ind.)	Michael Hennessy (CnaG)	David Kent (Rep)	John Dinneen (FP)	Thomas O'Mahony (CnaG)
4th	1924 by-election	John Daly (Ind.)	Michael Hennessy (CnaG)	David Kent (Rep)	John Dinneen (FP)	Michael K. Noonan (CnaG)
5th	1927 (Jun)	John Daly (Ind.)	Michael Hennessy (CnaG)	David Kent (SF)	David O'Gorman (FP)	Martin Corry (FF)
6th	1927 (Sep)	John Daly (CnaG)	Michael Hennessy (CnaG)	William Kent (FF)	Edmond Carey (CnaG)	Martin Corry (FF)
7th	1932	John Daly (CnaG)	William Broderick (CnaG)	Brook Brasier (Ind.)	Patrick Murphy (FF)	Martin Corry (FF)
8th	1933	Patrick Daly (CnaG)	William Broderick (CnaG)	William Kent (NCP)	Patrick Murphy (FF)	Martin Corry (FF)
9th	1937	Constituency abolished				

Dáil	Election	Deputy (Party)	Deputy (Party)	Deputy (Party)
13th	1948	Martin Corry (FF)	Patrick O'Gorman (FG)	Seán Keane (Lab)
14th	1951	Martin Corry (FF)	Patrick O'Gorman (FG)	Seán Keane (Lab)
14th	1953 by-election	Martin Corry (FF)	Patrick O'Gorman (FG)	Richard Barry (FG)
15th	1954	Martin Corry (FF)	John Moher (FF)	Richard Barry (FG)
16th	1957	Martin Corry (FF)	John Moher (FF)	Richard Barry (FG)
17th	1961	Constituency abolished		

Dáil	Election	Deputy (Party)	Deputy (Party)	Deputy (Party)	Deputy (Party)
22nd	1981	Carey Joyce (FF)	Myra Barry (FG)	Patrick Hegarty (FG)	Joe Sherlock (SF–WP)
23rd	1982 (Feb)	Michael Ahern (FF)	Myra Barry (FG)	Patrick Hegarty (FG)	Joe Sherlock (SF–WP)
24th	1982 (Nov)	Michael Ahern (FF)	Myra Barry (FG)	Patrick Hegarty (FG)	Ned O'Keeffe (FF)
25th	1987	Michael Ahern (FF)	Joe Sherlock (WP)	Patrick Hegarty (FG)	Ned O'Keeffe (FF)
26th	1989	Michael Ahern (FF)	Joe Sherlock (WP)	Paul Bradford (FG)	Ned O'Keeffe (FF)
27th	1992	Michael Ahern (FF)	John Mulvihill (Lab)	Paul Bradford (FG)	Ned O'Keeffe (FF)
28th	1997	Michael Ahern (FF)	David Stanton (FG)	Paul Bradford (FG)	Ned O'Keeffe (FF)
29th	2002	Michael Ahern (FF)	David Stanton (FG)	Joe Sherlock (Lab)	Ned O'Keeffe (FF)
30th	2007	Michael Ahern (FF)	David Stanton (FG)	Seán Sherlock (Lab)	Ned O'Keeffe (FF)
31st	2011	Sandra McLellan (SF)	David Stanton (FG)	Seán Sherlock (Lab)	Tom Barry (FG)
32nd	2016	Pat Buckley (SF)	David Stanton (FG)	Seán Sherlock (Lab)	Kevin O'Keeffe (FF)
33rd	2020	Pat Buckley (SF)	David Stanton (FG)	Seán Sherlock (Lab)	James O'Connor (FF)
34th	2024	Pat Buckley (SF)	Noel McCarthy (FG)	Liam Quaide (SD)	James O'Connor (FF)
