= 2014 Irish budget =

- Presented: 15 October 2013
- Parliament: 31st Dáil
- Government: 29th Government of Ireland
- Party: Fine Gael; Labour Party
- Minister for Finance: Michael Noonan (FG)
- Minister for Public Expenditure and Reform: Brendan Howlin (Lab)
- Website: Budget 2014

The 2014 Irish budget was the Irish Government budget for the 2014 fiscal year, which was presented to Dáil Éireann on 15 October 2013.

Michael Noonan outlined the taxation measures with Brendan Howlin detailing the spending cuts. Speaking before the budget, Michael Noonan said that €2.5bn will be taken out of the economy in the Budget and not the projected €3.1bn.

The budget has been met with a mixed reaction from various representative groups and organisations.

== Summary ==
Budget 2014 involved €2.5bn in spending cuts and tax increases.

- No tax relief on top range private health insurance plans.
- Prescription charges for medical card holders increased from €1.50 to €2.50.
- Free GP care for all those aged under five years old to be introduced.
- No change to basic social welfare rates.
- €100 Jobseeker's Allowance reduced rate extended to existing recipients who reach 22, and for new entrants aged up to 24 on or after 1 January 2014. Anyone aged 25 and under who signs on from January 2014 will get €100 a week, down from €144, while 25-year-olds can claim €144, reduced from €188. The full rate will be available to those aged 26 years and over.
- €10m allocated to resolve Priory Hall complex problems.
- Excise duty on a 75cl bottle of wine up 50c.
- A pint of beer/cider up by 10c.
- 10c increase on 20 cigarettes.
- Bereavement Grant of €850 to be discontinued from 1 January 2014.
- Maternity benefit will be standardised to €230 per week from January 2014.
- Child Benefit remains unchanged at €130 per month.
- The telephone allowance for pensioners will be discontinued to save €44 million.
- Air Travel Tax to be abolished in 2014.
