= Aodhán Ó Ríordáin =

Irish politician (born 1976)

Aodhán Ó Ríordáin MEP
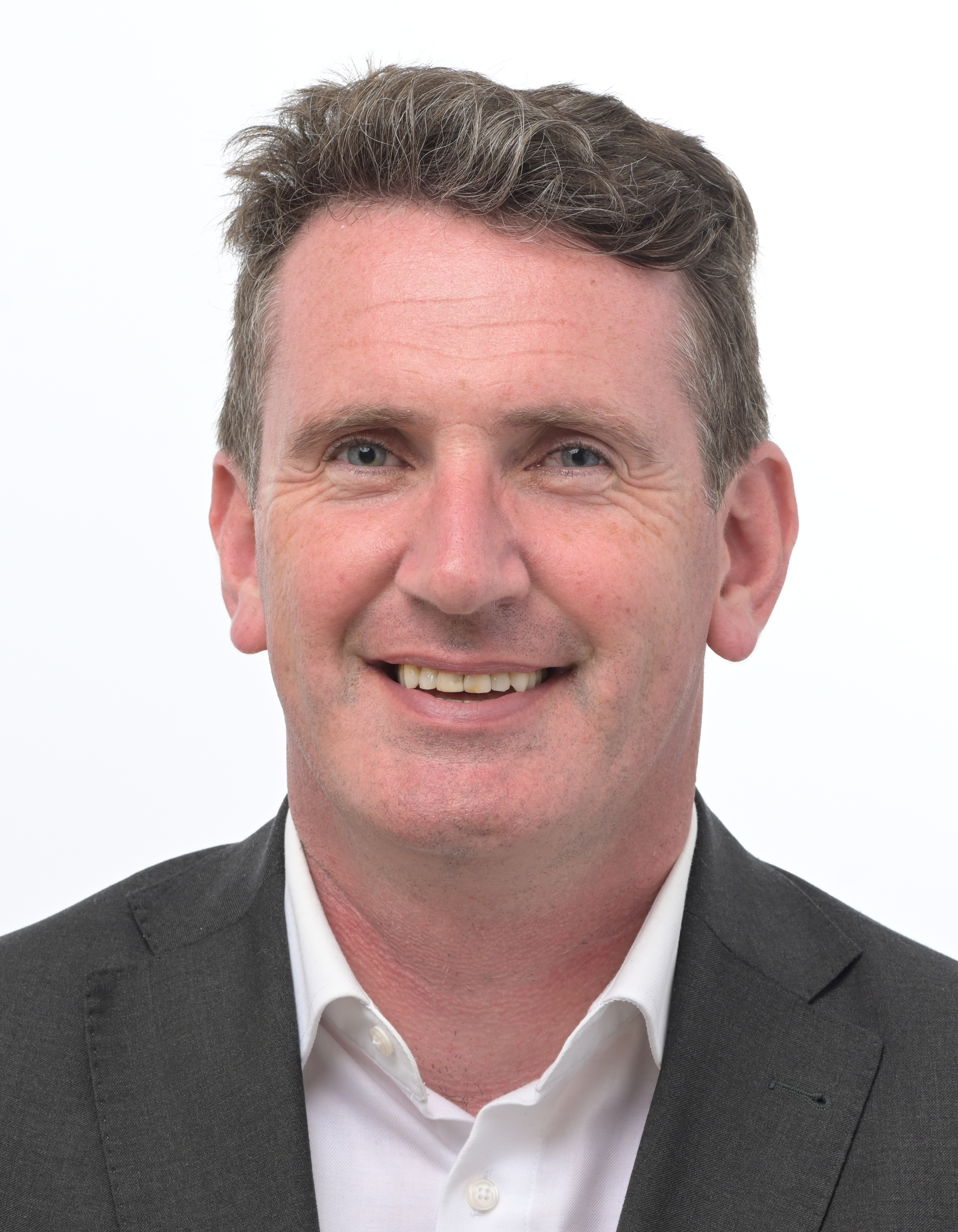
- Ó Ríordáin in 2024

Member of the European Parliament
- Incumbent
- Assumed office 17 July 2024
- Constituency: Dublin

Teachta Dála
- In office February 2020 – 17 July 2024
- Constituency: Dublin Bay North
- In office February 2011 – February 2016
- Constituency: Dublin North-Central

Minister of State
- 2015–2016: Health
- 2014–2016: Justice and Equality
- 2014–2016: Arts, Heritage and Gaeltacht

Senator
- In office 8 June 2016 – 8 February 2020
- Constituency: Industrial and Commercial Panel

Personal details
- Born: 22 July 1976 (age 50) Dublin, Ireland
- Party: Ireland: Labour Party; EU: S&D
- Spouse: Áine Kerr (m. 2010, divorced)
- Domestic partner: Nicola Byrne
- Children: 3
- Education: University College Dublin; Marino Institute of Education

Aodhán Ó Ríordáin (Irish pronunciation: [ˌiːaːn̪ˠ oː ˈɾˠiːɾˠd̪ˠaːnʲ]; born 22 July 1976) is an Irish Labour Party politician who has been a Member of the European Parliament (MEP) from Ireland for the Dublin constituency since July 2024. He previously served as a Teachta Dála (TD) for the Dublin Bay North constituency from the 2020 general election to 2024, and from 2011 to 2016 for the Dublin North-Central constituency. He served as a Minister of State from 2014 to 2016. He was a Senator for the Industrial and Commercial Panel from 2016 to 2020.

== Early life ==
Aodhán Ó Ríordáin was born on 22 July 1976 in Dublin. The son of a secondary school teacher and a civil servant, he grew up in Malahide. In his youth, he had a job as a newspaper delivery boy for the Northside People. He has spoken of his experiences of being bullied in primary school and secondary school, which he attributes to the fact that he was taller than his peers. He attended Gaelscoil Míde and Malahide Community School before graduating to University College Dublin, where he studied Irish and history. After this, he trained to become a teacher at Marino Institute of Education.

Ó Ríordáin is a former teacher, and was principal of St. Laurence O'Toole's Girls' Primary School on Sherriff Street. Prior to teaching, he worked in Irish-language broadcasting, as a film reviewer for the TG4 show "Hollywood Anocht".

== Political career ==
=== Councillor ===
Ó Ríordáin joined the Labour Party in 2002 and was elected to Dublin City Council for the North Inner City local electoral area in 2004, serving from 2004 to 2009 and then for the Clontarf local electoral area from 2009 to 2011. He served as Deputy Lord Mayor of Dublin in 2006, during which time he launched a Right to Read Campaign in an effort to improve the poor literacy rates in disadvantaged areas.

=== TD ===
His move in 2009 to the Clontarf local electoral area positioned Ó Ríordáin to run for election to Dáil Éireann in Dublin North-Central, which he did at the 2011 general election, taking the second seat on the fourth count with 10,192 votes. As a member of the Labour Party backbenches, he served as vice-chairperson of the Oireachtas Committee on Education and Social Protection and as a member of both the Finance, Public Expenditure and Reform Committee and the Good Friday Agreement Implementation Committee.

=== Minister of State ===
On 15 July 2014, Ó Ríordáin was appointed Minister of State with responsibility for New Communities, Culture and Equality at the Department of Justice and Equality and at the Department of Arts, Heritage and the Gaeltacht. As Minister of State he prioritised reforming the direct provision system, ending the legal entitlement of Church-controlled state-funded institutions to discriminate against LGBT people, and played a key role in the Yes campaign in the 2015 marriage equality referendum. He coordinated the Polska Éire 2015 festival, which was a week-long cultural and sporting festival in the run-up to the March 2015 Republic of Ireland v. Poland UEFA European Championship qualifier.

On 22 April 2015, Ó Ríordáin was appointed as Minister of State at the Department of Health, with responsibility for the National Drugs Strategy, in addition to his existing ministerial duties.

=== Seanad Éireann ===
Ó Ríordáin's bid for re-election to the Dáil in Dublin Bay North at the 2016 general election was unsuccessful. He remained as a Minister of State until the formation of a new government of 6 May. He was nominated by the Labour Party for election to Seanad Éireann. In April 2016, he was elected to the 25th Seanad on the Industrial and Commercial Panel.

After Brendan Howlin was elected unopposed as Labour leader, he appointed Ó Ríordáin as Spokesperson on Environment and Sustainable Development, and Gaeltacht Affairs.

On 10 November 2016, following the United States presidential election, Ó Ríordáin made a public statement in the Seanad that went viral on social media, in which he labelled President-elect Donald Trump as a "fascist" and a "monster", quoting Edmund Burke's attributed maxim that "the only way evil can prosper is for good men to do nothing". He condemned Trump's statements threatening to imprison his opponent, former Secretary of State Hillary Clinton, barring Muslims from entering the country, mass deportations, and his assertions that the media and the political system were rigged. Describing current events as an "ugly political crossroads", Ó Ríordáin declared that he was "embarrassed" and "frightened" by the reaction of Taoiseach Enda Kenny and the government, and sarcastically remarked that the government's reaction was to "ring [the U.S. government] up and ask them if it's okay to still bring the shamrock on St. Patrick's Day". He applauded SDLP leader Colum Eastwood's statement that his party would boycott the St. Patrick's Day ceremony at the White House during Trump's presidency.

On 26 October 2017, speaking in the Seanad regarding a mortgage lending scandal, Ó Ríordáin referred to the bankers as a "shower of bastards" who are "getting away with murder, year in year out, in this democracy". He was admonished by Cathaoirleach Denis O'Donovan for using unparliamentary language.

=== Return as TD and Labour Party leadership contest ===
Ó Ríordáin was elected for Dublin Bay North at the 2020 general election, getting 11.3% of the first preference vote. After Brendan Howlin's intention to stand down as party leader following the 2020 general election, Ó Ríordáin was nominated to contest the leadership election by Ged Nash and Ivana Bacik. Ó Ríordáin was also publicly supported by former Labour TD Liz McManus and former lord mayor of Dublin Andrew Montague. Launching his election bid, Ó Ríordáin said that Labour needed to rebuild its relationship with the public and had to get people to "trust us again". On 3 April 2020, it was announced that Ó Ríordáin had received 45% of the vote, with Alan Kelly the winner on 55%.

=== European Parliament ===
In December 2023, Ó Ríordáin announced that he would seek the Labour Party nomination to run in the 2024 European Parliament election in Dublin. In an interview with the Irish Independent, Ó Riordáin said he had initially decided not to contest the election, but had a "visceral" reaction following the violence in the 2023 Dublin riot. He secured the nomination in January 2024, defeating councillor Robert O'Donoghue and senator Annie Hoey at a party convention. Ó Ríordáin received 30,733 (8.2%) first preference votes and was elected on the 19th count. He took office in July 2024.

== Political views ==
=== Abortion ===
Ó Ríordáin is a supporter of abortion rights. He has spoken about having previously held pro-life views but having changed his mind on abortion, saying "Once you meet somebody who has been in England and had an abortion, you find yourself not in any way able to judge them." He campaigned for a "Yes" vote in the 2018 abortion referendum, saying "the 8th amendment has got to go".

On 28 April 2013, the Sunday Independent reported that Ó Ríordáin was secretly recorded by an anti-abortion activist as stating that the Protection of Life During Pregnancy Bill was only "the starting point" on abortion, but that he would not state this publicly. In May 2022, Aontú TD Peadar Toibín sent a legal letter to Ó Ríordáin, regarding a tweet Ó Ríordáin had made about Toibín's anti-abortion views.

=== Drug policy ===
Ó Riordáin is an advocate for legalisation of cannabis. In 2017, he called for cannabis to be legalised, in order to "cut the knees from under drug gangs". In an opinion piece in TheJournal, Ó Riordáin criticised the "war on drugs", mentioning a case where a young man was charged in court with possession of €2 worth of cannabis, describing it as a "waste of Garda time".

Ó Riordáin has advocated for the decriminalisation of small amounts of other drugs. As a minister with responsibility for the National Drugs Strategy, Ó Riordáin brought forward legislation to create several safer injection centres, describing the treatment of drug addicts as criminals as "insanity". After the release of the National Drugs Strategy in 2017, which outlined the option of decriminalisation, he described addicts as people "who should be surrounded with compassion".

=== Education ===
Ó Riordáin put forward a bill in 2018 to tackle school absenteeism, which the government accepted and passed.

During the COVID-19 pandemic, Ó Ríordáin successfully campaigned for Ireland's free school meals campaign to be extended across summer. As Labour's spokesperson on education, Ó Riordáin has called for single-sex schools to be abolished, saying that they are "part of the problem" of gender inequality. He branded education minister Norma Foley and the government a "bad debs committee" in the Dáil over their ruling on mask-wearing in primary schools. He has called for the Leaving Certificate to be abolished and replaced with a "level of assessed grades".

In November 2021, Alphonsus Cullinan, the Catholic Bishop of Waterford and Lismore accused Ó Ríordáin of "almost inciting hatred" for suggesting religious patronage should be removed from schools, referring to a speech Ó Ríordáin made at the 2021 Labour conference. He shouted "Let’s get them out" during the speech. Cullinan wrote a letter of complaint to party leader Alan Kelly. Ó Ríordáin stated that he did not name any particular religious group.

=== Israel–Palestine ===
Ó Ríordáin has described Israeli actions in the Gaza war as "evil in our time" and "genocide". He supports boycotts of Israel, saying that Israel will "never change" unless there is a global boycott and calling on Israeli football teams to be banned from FIFA and UEFA competitions. He called for Ireland to withdraw from the Eurovision Song Contest 2024 due to Israel's participation. He has expressed disapproval of British Labour Party leader Keir Starmer's policies on Gaza, describing them as "incredibly disappointing".

=== LGBTQ rights ===
Ó Ríordáin supported the legalisation of same-sex marriage in the 2015 referendum. In a TV appearance on RTÉ's Saturday Night Show during the campaign, Ó Ríordáin was asked by presenter Brendan O'Connor to remove a rainbow "Yes" pin from his collar.

== Other activities ==
On 28 March 2018, Paddy Jackson and his co-accused were found not guilty of rape and other charges. Following the verdict Ó Riordáin sent a tweet praising the complainant and questioning the jury's decision. In response Jackson's solicitors announced that he intended to sue Ó Riordáin for defamation following a tweet Ó Riordáin made following Jackson's acquittal.

== Personal life ==
He married Áine Kerr in 2010, and they had one child. They have since divorced. Ó Riordáin and his partner Nicola Byrne have two children together.

| Dáil | Election | Deputy (Party) | Deputy (Party) | Deputy (Party) | Deputy (Party) |
|---|---|---|---|---|---|
| 13th | 1948 | Vivion de Valera (FF) | Martin O'Sullivan (Lab) | Patrick McGilligan (FG) | 3 seats 1948–1961 |
| 14th | 1951 | Vivion de Valera (FF) | Colm Gallagher (FF) | Patrick McGilligan (FG) | 3 seats 1948–1961 |
| 15th | 1954 | Vivion de Valera (FF) | Maureen O'Carroll (Lab) | Patrick McGilligan (FG) | 3 seats 1948–1961 |
| 16th | 1957 | Vivion de Valera (FF) | Colm Gallagher (FF) | Patrick McGilligan (FG) | 3 seats 1948–1961 |
| 16th | 1957 by-election | Vivion de Valera (FF) | Frank Sherwin (Ind.) | Patrick McGilligan (FG) | 3 seats 1948–1961 |
| 17th | 1961 | Vivion de Valera (FF) | Frank Sherwin (Ind.) | Patrick McGilligan (FG) | Celia Lynch (FF) |
| 18th | 1965 | Vivion de Valera (FF) | Michael O'Leary (Lab) | Luke Belton (FG) | Celia Lynch (FF) |
| 19th | 1969 | George Colley (FF) | Michael O'Leary (Lab) | Luke Belton (FG) | Celia Lynch (FF) |
| 20th | 1973 | George Colley (FF) | Michael O'Leary (Lab) | Luke Belton (FG) | Celia Lynch (FF) |
| 21st | 1977 | Vincent Brady (FF) | Michael O'Leary (Lab) | Michael Keating (FG) | 3 seats 1977–1981 |
| 22nd | 1981 | Vincent Brady (FF) | Charles Haughey (FF) | Noël Browne (SLP) | George Birmingham (FG) |
| 23rd | 1982 (Feb) | Vincent Brady (FF) | Charles Haughey (FF) | Richard Bruton (FG) | George Birmingham (FG) |
| 24th | 1982 (Nov) | Vincent Brady (FF) | Charles Haughey (FF) | Richard Bruton (FG) | George Birmingham (FG) |
| 25th | 1987 | Vincent Brady (FF) | Charles Haughey (FF) | Richard Bruton (FG) | George Birmingham (FG) |
| 26th | 1989 | Vincent Brady (FF) | Charles Haughey (FF) | Richard Bruton (FG) | Ivor Callely (FF) |
| 27th | 1992 | Seán Haughey (FF) | Derek McDowell (Lab) | Richard Bruton (FG) | Ivor Callely (FF) |
| 28th | 1997 | Seán Haughey (FF) | Derek McDowell (Lab) | Richard Bruton (FG) | Ivor Callely (FF) |
| 29th | 2002 | Seán Haughey (FF) | Finian McGrath (Ind.) | Richard Bruton (FG) | Ivor Callely (FF) |
| 30th | 2007 | Seán Haughey (FF) | Finian McGrath (Ind.) | Richard Bruton (FG) | 3 seats from 2007 |
| 31st | 2011 | Aodhán Ó Ríordáin (Lab) | Finian McGrath (Ind.) | Richard Bruton (FG) | 3 seats from 2007 |
| 32nd | 2016 | Constituency abolished. See Dublin Bay North | | | |

| Dáil | Election | Deputy (Party) | Deputy (Party) | Deputy (Party) | Deputy (Party) | Deputy (Party) |
|---|---|---|---|---|---|---|
| 32nd | 2016 | Denise Mitchell (SF) | Tommy Broughan (I4C) | Finian McGrath (Ind.) | Seán Haughey (FF) | Richard Bruton (FG) |
| 33rd | 2020 | Denise Mitchell (SF) | Cian O'Callaghan (SD) | Aodhán Ó Ríordáin (Lab) | Seán Haughey (FF) | Richard Bruton (FG) |
| 34th | 2024 | Denise Mitchell (SF) | Cian O'Callaghan (SD) | Barry Heneghan (Ind.) | Tom Brabazon (FF) | Naoise Ó Muirí (FG) |
