= Marie Sherlock =

Irish politician

Marie Sherlock TD
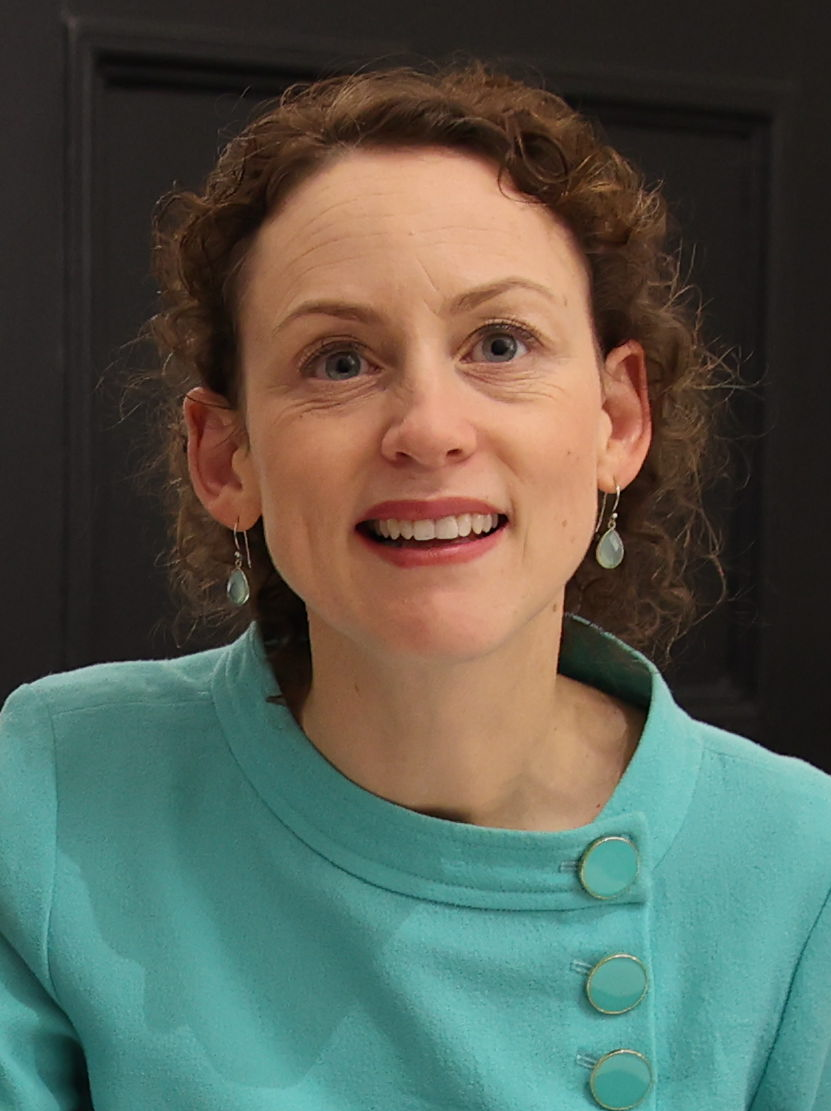
- Sherlock in 2024

Teachta Dála
- Incumbent
- Assumed office November 2024
- Constituency: Dublin Central

Senator
- In office 29 June 2020 – 30 November 2024
- Constituency: Labour Panel

Personal details
- Born: Cork, Ireland
- Party: Labour Party
- Spouse: Ciarán
- Children: 3
- Relatives: Joe Sherlock (uncle); Seán Sherlock (cousin)
- Education: Trinity College Dublin; University of Cambridge; University College Dublin
- Website: mariesherlock.ie

Marie Sherlock is an Irish Labour Party politician who has been a Teachta Dála (TD) for the Dublin Central constituency since the 2024 general election. She previously served as a Senator on the Labour Panel from 2020 to 2024.

== Early life and education ==
Sherlock is from Carrignavar, County Cork. She attended Colaiste An Chroi Naofa before graduating with a Bachelor of Arts in Economics and Political Science from Trinity College Dublin, a Master of Arts in Economics from University College Dublin, and a Master of Philosophy in Land Economy from the University of Cambridge.

== Political career ==
She represented the Cabra-Glasnevin local electoral area on Dublin City Council from 2019 to 2020, and was the party's Head of Manifesto Development.

At the 2020 Seanad election, she was elected to Seanad Éireann on the Labour Panel.

She was also a researcher for the Party of European Socialists in the European Parliament and was a trade union official and economic advisor to SIPTU for over 10 years.

On July 2024, Sherlock was selected by the Labour Party to contest the Dublin Central constituency at the 2024 general election. Sherlock secured the final seat available at the expense of Gerry Hutch.

== Personal life ==
She lives in Phibsborough with her husband Ciarán and their three children. Her uncle Joe Sherlock, and his son (Marie's cousin) Seán Sherlock, were also Labour TDs.

Dáil	Election	Deputy (Party)	Deputy (Party)	Deputy (Party)	Deputy (Party)
19th	1969	Frank Cluskey (Lab)	Vivion de Valera (FF)	Thomas J. Fitzpatrick (FF)	Maurice E. Dockrell (FG)
20th	1973	Frank Cluskey (Lab)	Vivion de Valera (FF)	Thomas J. Fitzpatrick (FF)	Maurice E. Dockrell (FG)
21st	1977	Constituency abolished			

Dáil	Election	Deputy (Party)	Deputy (Party)	Deputy (Party)	Deputy (Party)	Deputy (Party)
22nd	1981	Bertie Ahern (FF)	Michael Keating (FG)	Alice Glenn (FG)	Michael O'Leary (Lab)	George Colley (FF)
23rd	1982 (Feb)	Bertie Ahern (FF)	Michael Keating (FG)	Tony Gregory (Ind.)	Michael O'Leary (Lab)	George Colley (FF)
24th	1982 (Nov)	Bertie Ahern (FF)	Michael Keating (FG)	Tony Gregory (Ind.)	Alice Glenn (FG)	George Colley (FF)
24th	1983 by-election	Bertie Ahern (FF)	Michael Keating (FG)	Tony Gregory (Ind.)	Alice Glenn (FG)	Tom Leonard (FF)
25th	1987	Bertie Ahern (FF)	Michael Keating (PDs)	Tony Gregory (Ind.)	Dermot Fitzpatrick (FF)	John Stafford (FF)
26th	1989	Bertie Ahern (FF)	Pat Lee (FG)	Tony Gregory (Ind.)	Dermot Fitzpatrick (FF)	John Stafford (FF)
27th	1992	Bertie Ahern (FF)	Jim Mitchell (FG)	Tony Gregory (Ind.)	Joe Costello (Lab)	4 seats 1992–2016
28th	1997	Bertie Ahern (FF)	Jim Mitchell (FG)	Tony Gregory (Ind.)	Marian McGennis (FF)	4 seats 1992–2016
29th	2002	Bertie Ahern (FF)	Dermot Fitzpatrick (FF)	Tony Gregory (Ind.)	Joe Costello (Lab)	4 seats 1992–2016
30th	2007	Bertie Ahern (FF)	Cyprian Brady (FF)	Tony Gregory (Ind.)	Joe Costello (Lab)	4 seats 1992–2016
30th	2009 by-election	Bertie Ahern (FF)	Cyprian Brady (FF)	Maureen O'Sullivan (Ind.)	Joe Costello (Lab)	4 seats 1992–2016
31st	2011	Mary Lou McDonald (SF)	Paschal Donohoe (FG)	Maureen O'Sullivan (Ind.)	Joe Costello (Lab)	4 seats 1992–2016
32nd	2016	Mary Lou McDonald (SF)	Paschal Donohoe (FG)	Maureen O'Sullivan (Ind.)	3 seats 2016–2020	
33rd	2020	Mary Lou McDonald (SF)	Paschal Donohoe (FG)	Gary Gannon (SD)	Neasa Hourigan (GP)	4 seats from 2020
34th	2024	Mary Lou McDonald (SF)	Paschal Donohoe (FG)	Gary Gannon (SD)	Marie Sherlock (Lab)	4 seats from 2020
34th	2026 by-election	Mary Lou McDonald (SF)	Daniel Ennis (SD)	Gary Gannon (SD)	Marie Sherlock (Lab)	4 seats from 2020
