= 2015 Irish budget =

- Presented: 14 October 2014
- Country: Ireland
- Parliament: 31st Dáil
- Government: 29th Government of Ireland
- Party: Fine Gael; Labour Party
- Minister for Finance: Michael Noonan (FG)
- Minister for Public Expenditure and Reform: Brendan Howlin (Lab)
- Website: Budget 2015

The 2015 Irish budget was the Irish Government budget for the 2015 fiscal year, which was presented to Dáil Éireann on 14 October 2014.

The Minister for Finance Michael Noonan outlined the taxation measures with Brendan Howlin detailing the spending. The government reversed some of the austerity measures that were introduced over the past six years with extra spending and tax cuts worth just over €1bn.

== Summary ==
- Child Benefit increase to rise €5 per child
- New 8% USC rate for those earning over €70,000
- Entry point for USC raised to above €12,000
- Water Charges Relief worth up to €100
- Income tax relief on water charges up to max of €500
- 41% Income Tax rate reduced to 40%
- Price of 20 cigarettes to rise by 40c from 15 October 2014
- 9% VAT rate to stay
- 'Double Irish' tax arrangement to be abolished by 2020
