= Leader of the Labour Party (Ireland) =

Leader of the Labour Party in Ireland

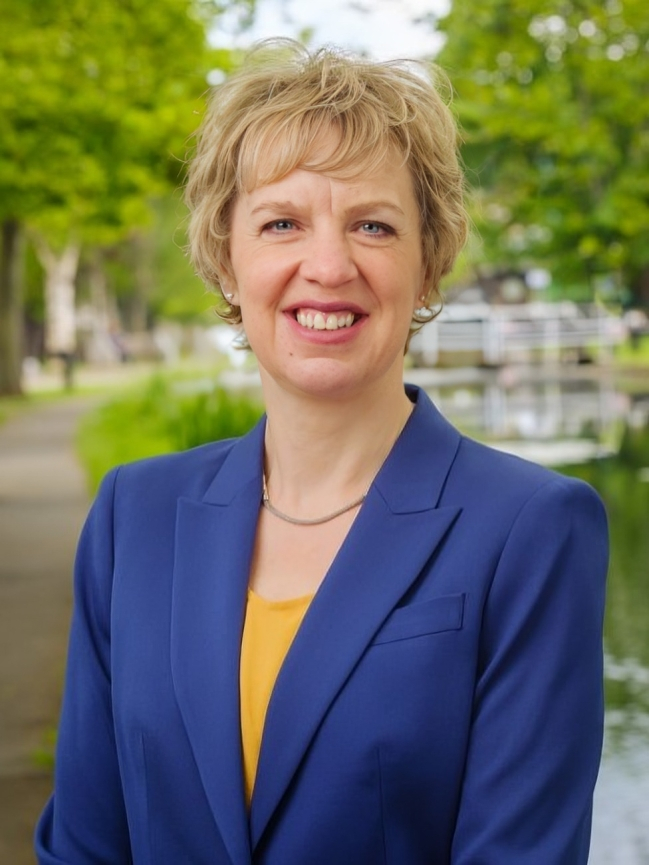
- Incumbent; Ivana Bacik since 24 March 2022
- Inaugural holder: James Connolly (de facto); Thomas Johnson (de jure)
- Formation: 1912 (de facto); 1917 (de jure)
- Website: Ivana Bacik, TD

The leader of the Labour Party is the most senior politician within the Labour Party in Ireland. Since 24 March 2022, the office has been held by Ivana Bacik, following the resignation of Alan Kelly as leader of the party.

In a review of procedures at the party's 2017 conference, the position of Deputy leader was abolished after a year of lying vacant, and the nomination and seconding of new leadership candidates was extended to Senators and MEPs as well as TDs.

== Leaders ==
Name	Portrait	Constituency	Term of Office		Office(s)
Thomas Johnson		Dublin County	1914	1927	Leader of the Opposition
Thomas J. O'Connell		Mayo South	1927	1932	
William Norton		Kildare	1932	2 March 1960	Tánaiste; Minister for Social Welfare; Minister for Industry and Commerce
Brendan Corish		Wexford	2 March 1960	26 June 1977	Tánaiste; Minister for Health; Minister for Social Welfare
Frank Cluskey		Dublin South-Central	1 July 1977	12 June 1981	
Michael O'Leary		Dublin North-Central	17 June 1981	1 November 1982	Tánaiste; Minister for Energy
Dick Spring		Kerry North	1 November 1982	13 November 1997	Tánaiste; Minister for the Environment; Minister for Energy; Minister for Foreign Affairs
Ruairi Quinn		Dublin South-East	13 November 1997	25 October 2002	
Pat Rabbitte		Dublin South-West	25 October 2002	6 September 2007	
Eamon Gilmore		Dún Laoghaire	6 September 2007	4 July 2014	Tánaiste; Minister for Foreign Affairs and Trade
Joan Burton		Dublin West	4 July 2014	20 May 2016	Tánaiste; Minister for Social Protection
Brendan Howlin		Wexford	20 May 2016	3 April 2020	
Alan Kelly		Tipperary	3 April 2020	24 March 2022	
Ivana Bacik		Dublin Bay South	24 March 2022	Incumbent	

== Deputy leaders ==
Name (Birth–Death)	Portrait	Constituency	Term of Office		Office(s) held
James Tully		Meath	1972	1 July 1977	Minister for Local Government
Michael O'Leary		Dublin North-Central	1 July 1977	17 June 1981	
James Tully		Meath	17 June 1981	22 February 1982	Minister for Defence
Barry Desmond		Dún Laoghaire	22 February 1982	July 1989	Minister for Social Welfare; Minister for Health
Ruairi Quinn		Dublin South-East	July 1989	13 November 1997	Minister for Enterprise and Employment; Minister for Finance
Brendan Howlin		Wexford	13 November 1997	25 October 2002	
Liz McManus		Wicklow	25 October 2002	4 October 2007	
Joan Burton		Dublin West	4 October 2007	4 July 2014	Minister for Social Protection
Alan Kelly		Tipperary North	4 July 2014	20 May 2016	Minister of State for Public and Commuter Transport; Minister for the Environment, Community and Local Government
Position vacant			20 May 2016		
Position abolished			April 2017		

== See also ==
- History of the Labour Party
- Leader of Fine Gael
- Leader of Fianna Fáil
- Leader of Sinn Féin
