= Joe Sherlock =

Irish politician (1930–2007)

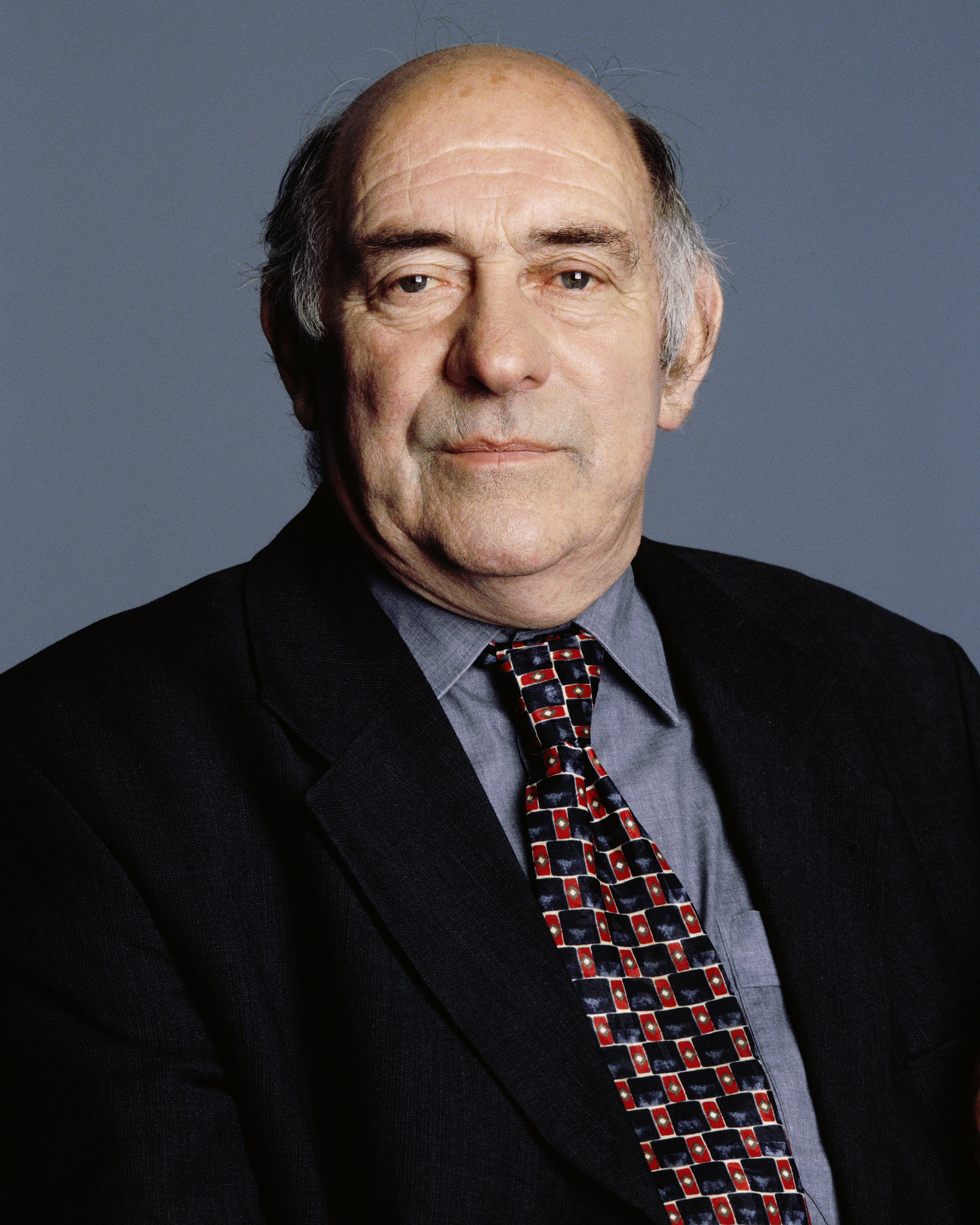
- Sherlock, c. 2002

Teachta Dála
- In office May 2002 – May 2007
- In office February 1987 – November 1992
- In office June 1981 – November 1982
- Constituency: Cork East

Senator
- In office 17 February 1993 – 17 September 1997
- Constituency: Labour Panel

Personal details
- Born: 26 September 1930 Kildorrery, County Cork, Ireland
- Died: 10 September 2007 (aged 76) Cork, Ireland
- Party: Labour Party
- Other political affiliations: Sinn Féin; Workers' Party; Democratic Left
- Spouse: Ellen Spillane
- Children: 3, including Seán

Joe Sherlock (26 September 1930 – 10 September 2007) was an Irish Labour Party politician who served as a Teachta Dála (TD) from 2002 to 2007, 1987 to 1992 and 1981 to 1982. He was a Senator for the Labour Panel from 1993 to 1997.

== Biography ==
Sherlock was born in Kildorrery, County Cork, in 1930. He was educated at the local national school. He took part in the IRA's Border Campaign as a young man, which resulted in him being imprisoned in Mountjoy Prison for six months. However, following the failure of the campaign, he endorsed the IRA's and Sinn Féin's move towards social activism and participating in politics. He worked at the local sugar factory for 18 years, and first held political office in 1967, when he was elected to Mallow Urban District Council as a Sinn Féin representative. During the split in Sinn Féin in 1970, Sherlock remained with the "Official" wing of the movement. In 1974, he was elected to Cork County Council. He served as Chairperson of Mallow UDC. He held both seats until the ending of the dual mandate in 2003. He was first elected to Dáil Éireann at the 1981 general election as a Sinn Féin - The Workers' Party TD.

Sherlock was re-elected at the February 1982 general election, but lost his seat at the November 1982 general election. Despite the loss of his seat, he continued to be active in local politics. He was elected to the Dáil again at the 1987 and 1989 general elections, but lost his seat at the 1992 general election. Joining the new Democratic Left party, he was elected to Seanad Éireann in 1993 (as part of an election pact with the Progressive Democrats), serving in the upper house until 1997. He failed to be elected to the Dáil again at the 1997 general election, but eventually regained his seat after ten years at the 2002 general election.

In July 2005, Sherlock announced that he would not be standing again in the next general election. His son Seán Sherlock, then a member of both Cork County Council and Mallow Town Council, was elected at the 2007 general election to succeed him.

He died on 10 September 2007, after a short illness.

Dáil	Election	Deputy (Party)	Deputy (Party)	Deputy (Party)	Deputy (Party)	Deputy (Party)
4th	1923	John Daly (Ind.)	Michael Hennessy (CnaG)	David Kent (Rep)	John Dinneen (FP)	Thomas O'Mahony (CnaG)
4th	1924 by-election	John Daly (Ind.)	Michael Hennessy (CnaG)	David Kent (Rep)	John Dinneen (FP)	Michael K. Noonan (CnaG)
5th	1927 (Jun)	John Daly (Ind.)	Michael Hennessy (CnaG)	David Kent (SF)	David O'Gorman (FP)	Martin Corry (FF)
6th	1927 (Sep)	John Daly (CnaG)	Michael Hennessy (CnaG)	William Kent (FF)	Edmond Carey (CnaG)	Martin Corry (FF)
7th	1932	John Daly (CnaG)	William Broderick (CnaG)	Brook Brasier (Ind.)	Patrick Murphy (FF)	Martin Corry (FF)
8th	1933	Patrick Daly (CnaG)	William Broderick (CnaG)	William Kent (NCP)	Patrick Murphy (FF)	Martin Corry (FF)
9th	1937	Constituency abolished				

Dáil	Election	Deputy (Party)	Deputy (Party)	Deputy (Party)
13th	1948	Martin Corry (FF)	Patrick O'Gorman (FG)	Seán Keane (Lab)
14th	1951	Martin Corry (FF)	Patrick O'Gorman (FG)	Seán Keane (Lab)
14th	1953 by-election	Martin Corry (FF)	Patrick O'Gorman (FG)	Richard Barry (FG)
15th	1954	Martin Corry (FF)	John Moher (FF)	Richard Barry (FG)
16th	1957	Martin Corry (FF)	John Moher (FF)	Richard Barry (FG)
17th	1961	Constituency abolished		

Dáil	Election	Deputy (Party)	Deputy (Party)	Deputy (Party)	Deputy (Party)
22nd	1981	Carey Joyce (FF)	Myra Barry (FG)	Patrick Hegarty (FG)	Joe Sherlock (SF–WP)
23rd	1982 (Feb)	Michael Ahern (FF)	Myra Barry (FG)	Patrick Hegarty (FG)	Joe Sherlock (SF–WP)
24th	1982 (Nov)	Michael Ahern (FF)	Myra Barry (FG)	Patrick Hegarty (FG)	Ned O'Keeffe (FF)
25th	1987	Michael Ahern (FF)	Joe Sherlock (WP)	Patrick Hegarty (FG)	Ned O'Keeffe (FF)
26th	1989	Michael Ahern (FF)	Joe Sherlock (WP)	Paul Bradford (FG)	Ned O'Keeffe (FF)
27th	1992	Michael Ahern (FF)	John Mulvihill (Lab)	Paul Bradford (FG)	Ned O'Keeffe (FF)
28th	1997	Michael Ahern (FF)	David Stanton (FG)	Paul Bradford (FG)	Ned O'Keeffe (FF)
29th	2002	Michael Ahern (FF)	David Stanton (FG)	Joe Sherlock (Lab)	Ned O'Keeffe (FF)
30th	2007	Michael Ahern (FF)	David Stanton (FG)	Seán Sherlock (Lab)	Ned O'Keeffe (FF)
31st	2011	Sandra McLellan (SF)	David Stanton (FG)	Seán Sherlock (Lab)	Tom Barry (FG)
32nd	2016	Pat Buckley (SF)	David Stanton (FG)	Seán Sherlock (Lab)	Kevin O'Keeffe (FF)
33rd	2020	Pat Buckley (SF)	David Stanton (FG)	Seán Sherlock (Lab)	James O'Connor (FF)
34th	2024	Pat Buckley (SF)	Noel McCarthy (FG)	Liam Quaide (SD)	James O'Connor (FF)
