= 2016 Labour Party leadership election (Ireland) =

Irish Labour Party leadership election

← 2014	20 May 2016	2020 →
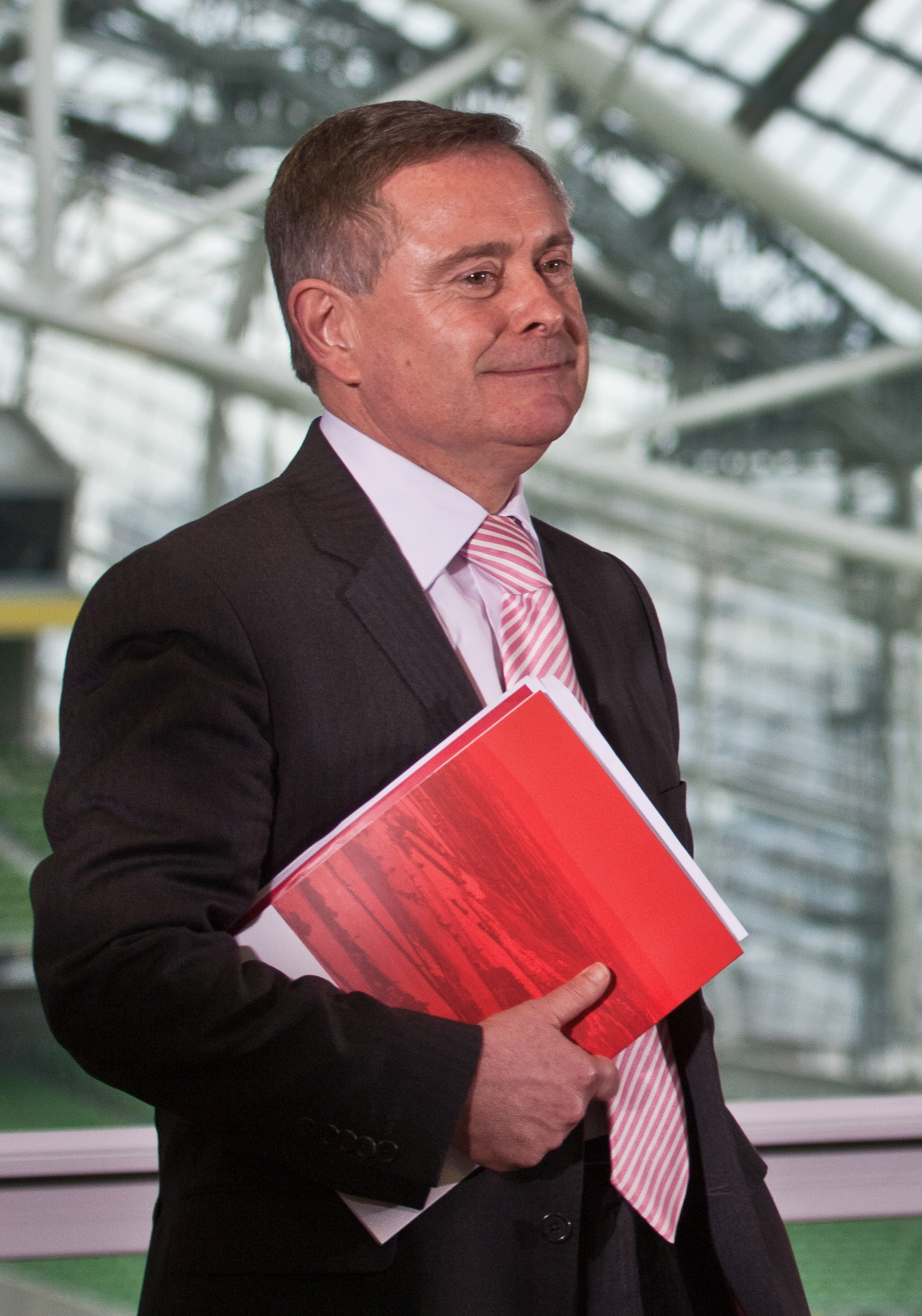
Candidate	Brendan Howlin
Percentage	Unopposed
Leader before election
Joan Burton
Elected Leader
Brendan Howlin

Alan Kelly's hand during his television interview announcing his intention to lead the Labour Party

The 2016 Labour Party leadership election was a leadership election within Ireland's Labour Party that was triggered when Joan Burton announced her intention to relinquish the role of leader. Burton decided to step down as Labour leader on 10 May 2016, and in the aftermath of the party's poor showing at the 2016 general election.

In contention for the position were Brendan Howlin, Seán Sherlock and Alan Kelly. Kelly announced his intention to seek leadership of the Labour Party on 13 May. That evening, he appeared as a guest on The Late Late Show, during which he high fived the host Ryan Tubridy, hinted that he would not necessarily have a deputy leader and appeared to have a mysterious message scrawled on his left hand.

However, Kelly failed to garner the necessary support to enter the contest, and Howlin was elected unopposed to lead Labour on 20 May 2016.
