= Alan Kelly (politician) =

Irish politician (born 1975)

Alan Kelly TD
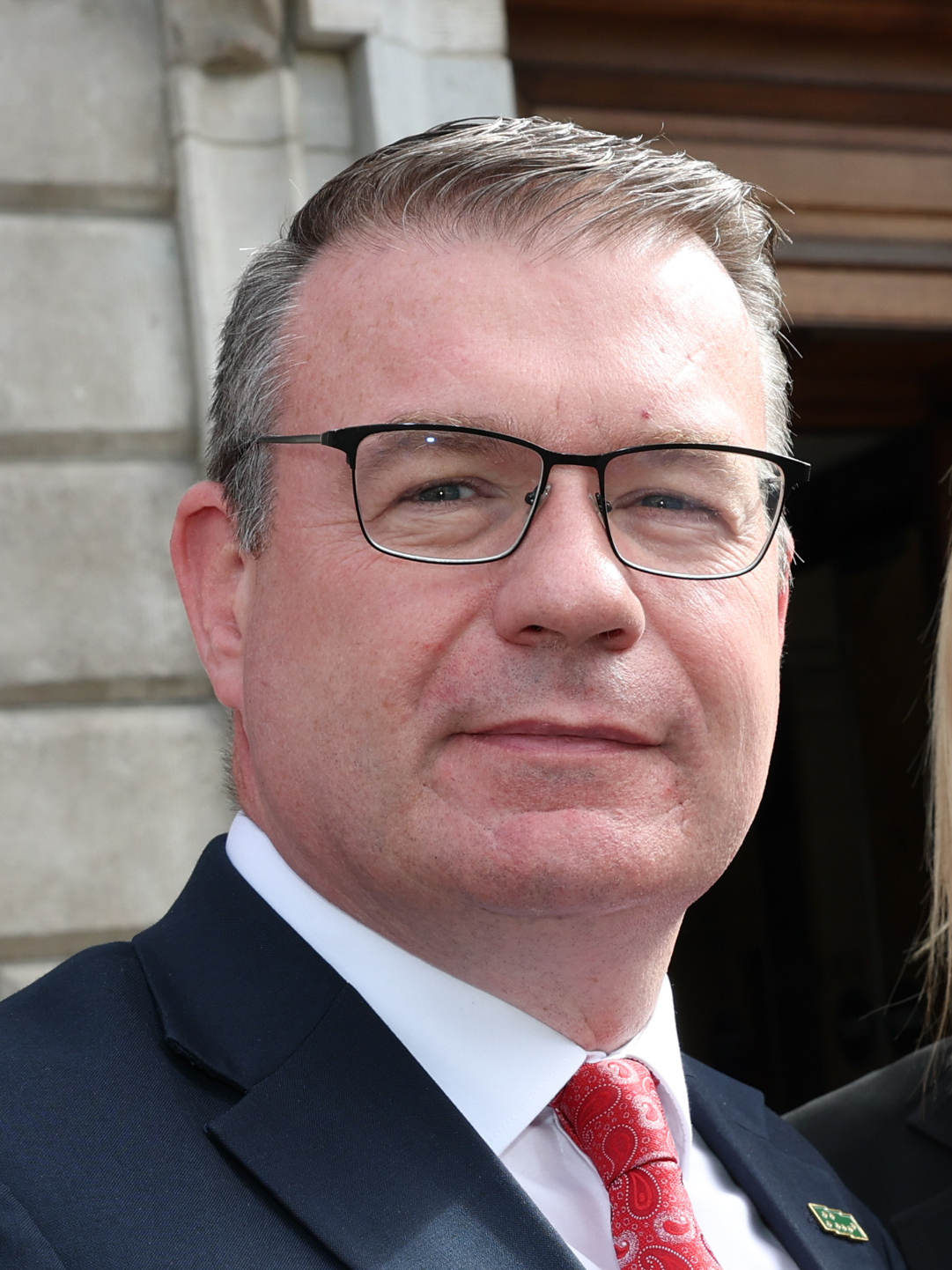
- Kelly in 2025

Teachta Dála
- Incumbent
- Assumed office November 2024
- In office February 2011 – February 2016
- Constituency: Tipperary North
- In office February 2016 – November 2024
- Constituency: Tipperary

Leader of the Labour Party
- In office 3 April 2020 – 24 March 2022
- Preceded by: Brendan Howlin
- Succeeded by: Ivana Bacik

Deputy leader of the Labour Party
- In office 4 July 2014 – 20 May 2016
- Leader: Joan Burton
- Preceded by: Joan Burton
- Succeeded by: Office abolished

Minister for the Environment, Community and Local Government
- In office 11 July 2014 – 6 May 2016
- Taoiseach: Enda Kenny
- Preceded by: Phil Hogan
- Succeeded by: Simon Coveney

Minister of State
- 2011–2014: Transport, Tourism and Sport

Member of the European Parliament
- In office 1 July 2009 – 9 March 2011
- Constituency: South

Senator
- In office 13 September 2007 – 1 July 2009
- Constituency: Agricultural Panel

Personal details
- Born: Alan Thomas Kelly; 13 July 1975 (age 51) Portroe, County Tipperary, Ireland
- Party: Labour Party
- Spouse: Regina O'Connor (m. 2007)
- Children: 2
- Relatives: Declan Kelly (brother)
- Education: University College Cork; University College Dublin
- Website: alankelly.ie

Alan Thomas Kelly (born 13 July 1975) is an Irish politician and author who has been a Teachta Dála (TD) for the Tipperary North constituency since the 2024 general election, and previously from 2011 to 2016. He was a TD for the Tipperary constituency from 2016 to 2024. He previously served as the leader of the Labour Party from 2020 to 2022.

Following the 2011 election, Kelly served as a minister in the Government of the 31st Dail, as part of the Fine Gael-Labour Party coalition. He served as Minister for the Environment, Community and Local Government and Deputy leader of the Labour Party from 2014 to 2016 and a Minister of State from 2011 to 2014. He was a Member of the European Parliament for the South constituency from 2009 to 2011 and a Senator for the Agricultural Panel from 2007 to 2009.

== Early life ==
Kelly is from Portroe just outside Nenagh, County Tipperary. He is the son of Tom and Nan Kelly. His parents' house burned down in 1974, the year before he was born. Kelly was raised on a small dairy farm. His father left farming following the introduction of milk quotas by the European Council in the 1980s and found employment working on the roads for the local county council. Educated at Nenagh CBS, he subsequently attended University College Cork (UCC), where he completed a BA in English and History in 1995. Two years later he completed a M.Phil in Political History. Kelly continued his education at Boston College, where he achieved a Certificate in Leadership in 1999. He returned to Ireland shortly after this and completed a MBS in eCommerce in 2002. Kelly subsequently worked as an eBusiness Manager with Bord Fáilte and Fáilte Ireland.

== Political career ==
=== Youth politics ===
In Kelly's final year of secondary school, he canvassed for the Labour Party during the 1992 general election. He remained active in left-wing politics in university, establishing the Jim Kemmy Branch of the Labour Party in UCC. He then became involved in a number of by-elections, local election campaigns in Cork and in the wider Munster area. He has stated that he was "politically socialised in Cork".

Kelly became Chair of Labour Youth in 2000, having previously served as co-chair. In 2001 he was a member of the General Council. In 2001 and 2002 he was director of the Tom Johnson Summer School and was also a member of the General Election Planning Committee in the period 2001–2002.

=== Seanad Éireann (2007–2009) ===
In 2007, Kelly was elected to Seanad Éireann on the Agricultural Panel. Later in 2007, Eamon Gilmore, the newly elected leader of the Labour Party, appointed Kelly as Spokesperson on Tourism and was Seanad Spokesperson on Finance and Local Government.

=== European Parliament (2009–2011) ===
At the 2009 European Parliament election, Kelly was for the South constituency, taking the last seat in a tight battle between him, Sinn Féin's Toireasa Ferris and the Independent Kathy Sinnott. Kelly was a member of the European Parliament's Committee on Internal Market and Consumer Protection. He also served on the Delegation for Relations with the United States.

=== Dáil Éireann (2011–present) ===
==== Minister of State (2011–2014) ====
Though he had promised he would see out his five-year term in the European Parliament, Kelly contested the 2011 general election. He ran in the Tipperary North constituency and was successful, receiving 9,559 first preference votes (19.8%) and securing the third and final seat at the expense of Fianna Fáil's sitting TD, Máire Hoctor. Phil Prendergast replaced him as MEP for the South constituency.

After the formation of a Fine Gael–Labour coalition government, Kelly was appointed as Minister of State at the Department of Transport, Tourism and Sport with responsibility for Public and Commuter Transport. Kelly began receiving death threats during this period.

==== Labour Party deputy leadership and cabinet minister (2014–2016) ====
He was elected as deputy leader of the Labour Party on 4 July 2014. On 11 July 2014, he was appointed Minister of the Environment, Community and Local Government, succeeding Phil Hogan, who had been nominated as EU Commissioner. When Kelly was given his ministerial role, he initially believed that property tax would be the big issue, but within a week realised that it would be the implementation of water charges and the Irish Water as required by the EU Water Framework Directive. Kelly claimed that his predecessor, Phil Hogan, had "designed the ditches" and that he now had to "drive the tractor through". Kelly also complained of the position that he had been left with upon becoming accustomed to the role. The cabinet had previously been told by the ERSI that the cost-benefit analysis on water metering was "robust" and based on "realistic and achievable assumptions regarding the benefits". However, by the time Kelly inherited the ministry, "it had fallen apart," according to Michael Brennan in his 2019 book In Deep Water: How People, Politics and Protests sank Irish Water. Writing on Kelly in How Ireland Voted 2016: The Election Nobody Won, the authors claimed that Phil Hogan left "the controversy surrounding water charges remained for his successor, Labour's Alan Kelly, to deal with".

His involvement in Irish Water was controversial during his tenure as minister. He received death threats on a regular basis during his tenure as minister. As minister, Kelly announced a two-year rent freeze to combat the housing crisis. He said that "blockages" had made solving the housing crisis difficult. A law brought in by Kelly was criticised by the Irish Planning Institute (IPI), who said that it would increase ministerial planning powers over local authorities and could significantly change how planning operates in Ireland. Councillors opposed to the law said that it was a "power grab", and claimed it could significantly limit the planning powers of local government. In November 2014, the Independent reported that Kelly had received death threats. Also in November 2014 he claimed that he had received four death threats from "anonymous warriors" in a single week. Kelly's constituency office received a bomb threat in November 2014. In December 2014 it was reported that a staff member who answered a call was told "a bullet will be put in his head before the end of the day. And we'll come down and put a bullet in your head too, you rich f**k. We won't be paying water charges." A threatening letter sent to his office in 2015 containing a 'suspicious powder' was declared a hoax by the Gardai and the Defence Forces. EU Commissioner Phil Hogan moved to distance himself from the controversies with Irish Water by stressing that Kelly was now in charge of water. Barry Cowen claimed in relation to a policy change that "the issue with the policy is that everytime Alan Kelly picks up a phone to a journalist, his policy for Irish Water changes and it’s become absolutely farcical."

In 2015, the Sunday Business Post claimed that Kelly "ignored expert advice by giving €1.5 million in grants to towns in his new constituency", stating that was responsible for the active travel towns scheme, which provides funding for walking and cycling routes to get people to switch from their cars. He gave €1 million to Clonmel and more than €500,000 to Thurles under the scheme, even though projects from other towns “got significantly higher marks” in assessments.

In December 2015 Kelly became emotional as he strongly denied claims that he had leaked information about the Labour Party to the media. A number of Labour TDs identified him as the source of a leak of an internal analysis which suggested that Labour would lose up to 20 seats at the upcoming general election.

Kelly attracted further controversy following a January 2016 interview in the Sunday Independent headlined "Alan Kelly: 'Power is a drug ... it suits me'". He later clarified the context in a June 2020 interview with The Mirror, saying,

"I did say those words, but everybody forgets about the dot, dot, dot in the middle. I’ve nothing against the journalist now, but if you read it, power is a drug, it suits me, there's a dot, dot, dot in the middle. The conversation was about how some people are always in opposition and will never want to go into government. Some people, you know, being in government suits them. They're able to handle it or deal with it, or whatever. That was the conversation and I suppose power, being in power, being in government are interchangeable words, so that was the context of it. But when you're explaining you're losing".

Kelly was appointed Labour's director of elections and chair of the party's national campaign committee for the 2016 general election. Kelly attracted controversy for his association with John Delaney of the FAI and denied claims that Delaney was stopping people and asking them to vote for him during the 2016 general election campaign. Delaney had asked people to support Kelly on MidWest Radio. Kelly insisted that having Delaney support him was not a form of cronyism. Following the election, Kelly remained Minister for the Environment, Community and Local Government until May 2016 during prolonged talks on government formation.

==== Opposition and leadership challenges (2016–2020) ====
In May 2016, Kelly announced his intention to seek the leadership of the Labour Party. However, he failed to attract a nomination from his parliamentary colleagues, resulting in the unopposed appointment of Brendan Howlin as the new leader. Kelly was not present at the conference at which Howlin was announced as leader. One TD who was present described Kelly's no-show as "childish" and "disrespectful". Kelly was adamant that Howlin "blocked" his leadership ambitions by warning colleagues that he would not stand if there was a contest. Later, Kelly tweeted an image of seven pints of Guinness lined up, ranging from full to half empty, with the cryptic message: "The seven stages of leadership". He was reportedly "considering his future in politics after being left humiliated by his parliamentary party", according to the Irish Independent. Sarah McInerney of The Times wrote an opinion piece supporting Kelly titled "The man we love to hate should be leading Labour".

Grassroots efforts to put pressure on members of the parliamentary party were unsuccessful. The parliamentary party also decided not to nominate any candidates for the position of deputy leader, leaving Kelly's previous position vacant. When asked by Hot Press if he felt "shafted", he replied saying; "Yes. I was pretty annoyed about what happened. It was a difficult period but I've moved on. There are no issues. I don't bear grudges. But you don't forget. You put it inward and you use it for motivation – and you move on." In the same interview, he said that it was "wrong" that the grassroots membership couldn't have a say. In Spring 2017, Kelly was approached to join Fine Gael by the Tipperary organisation, which he declined. A source believed to be close to Kelly confirmed this to be true but said that "Alan has time and time again said that Labour values are in his DNA and that's certainly true. He's always talking about workers and the value of work. He is certainly not one of those who just pander to the welfare or liberal agendas that Labour has become so associated with. His ambition is to drag the Labour Party back towards what he believes in rather than ever leave it".

In a Hot Press interview in 2017, he described himself as a practicing Catholic and said that he is very liberal on "most issues". He stated that he was opposed to the legalisation of prostitution, but was in favour of the legalisation of marijuana.

In September 2017, Kelly called for the HPV vaccine to be given to all schoolboys in Ireland. The vaccine's roll-out among girls had recently been subject to controversy over its alleged side effects.

In November 2017, Kelly was criticised by his Labour colleagues after he warned leader Brendan Howlin that he had less than six months to turn the party's fortunes around. However, the chair of the Association of Labour Councillors, Dermot Lacey, said: "If there had been an election [in 2016], I would have voted for Alan. If there is an election, I will vote for him. At the moment there isn't a contest."

In August 2018, Kelly challenged Howlin for the party leadership. His challenge failed due to lack of support from his parliamentary colleagues. The Irish Independent described his efforts to become leader as "persistent".

At the 2020 general election, Kelly was re-elected to represent the Tipperary constituency, obtaining 13,222 first preference votes (9.6%) and securing the fourth of five seats. In 2020, Kelly was Labour's spokesperson on health.

==== Labour Party leader (2020–2022) ====
Brendan Howlin stood down as party leader following the 2020 general election. Kelly was nominated in the leadership election by two of the party's six TDs, Seán Sherlock and Duncan Smith. He was also publicly supported by former Labour TDs Jan O'Sullivan and Willie Penrose. Launching his election bid, Kelly said that a complete rebuild of the Labour Party was needed. On 3 April 2020, he was announced as the new leader of the Labour Party, having won 55% of the vote. Kelly became noted for his outspoken style following his election as leader. In May 2020, he appeared to rule out going into a coalition government.

He announced his resignation as party leader on 2 March 2022, citing a lack of confidence in his leadership from party colleagues. He announced he would stay on as leader until a replacement was appointed, and would remain as a TD for Tipperary. Following an uncontested election, Ivana Bacik succeeded Kelly on 24 March.

==== After leadership (2022-) ====
Kelly was re-elected to the Dáil from the new Tipperary North constituency in 2024. In the 34th Dáil, Kelly serves as Labour's spokesperson on Justice, Home Affairs and Migration.

In August 2025, Kelly publicly disagreed with the Labour Party's decision to support Catherine Connolly in the 2025 Irish presidential election. Connolly left the Labour Party in 2006 and had said the party lost its soul while in government during the 31st Dáil. He also criticised Connolly on foreign relations. Kelly subsequently privately expressed “regret” to party colleagues for confusion or concern caused by his remarks, but did not walk back his comments. In October, he said he "reluctantly" planned to vote for Heather Humphreys in the election, Fine Gael's candidate. Connolly went on to win the election.

== Personal life ==
Kelly is married to Regina O'Connor, a primary school teacher who was raised in Waterville, County Kerry. The couple have two children; a daughter and a son. His brother is former US Special Envoy for Northern Ireland and former CEO of Teneo, Declan Kelly. He is the author of A Political History of County Tipperary 1916–1997 and has won numerous rugby and hurling medals according to his Labour Party summary.

Kelly co-owns a racing greyhound named "Akay Forty Seven". During a Dáil debate in December 2020, Kelly said that "with regard to greyhound people, many of whom are working-class people, greyhounds are effectively their horses". He did not support a Social Democrats motion seeking to end State funding of the industry.

As of 2021, Kelly owned a holiday home in County Kerry, that he let out using Airbnb. In an interview with Pat Kenny on Newstalk, he stated that "I have an issue with Airbnb in urban areas, rather than rural areas." According to the Irish Independent, it was used for short-term letting. He added that the house is based in "a small population area", but felt that Airbnbs in urban areas were in need of regulation.

Political offices
New office	Minister of State at the Department of Transport, Tourism and Sport; 2011–2014	Succeeded by Ann Phelan
Preceded by Phil Hogan	Minister for the Environment, Community and Local Government; 2014–2016	Succeeded by Simon Coveney as Minister for Housing, Planning, Community and Local Government
Party political offices
Preceded by Joan Burton	Deputy leader of Labour Party; 2014–2016	Position abolished
Preceded by Brendan Howlin	Leader of the Labour Party; 2020–2022	Succeeded by Ivana Bacik

Dáil	Election	Deputy (Party)	Deputy (Party)	Deputy (Party)
13th	1948	Patrick Kinane (CnaP)	Mary Ryan (FF)	Daniel Morrissey (FG)
14th	1951	John Fanning (FF)	Mary Ryan (FF)	Daniel Morrissey (FG)
15th	1954	John Fanning (FF)	Mary Ryan (FF)	Daniel Morrissey (FG)
16th	1957	John Fanning (FF)	Mary Ryan (FF)	Patrick Tierney (Lab)
17th	1961	John Fanning (FF)	Thomas Dunne (FG)	Patrick Tierney (Lab)
18th	1965	John Fanning (FF)	Thomas Dunne (FG)	Patrick Tierney (Lab)
19th	1969	Michael O'Kennedy (FF)	Thomas Dunne (FG)	Michael Smith (FF)
20th	1973	Michael O'Kennedy (FF)	Thomas Dunne (FG)	John Ryan (Lab)
21st	1977	Michael O'Kennedy (FF)	Michael Smith (FF)	John Ryan (Lab)
22nd	1981	David Molony (FG)	Michael Smith (FF)	John Ryan (Lab)
23rd	1982 (Feb)	David Molony (FG)	Michael O'Kennedy (FF)	John Ryan (Lab)
24th	1982 (Nov)	David Molony (FG)	Michael O'Kennedy (FF)	John Ryan (Lab)
25th	1987	Michael Lowry (FG)	Michael O'Kennedy (FF)	Michael Smith (FF)
26th	1989	Michael Lowry (FG)	Michael O'Kennedy (FF)	Michael Smith (FF)
27th	1992	Michael Lowry (FG)	John Ryan (Lab)	Michael Smith (FF)
28th	1997	Michael Lowry (Ind.)	Michael O'Kennedy (FF)	Michael Smith (FF)
29th	2002	Michael Lowry (Ind.)	Máire Hoctor (FF)	Michael Smith (FF)
30th	2007	Michael Lowry (Ind.)	Máire Hoctor (FF)	Noel Coonan (FG)
31st	2011	Michael Lowry (Ind.)	Alan Kelly (Lab)	Noel Coonan (FG)
32nd	2016	Constituency abolished. See Tipperary and Offaly		

Dáil	Election	Deputy (Party)	Deputy (Party)	Deputy (Party)
34th	2024	Michael Lowry (Ind.)	Alan Kelly (Lab)	Ryan O'Meara (FF)

Dáil	Election	Deputy (Party)	Deputy (Party)	Deputy (Party)	Deputy (Party)	Deputy (Party)	Deputy (Party)	Deputy (Party)
4th	1923	Dan Breen (Rep)	Séamus Burke (CnaG)	Louis Dalton (CnaG)	Daniel Morrissey (Lab)	Patrick Ryan (Rep)	Michael Heffernan (FP)	Seán McCurtin (CnaG)
5th	1927 (Jun)	Seán Hayes (FF)	Séamus Burke (CnaG)	John Hassett (CnaG)	Daniel Morrissey (Lab)	William O'Brien (Lab)	Michael Heffernan (FP)	Andrew Fogarty (FF)
6th	1927 (Sep)	Seán Hayes (FF)	Séamus Burke (CnaG)	John Hassett (CnaG)	Daniel Morrissey (Lab)	Timothy Sheehy (FF)	Michael Heffernan (FP)	Andrew Fogarty (FF)
7th	1932	Seán Hayes (FF)	Séamus Burke (CnaG)	John Hassett (CnaG)	Daniel Morrissey (Ind.)	Timothy Sheehy (FF)	Dan Breen (FF)	Andrew Fogarty (FF)
8th	1933	Seán Hayes (FF)	Séamus Burke (CnaG)	Richard Curran (NCP)	Daniel Morrissey (CnaG)	Martin Ryan (FF)	Dan Breen (FF)	Andrew Fogarty (FF)
9th	1937	William O'Brien (Lab)	Séamus Burke (FG)	Jeremiah Ryan (FG)	Daniel Morrissey (FG)	Martin Ryan (FF)	Dan Breen (FF)	Andrew Fogarty (FF)
10th	1938	Frank Loughman (FF)	Richard Curran (FG)	Jeremiah Ryan (FG)	Daniel Morrissey (FG)	Martin Ryan (FF)	Dan Breen (FF)	Andrew Fogarty (FF)
11th	1943	Richard Stapleton (Lab)	William O'Donnell (CnaT)	Jeremiah Ryan (FG)	Daniel Morrissey (FG)	Martin Ryan (FF)	Dan Breen (FF)	Andrew Fogarty (FF)
12th	1944	Frank Loughman (FF)	William O'Donnell (CnaT)	Richard Mulcahy (FG)	Daniel Morrissey (FG)	Mary Ryan (FF)	Dan Breen (FF)	Andrew Fogarty (FF)
12th	1947 by-election	Frank Loughman (FF)	Patrick Kinane (CnaP)	Richard Mulcahy (FG)	Daniel Morrissey (FG)	Mary Ryan (FF)	Dan Breen (FF)	Andrew Fogarty (FF)
13th	1948	Constituency abolished. See Tipperary North and Tipperary South						

Dáil	Election	Deputy (Party)	Deputy (Party)	Deputy (Party)	Deputy (Party)	Deputy (Party)
32nd	2016	Séamus Healy (WUA)	Alan Kelly (Lab)	Jackie Cahill (FF)	Michael Lowry (Ind.)	Mattie McGrath (Ind.)
33rd	2020	Martin Browne (SF)	Alan Kelly (Lab)	Jackie Cahill (FF)	Michael Lowry (Ind.)	Mattie McGrath (Ind.)
34th	2024	Constituency abolished. See Tipperary North and Tipperary South				
