= Brendan Howlin =

Irish former politician (born 1956)

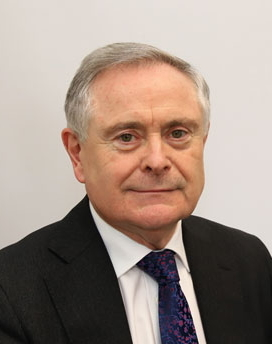
- Howlin in 2020

Leader of the Labour Party
- In office 20 May 2016 – 3 April 2020
- Preceded by: Joan Burton
- Succeeded by: Alan Kelly

Minister for Public Expenditure and Reform
- In office 9 March 2011 – 6 May 2016
- Taoiseach: Enda Kenny
- Preceded by: New office
- Succeeded by: Paschal Donohoe

Leas-Cheann Comhairle of Dáil Éireann
- In office 26 June 2007 – 9 March 2011
- Ceann Comhairle: John O'Donoghue; Séamus Kirk
- Preceded by: Séamus Pattison
- Succeeded by: Michael Kitt

Deputy leader of the Labour Party
- In office 13 November 1997 – 25 October 2002
- Leader: Ruairi Quinn
- Preceded by: Ruairi Quinn
- Succeeded by: Liz McManus

Minister for the Environment
- In office 14 December 1994 – 26 June 1997
- Taoiseach: John Bruton
- Preceded by: Michael Smith
- Succeeded by: Noel Dempsey

Minister for Health
- In office 12 January 1993 – 17 November 1994
- Taoiseach: Albert Reynolds
- Preceded by: John O'Connell
- Succeeded by: Michael Woods

Teachta Dála
- In office February 1987 – November 2024
- Constituency: Wexford

Senator
- In office 12 February 1983 – 30 February 1987
- Constituency: Nominated by the Taoiseach

Personal details
- Born: 9 May 1956 (age 70) Wexford, Ireland
- Party: Labour Party
- Education: St Patrick's College, Dublin
- Website: brendanhowlin.ie

Brendan Howlin (born 9 May 1956) is an Irish former Labour Party politician who served as Leader of the Labour Party from 2016 to 2020, Minister for Public Expenditure and Reform from 2011 to 2016, Leas-Cheann Comhairle from 2007 to 2011, deputy leader of the Labour Party from 1997 to 2002, Minister for the Environment from 1994 to 1997 and Minister for Health from 1993 to 1994. He was a Teachta Dála (TD) for the Wexford constituency from 1987 to 2024. He also served as a Senator from 1983 to 1987, after being nominated by the Taoiseach.

== Early life ==
Born into a political family in Wexford, Howlin is the son of John and Molly Howlin (née Dunbar), and was named after Brendan Corish, the local Labour TD and later leader of the Labour Party. Howlin's father John was a trade union official who served as secretary of the Irish Transport and General Workers' Union, in Wexford, for 40 years. He also secured election as a Labour member of Wexford Corporation, where he served for eighteen years, and was also an election agent to Brendan Corish. Howlin's mother was also strongly involved in local Labour politics. Howlin's brother Ted is a former member of Wexford County Council and Lord Mayor of Wexford. Howlin was raised on William Street in Wexford town with his three siblings.

Howlin grew up in Wexford town and was educated locally in the Faythe and at Wexford CBS. He later attended St Patrick's College, Drumcondra, Dublin, where he was student union president, and qualified as a primary school teacher. During his career as a teacher he was chairman of the Irish National Teachers' Organisation's Wexford branch.

== Political career ==
=== Anti-nuclear movement (1978–1982) ===
Howlin credits his introduction to politics to his involvement in the Irish anti-nuclear movement. The chair of Nuclear Opposition Wexford, Howlin was involved in the organisation of a protest against the building of a nuclear power plant in Carnsore Point, which drew 40,000 protestors. In 1979, Howlin was asked to run for Wexford Corporation and was selected in his absence, but declined to run to continue as chair of NOW.

=== Early years (1982–1993) ===
Howlin initially put his name forward to contest the February 1982 general election for the Labour Party, but withdrew his name from consideration before the selection convention. He contested his first general election at the November 1982 election in the Wexford constituency, but despite the existence of a large left-wing vote in the area, Howlin was not elected. Despite this setback, a Fine Gael-Labour Party coalition government came to power and he was nominated by the Taoiseach Garret FitzGerald to serve in Seanad Éireann as a Senator. Howlin secured election to Wexford County Council in 1985 and served as Mayor of Wexford in 1986.

In 1987, the Labour Party withdrew from the coalition government and a general election was called. Howlin once again contested a seat in Wexford and was elected to Dáil Éireann. Labour was out of office as a Fianna Fáil government took office. Despite his recent entry to the Dáil, Howlin was subsequently named Chief Whip of the Labour Party, a position he held until 1993.

=== Cabinet minister (1993–1997) ===
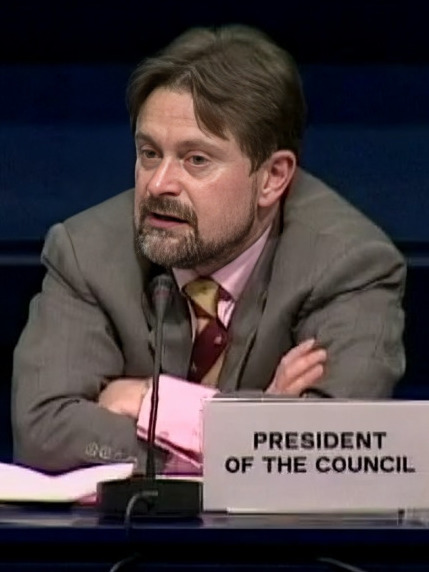
Howlin in 1996

The 1992 general election resulted in a hung Dáil once again; however, the Labour Party enjoyed their best result to date at the time. After negotiations, a Fianna Fáil-Labour Party coalition government came to office. Howlin joined the cabinet of Taoiseach Albert Reynolds, as Minister for Health. During his tenure the development of a four-year health strategy, the identifying of HIV/AIDS prevention as a priority and the securing of a £35 million investment in childcare were advanced. Howlin, however, was also targeted by anti-abortion groups after introducing an act which would allow abortion information.

In 1994, the Labour Party withdrew from the government after a disagreement over the appointment of Attorney General Harry Whelehan as a Judge of the High Court and President of the High Court. However, no general election was called and, while it was hoped that the coalition could be revived under the new Fianna Fáil leader Bertie Ahern, the arithmetic of the Dáil now allowed the Labour Party to open discussions with other opposition parties. After negotiations a Rainbow Coalition came to power involving Fine Gael, Labour and Democratic Left. In John Bruton's cabinet, he became Minister for the Environment.

=== Leadership contender (1997) ===
Following the 1997 general election, a Fianna Fáil-Progressive Democrats coalition government came to power and the Labour Party returned to the opposition benches. In the announcement of the party's new front bench, Howlin retained responsibility for the Environment.

In late 1997, Dick Spring resigned as leader of the Labour Party and Howlin immediately threw his hat into the ring in the subsequent leadership election. In a choice between Howlin and Ruairi Quinn, the former gained some early support; however, the leadership eventually went to Quinn by a significant majority. As a show of unity, Howlin was later named deputy leader of the party and retained his brief as Spokesperson for the Environment and Local Government.

=== Leadership contender (2002) ===
In 2002, following Quinn's resignation as party leader after Labour's relatively unsuccessful 2002 general election campaign, Howlin again stood for the party leadership. For the second time in five years Howlin was defeated for the leadership of the party, this time by Pat Rabbitte, who was formerly a leading figure in Democratic Left. Howlin was succeeded as deputy leader by Liz McManus.

While having been publicly supportive of Rabbitte's leadership, he was perceived as being the leader of the wing of the party which was sceptical of Rabbitte's policy about future coalition with Fianna Fáil. Rabbitte explicitly ruled out any future coalition with Fianna Fáil, instead forming a formal alliance with Fine Gael in the run-up to the 2007 general election (the so-called Mullingar Accord).

=== Leas-Cheann Comhairle (2007–2011) ===
On 26 June 2007, Howlin was appointed the Leas-Cheann Comhairle (deputy chairperson) of Dáil Éireann.

=== Cabinet minister (2011–2016) ===
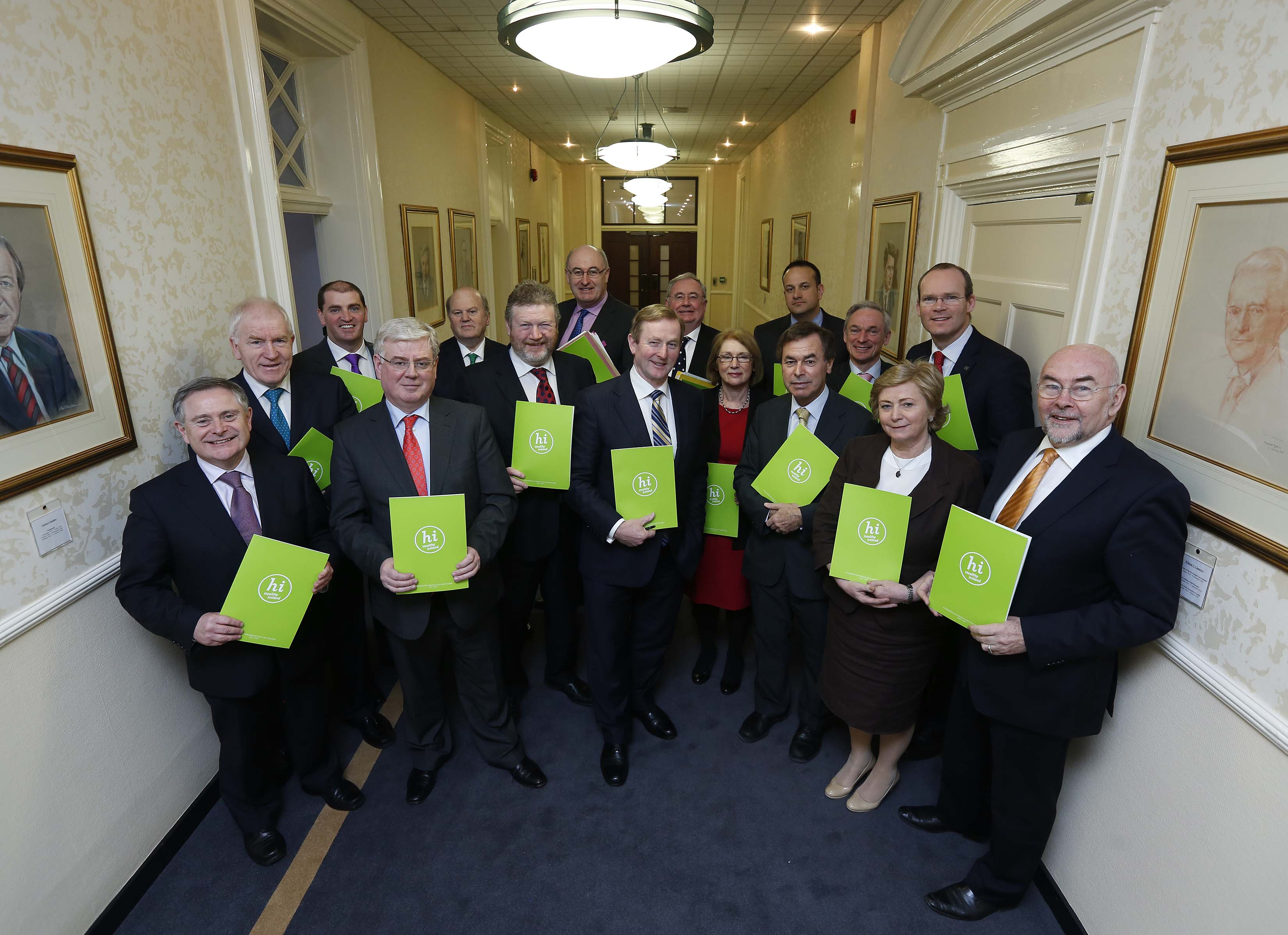
Howlin (front left) in 2013.

After the 2011 general election, Fine Gael and the Labour Party formed a government, Howlin was appointed to the new office of Minister for Public Expenditure and Reform. In May 2011, he said that over the next 20 years, the number of people in Ireland over 65 is set to increase by almost half a million, a situation that could see the annual health budget soar – rising by €12.5 billion in the next decade alone. While reform was a major part of government attempts "to regain full sovereignty over economic policy", Howlin told a meeting of the Association of Chief Executives of State Agencies they would in any event face key "imperatives" in coming years. He said a new public spending review, on which he had briefed the cabinet in recent days, would not be a simple assessment of where to make cuts, but would also consider the way public sector services were delivered. Howlin reiterated the government's commitment not to cut public sector pay, "if the Croke Park Agreement works". "These are just some of the challenges that our society is facing in the coming decade – crisis or no crisis. In the good times, tackling them was going to be difficult. Today, in these difficult times, tackling them is going to be imperative." Howlin said Ireland was facing a profound and complex economic crisis "where we are fighting a battle on three fronts – mass unemployment, a major failure in banking, and a fiscal crisis".

==== Analysis of budgets ====
Budgets 2012 to 2016 - introduced in part by Brendan Howlin as Minister for Public Expenditure and supported by Labour - were described by the Economic and Social Research Institute (ESRI) as "regressive".

It found that "Budget 2012 involved greater proportionate losses for those on low incomes: reductions of about 2 to 2½ per cent for those with the lowest incomes, as against losses of about ¾ of a per cent for those on the highest incomes".

By contrast, the ESRI found earlier budgets in 2008–2010 to be "strongly progressive" because before 2011 "Losses imposed by policy changes in tax and welfare have been greatest for those on the highest incomes, and smaller for those on low incomes".

However, it concluded "Budget 2014 had its greatest impact – a reduction of 2 per cent – on low-income groups". The ESRI described Budget 2015 as having a "pattern of losses in the bottom half of the income distribution, declining as income rises, and gains in the upper reaches", which "can clearly be described as regressive".

=== Labour Party leadership (2016–2020) ===
Howlin retained his seat in the Dáil following the 2016 general election, though only six of his Labour colleagues did likewise and the party returned to the opposition benches. Following the resignation of Joan Burton, Howlin contested the 2016 Labour Party leadership election unopposed and was elected Leader of the Labour Party on 20 May 2016.

In March 2018, Howlin criticised Taoiseach Leo Varadkar for failing to personally invite him to accompany Varadkar as he met ambulance crews in Howlin's constituency of Wexford. Varadkar replied that he had been far too busy dealing with the recent weather crisis and Brexit "to organise invitations to Deputies personally in order that they [Howlin] felt included". It was separately said of Howlin's complaint "It appears that the Taoiseach, the chief executive of the State, needs the imprimatur of local politicians when he enters their bailiwick, and needs to be accompanied and monitored by those same politicians while he is in their realm."

==== Leadership challenge ====
Alan Kelly challenged Howlin for the party leadership in 2018, stating that he had failed to 'turn the ship around'. Howlin stated that Kelly's comments were a disappointing and unnecessary distraction. Howlin also said that there was not a single parliamentary party member who supported the challenge and that Kelly had the backing of a minority of councillors. Howlin told The Irish Times that there was no formal proposition made to the Central Council (which would deal with any formal leadership challenge).

==== 2020 general election ====
In September 2018, Howlin stated that winning 14 seats in the 33rd Dail was a realistic goal. During the campaign in 2020, Howlin stated that his wish to end the U.S.A's use of Shannon airport for military related activities. In the 2020 general election party first preference vote dropped to 4.4% of first preference votes and returned 6 seats - a record low. Howlin announced his intention to step down as leader on the 12 February 2020. He also said that the Labour Party should not formally enter government, a view that was backed by the parliamentary party. He also stated that he would not back any candidate in the following contest. On 15 February 2020, Howlin ruled himself out as a candidate for Ceann Comhairle of the 33rd Dail, with the polling day to elect his successor set for 3 April 2020.

=== After leadership (2020–2024) ===
In 2020, Howlin's legislation (Harassment, Harmful Communications and Related Offences Bill) was passed and signed into law by Michael D. Higgins. This bill made the distribution of intimate images or "revenge porn" a criminal offence, and made other forms of cyber-bullying and harassment punishable.

On 6 October 2023, Howlin announced that he would not contest the next general election.

== Personal life ==
Howlin is a single man. He has spoken publicly of receiving hate mail relating to his private life and questioning his sexual orientation. In an interview with The Star during the 2002 Labour Party leadership contest, in response to repeated speculation, he announced he was "not gay".

Political offices
Preceded by John O'Connell	Minister for Health; 1993–1994	Succeeded by Michael Woods
Preceded by Michael Smith	Minister for the Environment; 1994–1997	Succeeded by Noel Dempsey
Preceded by Séamus Pattison	Leas-Cheann Comhairle of Dáil Éireann; 2007–2011	Succeeded by Michael Kitt
New office	Minister for Public Expenditure and Reform; 2011–2016	Succeeded by Paschal Donohoe
Party political offices
Preceded by Ruairi Quinn	Deputy leader of the Labour Party; 1997–2002	Succeeded by Liz McManus
Preceded by Joan Burton	Leader of the Labour Party; 2016–2020	Succeeded by Alan Kelly

Dáil	Election	Deputy (Party)	Deputy (Party)	Deputy (Party)	Deputy (Party)	Deputy (Party)
2nd	1921	Richard Corish (SF)	James Ryan (SF)	Séamus Doyle (SF)	Seán Etchingham (SF)	4 seats 1921–1923
3rd	1922	Richard Corish (Lab)	Daniel O'Callaghan (Lab)	Séamus Doyle (AT-SF)	Michael Doyle (FP)	4 seats 1921–1923
4th	1923	Richard Corish (Lab)	James Ryan (Rep)	Robert Lambert (Rep)	Michael Doyle (FP)	Osmond Esmonde (CnaG)
5th	1927 (Jun)	Richard Corish (Lab)	James Ryan (FF)	James Shannon (Lab)	Michael Doyle (FP)	John Keating (NL)
6th	1927 (Sep)	Richard Corish (Lab)	James Ryan (FF)	Denis Allen (FF)	Michael Jordan (FP)	Osmond Esmonde (CnaG)
7th	1932	Richard Corish (Lab)	James Ryan (FF)	Denis Allen (FF)	John Keating (CnaG)	Osmond Esmonde (CnaG)
8th	1933	Richard Corish (Lab)	James Ryan (FF)	Patrick Kehoe (FF)	John Keating (CnaG)	Osmond Esmonde (CnaG)
8th	1936 by-election	Richard Corish (Lab)	James Ryan (FF)	Patrick Kehoe (FF)	John Keating (CnaG)	Denis Allen (FF)
9th	1937	Richard Corish (Lab)	James Ryan (FF)	John Keating (FG)	John Esmonde (FG)	Denis Allen (FF)
10th	1938	Richard Corish (Lab)	James Ryan (FF)	John Keating (FG)	John Esmonde (FG)	Denis Allen (FF)
11th	1943	Richard Corish (Lab)	James Ryan (FF)	John O'Leary (Lab)	John Esmonde (FG)	Denis Allen (FF)
12th	1944	Richard Corish (Lab)	James Ryan (FF)	John O'Leary (NLP)	John Keating (FG)	Denis Allen (FF)
12th	1945 by-election	Brendan Corish (Lab)	James Ryan (FF)	John O'Leary (NLP)	John Keating (FG)	Denis Allen (FF)
13th	1948	Brendan Corish (Lab)	James Ryan (FF)	John O'Leary (NLP)	John Esmonde (FG)	Denis Allen (FF)
14th	1951	Brendan Corish (Lab)	James Ryan (FF)	John O'Leary (Lab)	Anthony Esmonde (FG)	Denis Allen (FF)
15th	1954	Brendan Corish (Lab)	James Ryan (FF)	John O'Leary (Lab)	Anthony Esmonde (FG)	Denis Allen (FF)
16th	1957	Brendan Corish (Lab)	James Ryan (FF)	Seán Browne (FF)	Anthony Esmonde (FG)	Denis Allen (FF)
17th	1961	Brendan Corish (Lab)	James Ryan (FF)	Lorcan Allen (FF)	Anthony Esmonde (FG)	4 seats 1961–1981
18th	1965	Brendan Corish (Lab)	James Kennedy (FF)	Lorcan Allen (FF)	Anthony Esmonde (FG)	4 seats 1961–1981
19th	1969	Brendan Corish (Lab)	Seán Browne (FF)	Lorcan Allen (FF)	Anthony Esmonde (FG)	4 seats 1961–1981
20th	1973	Brendan Corish (Lab)	Seán Browne (FF)	Lorcan Allen (FF)	John Esmonde (FG)	4 seats 1961–1981
21st	1977	Brendan Corish (Lab)	Seán Browne (FF)	Lorcan Allen (FF)	Michael D'Arcy (FG)	4 seats 1961–1981
22nd	1981	Brendan Corish (Lab)	Ivan Yates (FG)	Lorcan Allen (FF)	Michael D'Arcy (FG)	Hugh Byrne (FF)
23rd	1982 (Feb)	Seán Browne (FF)	Ivan Yates (FG)	Lorcan Allen (FF)	Michael D'Arcy (FG)	Hugh Byrne (FF)
24th	1982 (Nov)	Avril Doyle (FG)	Ivan Yates (FG)	John Browne (FF)	Michael D'Arcy (FG)	Hugh Byrne (FF)
25th	1987	Avril Doyle (FG)	Ivan Yates (FG)	John Browne (FF)	Brendan Howlin (Lab)	Hugh Byrne (FF)
26th	1989	Michael D'Arcy (FG)	Ivan Yates (FG)	John Browne (FF)	Brendan Howlin (Lab)	Séamus Cullimore (FF)
27th	1992	Avril Doyle (FG)	Ivan Yates (FG)	John Browne (FF)	Brendan Howlin (Lab)	Hugh Byrne (FF)
28th	1997	Michael D'Arcy (FG)	Ivan Yates (FG)	John Browne (FF)	Brendan Howlin (Lab)	Hugh Byrne (FF)
29th	2002	Paul Kehoe (FG)	Liam Twomey (Ind.)	John Browne (FF)	Brendan Howlin (Lab)	Tony Dempsey (FF)
30th	2007	Paul Kehoe (FG)	Michael W. D'Arcy (FG)	John Browne (FF)	Brendan Howlin (Lab)	Seán Connick (FF)
31st	2011	Paul Kehoe (FG)	Liam Twomey (FG)	John Browne (FF)	Brendan Howlin (Lab)	Mick Wallace (Ind.)
32nd	2016	Paul Kehoe (FG)	Michael W. D'Arcy (FG)	James Browne (FF)	Brendan Howlin (Lab)	Mick Wallace (I4C)
32nd	2019 by-election	Paul Kehoe (FG)	Michael W. D'Arcy (FG)	James Browne (FF)	Brendan Howlin (Lab)	Malcolm Byrne (FF)
33rd	2020	Paul Kehoe (FG)	Verona Murphy (Ind.)	James Browne (FF)	Brendan Howlin (Lab)	Johnny Mythen (SF)
34th	2024	4 seats since 2024	Verona Murphy (Ind.)	James Browne (FF)	George Lawlor (Lab)	Johnny Mythen (SF)
