= List of people from County Mayo =

County Mayo is a county in Ireland, it is the third-largest in Ireland and the second-largest in the province of Connacht. Mayo has produced many noted artists, entertainers, politicians and businesspeople. Included are people affiliated with Mayo before the creation of the Republic of Ireland.

== List of people from County Mayo ==
=== Writers, composers and philosophers ===
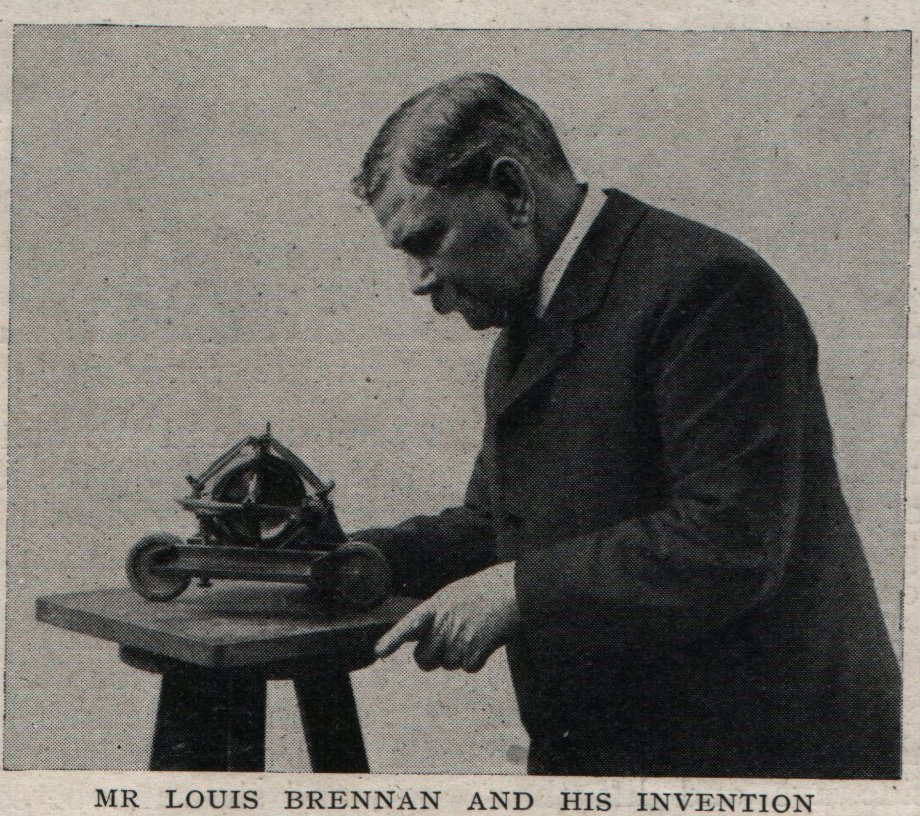
Louis Brennan

- George A. Birmingham (1865–1950) – Author (The Seething Pot 1905), (Hyacinth, 1906)
- Ulick Bourke (1829–1887) – Scholar and founder of the Gaelic Union
- Louis Brennan (1852–1932) – Invented the Brennan torpedo
- Richard Douthwaite (1942–2011) – Economist, ecologist, campaigner and writer
- Paul Durcan (1944–2025) – Poet
- Áine Greaney (born c. 1962) – Writer and editor
- John Healy (1930–1991) – Author and journalist
- Sally Rooney (born 1991) – Author, screenwriter, Conversations with Friends (2017) and Normal People (2018)

=== Entertainers ===
- Karen Koster (born 1981) – presenter for Virgin Media Television.
- Joseph Maher (1933–1998) – character actor, playwright and director
- Margaret Burke Sheridan (1889–1958) – opera singer
- Aoibhinn Ní Shúilleabháin (born 1983) – winner of the 2005 Rose of Tralee contest. She is first Rose from County Mayo.
- Jos Vantyler (born 1991) – actor known for his work in classical theatre
- Louis Walsh (born 1952) – entertainment manager and judge on British television talent show The X Factor and Ireland's Got Talent

=== Politicians and leaders ===
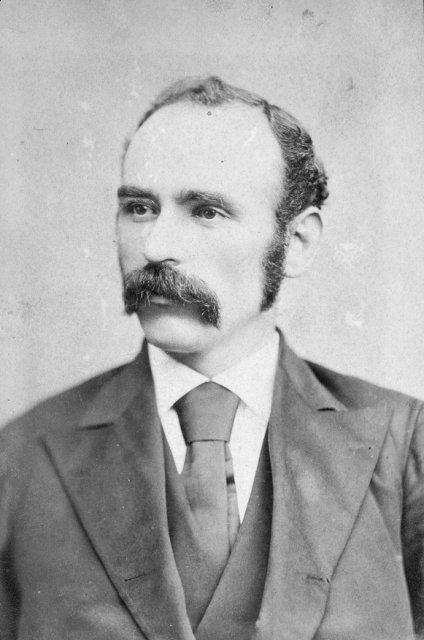
Michael Davitt

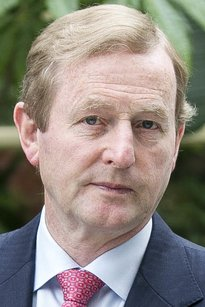
Enda Kenny

- Richard Bourke, 6th Earl of Mayo (1822–1872) – Viceroy of India (1869–1872)
- Dara Calleary – Fianna Fáil politician
- Seán Calleary (1931–2018) – Fianna Fáil politician
- Lucinda Creighton – former politician, leader and founder of Renua (2015–2016)
- Lisa Chambers – Fianna Fáil politician
- Rose Conway-Walsh
- Jerry Cowley – barrister, medical doctor and politician
- Michael Davitt (1846–1906) – Irish republican, agrarian campaigner, labour leader, Home Rule politician and Member of Parliament (MP) who founded the Irish National Land League. The bridge to Achill is named after him as well as one of Castlebar's local secondary schools, (Davitt College).
- Bernard Durkan
- Seán Flanagan (1922–1993) – Fianna Fáil politician and Gaelic footballer. Served as Minister for Health (1966–1969) and Minister for Lands (1969–1973).
- Beverley Flynn – former Fianna Fáil politician
- Pádraig Flynn – former Fianna Fáil politician and Minister
- Denis Gallagher
- Charles Haughey (1925–2006) – former Taoiseach of Ireland
- Jim Higgins (born 1945) - former Fine Gael politician
- Enda Kenny – politician, leader of Fine Gael (2002–2017), and Taoiseach (2011–2017)
- Tom Maguire – Veteran of the Irish War of Independence and Irish Civil War. TD for South Mayo in the 1920s, Vice President of Sinn Féin in the 1930s.
- Michelle Mulherin
- Catherine Noone
- Marie-Louise O'Donnell
- Paul O'Dwyer (1907–1998) – President of New York City Council, prominent New York City human rights attorney, supporter of Irish nationalism, and defender of several Irishmen from deportation, including "The Fort Worth Five" and Vincent Conlon
- William O'Dwyer (1890– 1964) – 100th mayor of New York City (1946–1950)
- John O'Mahony
- Pat Rabbitte – former leader of the Labour Party
- Michael Ring – Fine Gael politician, Minister for Rural and Community Development (2017–2020)
- Mary Robinson – first female President of Ireland (1990–1997), United Nations High Commissioner for Human Rights
- P. J. Ruttledge – founding Member of Fianna Fáil, Minister for Justice during the 1930s
- William Joyce Sewell – Unionist colonel during American Civil War and US senator for New Jersey
- John Solon (died 1921) – member of the Wisconsin State Assembly
- Emmet Stagg
- Myles Staunton
- Thomas Thornton – member of the Wisconsin State Assembly

=== Soldiers ===
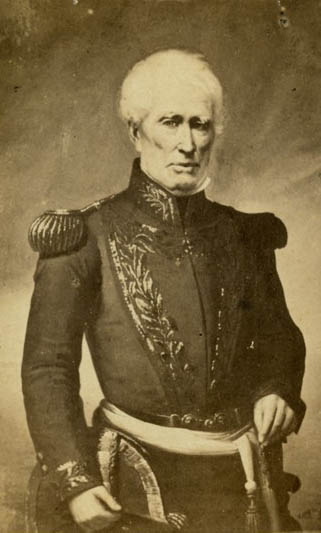
Guillermo Brown

- Admiral William Brown (1777–1857) – founder of the Argentine Navy
- William M. Browne – Commander and Statesman in the Confederate States of America
- Frank Durkan (1930–2006) – Irish–American human rights attorney best known for having represented numerous members of the Provisional Irish Republican Army (IRA)
- Mike Flanagan – Fought with the British Army during World War II before defecting to the Israeli Defence Forces in 1948, where he was a founder of the Israeli Armored Corps
- Flidais – the heroine of the Ulster Cycle Erris legend of the Táin Bó Flidhais
- Michael Gaughan (1949–1974) – IRA Volunteer
- Philip Gaughan (1865–1913) – first Irish-American to receive the Congressional Medal of Honor during the Spanish–American War
- John Hennen – FRSE military surgeon
- Ernie O'Malley (1897–1957) – prominent officer in the Irish Republican Army during the Irish War of Independence and on the anti-Treaty side in the Irish Civil War; also a writer
- Gráinne O'Malley – 16th-century pirate queen and chieftain of the clan O'Malley, also known as Granuaile.
- Mark Mellett – current Chief of Staff of the Irish Defence Forces
- John MacBride – (1868 – 1916) Irish republican and military leader executed by the British for his participation in the 1916 Irish Easter Rising
- Patrick McHale – Soldier in the British Army and recipient of the Victoria Cross
- Maurice George Moore – Served with the Connaught Rangers in South Africa during the Xhosa Wars, the Anglo-Zulu War and the Second Boer War. Later denounced British actions in South Africa and became an Irish Nationalist. Served as a Fianna Fáil senator.
- Frank Stagg (1942–1976) – Member of the Irish Republican Army who went on a hunger strike

=== Sport ===
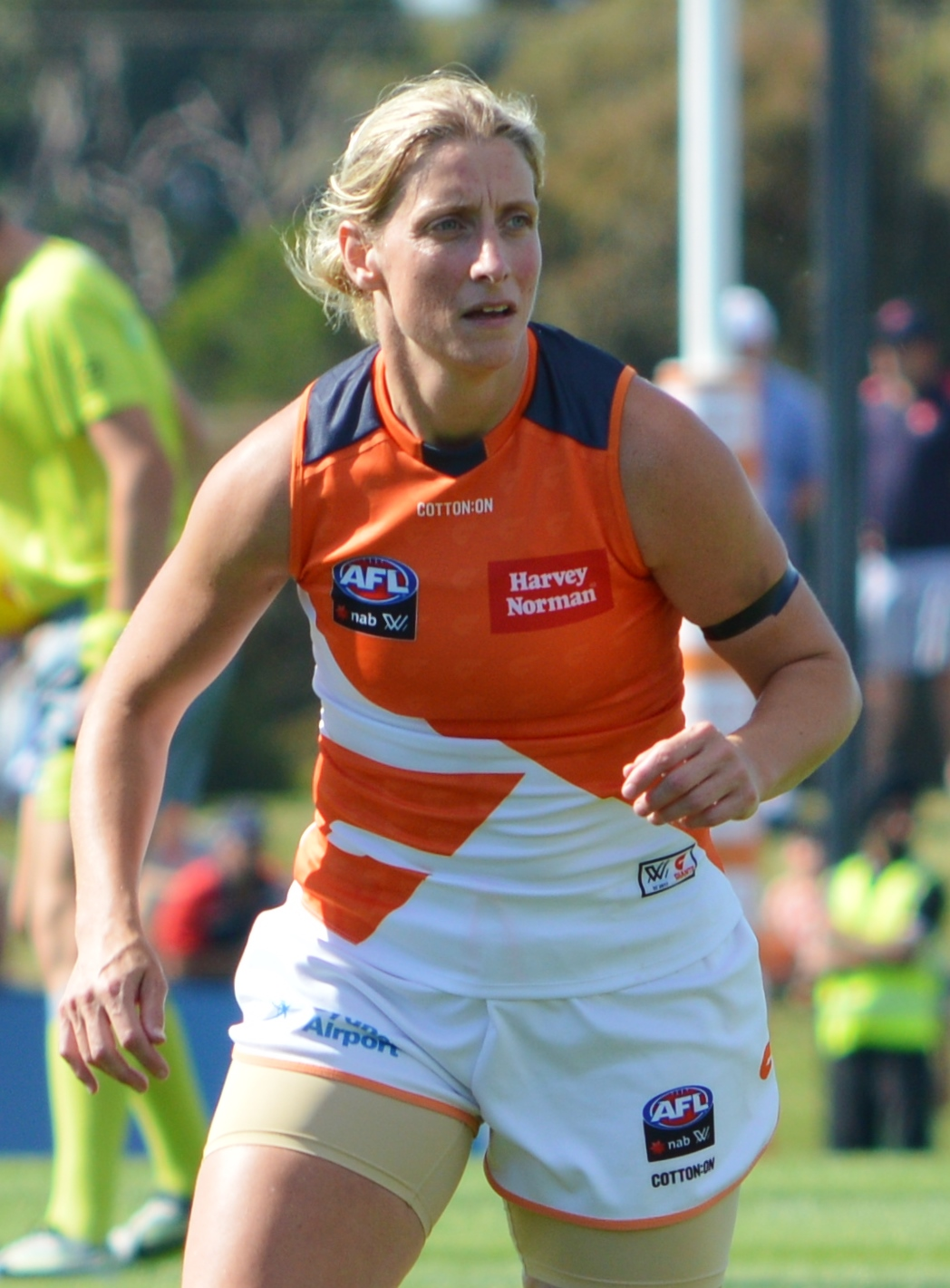
Cora Staunton

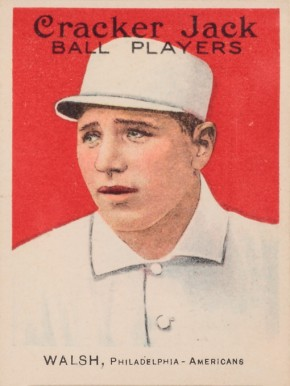
Jimmy Walsh

- Chris Barrett – Gaelic footballer
- Pádraig Carney (1928–2019) – Gaelic footballer, known as the "Flying Doctor"
- Ryan Connolly (born 1992) – Association footballer (Sligo Rovers, Galway United, Finn Harps)
- David Clarke, Gaelic footballer
- Alan Dillon (born 1982) – Gaelic footballer for Mayo (2003–2017). He is also a TD for the Mayo constituency since 2020.
- Sinead Diver (born 1977) – naturalised Australian long-distance runner
- Jason Doherty (born 1989) – three time Connacht Senior Football Championship-winning Gaelic footballer for Mayo
- Ger Feeney (c. 1954–2010) – Gaelic footballer for Mayo
- Richie Feeney – Gaelic footballer for Mayo
- Deirdre Gallagher (born 1974) – Olympic race walker
- Ciaran Kelly – footballer (Sligo Rovers)
- Tommy Langan (1921–1974) – Gaelic footballer, full-forward
- Ciarán McDonald – Gaelic football player
- John McDonnell – athletics coach. He has won more national championships (42) than any coach in any sport in the history of American collegiate athletics.
- Kevin McLoughlin (born 1988) – National Football League-winning Gaelic footballer for Mayo
- Andy Moran (born 1983) – two-time All-Star Gaelic footballer for Mayo
- Ray Moylette – professional boxer
- Cillian O'Connor – Gaelic footballer for Mayo
- Diarmuid O'Connor – Gaelic footballer for Mayo
- Aidan O'Shea – Gaelic footballer for Mayo
- Nicholas Quinn – Swimmer, competed at the 2016 Summer Olympics
- Martin Sheridan (1881–1918) – five-time Olympic gold medalist, with a total of nine Olympic medals
- Cora Staunton, Gaelic footballer for Mayo (1995–present), All-Ireland winner (1999–2000, 2002–2003), All Star winner (2000–2002, 2004, 2007–2009, 2012–2013, 2015, 2017), association footballer, rugby player and Australian rules footballer, Greater Western Sydney Giants (2017–present)
- Jimmy Walsh (1885–1962) – outfielder for MLB team Boston Red Sox. Won world series in 1916.
- Michaela Walsh (born 1998) – Irish indoor champion hammer thrower and shotputter

=== Others ===
- Patrick Browne (1720–1790) – doctor and botanist of Jamaica
- Frank Carter (1881–1927) – Irish–American serial killer
- Brian Rua U'Cearbhain – 17th-century prophet from Erris
- Thomas Joseph Commons (born 1950) – police officer
- Willie Corduff – Winner of Goldman Environmental Prize 2007
- Micheál de Búrca (1912–1985) – artist
- Michael Feeney, MBE – founder of Mayo Peace Park
- John MacHale (1789–1881) – Archbishop of Tuam, Irish independence leader
- Mael Brigte mac Mothlachain (fl. 649) – assassin
- Niall McGarry – entrepreneur
- Marquess of Sligo (Browne)
- Michael Murphy – broadcaster, journalist, psychoanalyst
- Michael Neary – current archbishop of Tuam

== See also ==
- List of Irish people
