= 1905 in Ireland =

- Centuries: 18th; 19th; 20th; 21st
- Decades: 1880s; 1890s; 1900s; 1910s; 1920s
- See also: 1905 in the United Kingdom; Other events of 1905; List of years in Ireland

Events in the year 1905 in Ireland.

== Events ==
- 9 January – The Lillebonne, the largest vessel ever constructed in Dublin, was successfully launched in the North Wall Yard.
- 16 February – Explosions caused by petrol fumes after refuelling on board the newly commissioned submarine HMS A5 killed six of the eleven crew at the Royal Navy's base in Haulbowline.
- 6 March – The obligation of the Post Office towards letters addressed in Irish was raised in the British House of Commons. The debate arose because the General Post Office in Dublin returned parcels addressed in Irish by the Gaelic League.
- 29 May – Statistics in 1904 showed that nearly 37,000 people emigrated. Since 1851, almost four million people have left the island.
- 7 July – The Drunkenness (Ireland) Bill was debated in the British House of Commons. Irish Members of Parliament criticised the bill on the grounds that it was offensive.
- 28 November – The Sinn Féin party was founded.
- Church House was built in Belfast, home to the General Assembly of the Presbyterian Church in Ireland.

== Arts and literature ==
- February – J. M. Synge's historical play The Well of the Saints was first performed at the Abbey Theatre in Dublin, by the Irish National Theatre Society.
- 23 May – George Bernard Shaw's play Man and Superman was first performed at the Royal Court Theatre in London.
- Padraic Colum's The Land was performed at the Abbey Theatre.
- George A. Birmingham's roman à clef The Seething Pot was published.
- Lord Dunsany's short story sequence The Gods of Pegāna was published.
- Filson Young's novel The Sands of Pleasure was published.
- The traditional hymn Be Thou My Vision was first translated from Old Irish into English by Mary Elizabeth Byrne, in the journal Ériu.

== Sport ==
=== Association football ===
- International
  - 25 February – England 1–1 Ireland (in Middlesbrough)
  - 18 March – Scotland 4–0 Ireland (in Glasgow)
  - 8 April – Ireland 2–2 Wales (in Belfast)
  Irish League
  - Winners: Glentoran F.C.
  Irish Cup
  - Winners: Distillery F.C. 3–0 Shelbourne F.C.
- Windsor Park football ground in Belfast opened with a match between Linfield F.C. and Glentoran F.C.

=== Gaelic Games ===
- The All-Ireland Champions were Kilkenny (hurling) and Kildare (football)

== Births ==
- 2 January – Padraic Fallon, poet (died 1974).
- 23 April – William Conolly-Carew, 6th Baron Carew (died 1994).
- 26 April – Denis O'Dea, actor (died 1978).
- 29 April – George Beamish, rugby player and Royal Air Force air marshal (died 1967 in the United Kingdom)
- 22 May – Mick Ahern, Cork hurler (died 1946).
- 8 June – Brian Coffey, poet and publisher (died 1995).
- 24 June – Michael Scott, architect (died 1989).
- 3 September – Jimmy Dunne, association football player (died 1949).
- 9 September – Jimmy McCambridge, association football player (died 1980 in Northern Ireland).
- 15 September – Pat O'Callaghan, athlete and Olympic gold medallist (died 1991).
- 23 October – Aidan Roark, Irish 10-goal polo player (died 1984)
- 11 December – Erskine Hamilton Childers, Fianna Fáil TD, Cabinet minister and fourth President of Ireland (died 1974).
  Full date unknown
  - P. A. Ó Síocháin, journalist, author and lawyer (died 1995).
  - Jackie Wright, comedian (died 1989 in Northern Ireland).

== Deaths ==
- 12 January – James Mason, chess player and writer (born 1849).
- 9 February – Valentine Browne, 4th Earl of Kenmare, peer (born 1825).
- 14 March – George Fisher, Mayor of Wellington, New Zealand (born 1843).
- 6 April – Henry Benedict Medlicott, geologist (born 1829).
- 24 April – Kivas Tully, architect (born 1820).
- 31 May – Michael N. Nolan, U.S. Representative from New York, mayor of Albany (born 1833).
- 27 June – Harold Mahony, tennis player (born 1867) (bicycle accident).
- 15 July – Kevin Izod O'Doherty, transported to Australia in 1849, physician and politician (born 1823).
- 13 September – Patrick Collins, U.S. Representative from Massachusetts and Mayor of Boston (born 1844).
- 19 September – Dr. Thomas John Barnardo, philanthropist (born 1845).
- 31 October – Bryan O'Loghlen, politician in Australia, 13th Premier of Victoria (born 1828).

== See also ==
- 1905 in Scotland
- 1905 in Wales
