= Mulherin =

Mulherin is a surname. Notable people with the surname include:

- Matthew W. Mulherin (1925–2007), American politician
- Michelle Mulherin (born 1972), Irish politician
- Tim Mulherin (1957–2020), Australian politician
- Wayne Mulherin (born 1957), Australian cricketer
- Joseph Edward Mulherin (born 1992), American rapper and singer
