= General John Regan =

General John Regan may refer to:

- General John Regan (play), a 1913 comedy play
- General John Regan (1921 film), a silent British film adaptation directed by Harold M. Shaw
- General John Regan (1933 film), a British film adaptation directed by Henry Edwards
