= St Gerald's College, Castlebar =

- Coláiste Gearóid Naofa

Location
- Castlebar, County Mayo, Ireland; 53.85741°N 9.30796°W

Information
- Established: 1908
- Principal: Shaun Burke
- Language: English; Irish; French

St Gerald's College is an Irish all-boys De La Salle secondary school located in Castlebar, County Mayo. The original school was opened in 1908. The current school was opened in 1971. As of December 2024, the school had 626 students. In 2009, the school celebrated its centenary. An extension was added to the school, and opened in 2013.

== Notable alumni ==
- Enda Kenny (b. 1951) - former politician, Taoiseach of Ireland (2011–2017), and Leader of Fine Gael (2002–2017)
- Micheál de Búrca (1912–1985), artist
- Tom Coll, drummer for Fontaines D.C.
- Conor Deegan III, bass player for Fontaines D.C.
- John Jordan, judge
- Niall McGarry, entrepreneur
- Pádraig Flynn, former Fianna Fáil politician and Minister
- Richie Feeney, Gaelic footballer for Mayo
- Aidan O'Shea, Gaelic footballer for Mayo
- Cillian O'Connor, Gaelic footballer for Mayo
- Nicholas Quinn, Swimmer, competed at the 2016 Summer Olympics
- Ciaran Kelly, footballer.
- Ger Feeney (c. 1954–2010), Gaelic footballer for Mayo
- Martin Carney, Gaelic games commentator for RTÉ.

== See also ==
- Education in the Republic of Ireland
