= Paul Lawless =

Paul Lawless may refer to:

- Paul Lawless (ice hockey)
- Paul Lawless (politician)
