= John Regan =

John Regan may refer to:

- John Regan (bassist), (1951-2023)
- John Keating Regan (1911-1987), U.S. federal judge
- John Regan (footballer) (b. 1944)
- John Regan (rapper), American rapper
- John E. Regan (1883-1946), American politician

== See also ==
- Jonny Regan, TV personality
- Jack Regan (disambiguation)
- John Reagan (disambiguation)
- General John Regan (disambiguation)
