= Ward McAllister (actor) =

American actor

- Occupation: Film actor
- Years active: 1916–1923

Ward McAllister (1891–1981) was an American film actor of the silent era.

Broadway productions in which McAllister performed included The Jeweled Tree (1926). He acted in London and South Africa in addition to his work in the United States.

After McAllister retired he married Irene Reynolds on September 16, 1931, in New York City.

== Selected filmography ==
- General John Regan (1921)
- A Woman of No Importance (1921)
- Cocaine (1922)
- Trapped by the Mormons (1922)
- Repentance (1922)
