= General John Regan (1921 film) =

1921 film

- Directed by: Harold M. Shaw
- Written by: George A. Birmingham (play); William J. Elliott
- Starring: Milton Rosmer; Madge Stuart; Ward McAllister
- Production company: Stoll Pictures
- Distributed by: Stoll Pictures
- Release date: October 1921
- Country: United Kingdom
- Languages: Silent; English intertitles

General John Regan is a 1921 British comedy film directed by Harold M. Shaw and starring Milton Rosmer, Madge Stuart and Ward McAllister.

The film was made by Stoll Pictures at Cricklewood Studios. It is based on the play General John Regan by George A. Birmingham. It was remade as a sound film General John Regan in 1933.

== Cast ==
- Milton Rosmer as Doctor O'Grady
- Madge Stuart as Mary Ellen Doyle
- Edward O'Neill as Tim Doyle
- Ward McAllister as Horace P. Billings
- Bertie Wright as Thady Gallagher
- Teddy Arundell as Police Const. Moriarty
- Robert Vallis as Sergeant Colgan
- Judd Green as Kerrigan
- Gordon Harker as Maj. Kent
- Wyndham Guise as Father McCormack

== Bibliography ==
- Goble, Alan. The Complete Index to Literary Sources in Film. Walter de Gruyter, 1999.
