= S. S. Millard =

American film producer

Sam S. Millard (also known as Elid Stanch) was a filmmaker of the 1920s through the 1950s and 1960s. Nicknamed "Steamship", he was one of the Forty Thieves of exploiters. Considered an early father of the roadshow-style exploitation film circuit, his film productions and presentations laid the groundwork for a number of later exploitation films.

Millard's actual date and place of birth is unknown, but it is believed he is of Romanian descent and was once able to pass himself off as Romanian nobility to a former Romanian queen. While a financially successful individual, he often gave an appearance of a man who struggled to make ends meet. David F. Friedman, an exploitation filmmaker and presenter who worked with Millard in the 1940s and 1950s, described Millard's appearance at a meeting as someone who "did not project an aura of prosperity," with a wrinkled suit and dirty shirt. He gained a reputation for huckstering and making every last dollar he could from his distributors and film buyers, which gained him both respect and resentment from his peers.

Millard mainly dealt with what would now be called exploitation filmmaking. Like most of the genre's films of the time, Millard's movies were typically compilations of other controversial short films, stock footage and medical reels. Millard spent his professional career producing and presenting these films around the US. In one of Millard's most noteworthy presentations, he was forced to retitle his film Is Your Daughter Safe? to The Octopus in order to meet the demands of San Diego (CA) city officials, who found the title objectionable. The film, which was a compilation of footage that was, in some cases, nearly 15 years old, included medical footage of venereal diseases and stock footage depicting white slavery (it is believed that nearly all of Millard's films were compilations of this type.). The film was described by Variety as "possibly the strongest and most dangerous" film of its kind at that point, but it still passed the standards of a group coordinated by the Motion Picture Producers and Distributors of America's Jason Joy, with the group initially stating that the movie taught "a very splendid lesson and that every girl over sixteen years of age ought to be compelled to see it." The MPPDA, surprised at the lack of condemnation, was eventually successful in gaining the condemnations from various women's groups and succeeded in getting the film withdrawn from a number of theaters in the northwestern US, paving the way for further challenges to the genre. Another story, which was passed along by Friedman, involved Millard tricking fellow exploiter Isadore Lazarus into paying Millard $2500 for an unproduced print, then charging nearly an extra $1000 for the finished product.

Millard spent time in San Quentin State Prison, and also had felony incarceration in Detroit, Michigan, in the 1920s, as reported in Variety in 1927 and 1928. The magazine, which was traditionally hostile to the exploitation circuit at the time, used the felony stories as well as the revealing of Millard's real name as evidence against him and his productions. He was allegedly ordered deported in 1932, but remained in the United States.

Millard's son, Nick, is also a director, having produced a number of B-movies during the 1960s, '70s and '80s.

== List of films ==
Millard created and produced an unknown number of films. Most of them have been lost since the time they were distributed, and often the only record of the existence of the films is in the controversy they created. Thus, the list below is incomplete.

- Sex (1920s)
- Is Your Daughter Safe?, also known as The Octopus. (1927)
- Pitfalls of Passion (1927)
- Scarlet Youth (1928)
- Innocent (1932)
- Wild Oats (circa 1940s)

== Works cited ==
- Felicia Feaster and Bret Wood, Forbidden Fruit: The Golden Age of the Exploitation Film (Baltimore, Maryland: Midnight Marquee Press, 1999; ISBN 1-887664-24-6).
- David F. Friedman, A Youth in Babylon: Confessions of a Trash-Film King (Buffalo, N.Y.: Prometheus Books, 1990; ISBN 0-87975-608-X)
- Eric Schaefer, Bold! Daring! Shocking! True!: A History of Exploitation Films, 1919–1959 (Durham, N.C.: Duke University Press, 1999; ISBN 0-8223-2374-5).
