= Repentance (1922 film) =

1922 film

- Directed by: Edward Gordon
- Written by: Edward Gordon
- Produced by: Geoffrey Benstead
- Starring: Peggy Hathaway; Roy Raymond; Geoffrey Benstead
- Production companies: B & Z
- Distributed by: Renters
- Release date: September 1922
- Country: United Kingdom
- Languages: Silent; English intertitles

Repentance is a 1922 British silent drama film directed by Edward Gordon and starring Peggy Hathaway, Roy Raymond and Geoffrey Benstead.

== Cast ==
- Peggy Hathaway as Queenie Creedon
- Roy Raymond as Frank Hepburn
- Hetta Bartlett as Lady Hepburn
- Geoffrey Benstead as Toby
- Ray Lankester as Dr. Smith
- Fabbie Benstead
- Ward McAllister

== Bibliography ==
- Low, Rachael. History of the British Film, 1918-1929. George Allen & Unwin, 1971.
