= Sisters in Arms (1918 film) =

1918 British silent film

- Directed by: Walter West
- Produced by: Walter West
- Starring: Violet Hopson; Hazel Jones; Hilda Bayley
- Production company: Broadwest
- Distributed by: Broadwest
- Release date: November 1918
- Country: United Kingdom
- Languages: Silent; English intertitles

Sisters in Arms is a 1918 British silent short film directed by Walter West and starring Violet Hopson, Hazel Jones and Hilda Bayley. It was made to boost female recruitment into the Armed Forces during the First World War.

== Cast ==
- Violet Hopson as WRAF Girl
- Hazel Jones as WRNS Girl
- Hilda Bayley as WAAC Girl

== Bibliography ==
- Palmer, Scott. British Film Actors' Credits, 1895-1987. McFarland, 1998.
