= A Woman of No Importance (1921 film) =

1921 film by Denison Clift

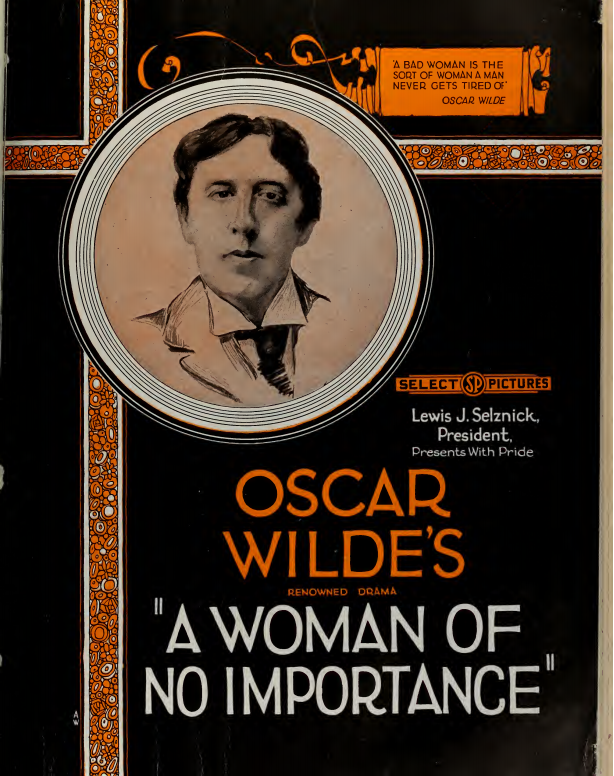
- American advertisement for film with drawing of Oscar Wilde
- Directed by: Denison Clift
- Written by: Oscar Wilde (play); Arthur Q. Walton
- Starring: Fay Compton; Milton Rosmer; Ward McAllister; Lillian Walker; Henry Vibart
- Production company: Ideal Film Company
- Distributed by: Ideal Film Company
- Release date: July 1921
- Country: United Kingdom
- Language: Silent (English intertitles)

A Woman of No Importance is a 1921 British drama film directed by Denison Clift and starring Fay Compton, Milton Rosmer, Ward McAllister, Lillian Walker, and Henry Vibart. It is based on the play A Woman of No Importance by Oscar Wilde. It is not known whether the film currently survives, and it may be a lost film.

== Cast ==
- Fay Compton as Rachel Arbuthnot
- Milton Rosmer as Lord Illingworth
- Ward McAllister as Gerald Arbuthnot
- Lillian Walker as Hester Hasley
- Henry Vibart as Farquhar
- Gwen Carton as Elsie Farquhar
- M. Gray Murray as Sir Thomas Harford
- Hetta Bartlett as Lady Cecilia
- Daisy Campbell as Lady Hunstanton
- Julie Hartley-Milburn as Lady Rofford
- Joey Sanderson as Nurse
