= Sonia (1921 film) =

1921 film

- Directed by: Denison Clift
- Written by: Denison Clift; Stephen McKenna
- Starring: Evelyn Brent; Clive Brook; Cyril Raymond; Olaf Hytten
- Production company: Ideal Film Company
- Distributed by: Ideal Film Company
- Release date: 1921
- Running time: Five reels
- Country: United Kingdom
- Language: Silent

Sonia is a 1921 silent British drama film directed by Denison Clift and starring Evelyn Brent, based on the 1917 novel Sonia: Between Two Worlds by Stephen McKenna. The film is considered to be lost.

== Cast ==
- Evelyn Brent as Sonia Dainton
- Clive Brook as David O'Raine
- Cyril Raymond as Tom Dainton
- Olaf Hytten as Fatty Webster
- Henry Vibart as Reverend Burgess
- M. Gray Murray as Sir Roger Dainton
- Hetta Bartlett as Lady Dainton
- Leo Stormont as Sir Adolph Erckmann
- Gladys Hamilton as Lady Erckmann
- George Travers as Lord Loring
- Julie Hartley-Milburn as Lady Loring
