= Cocaine (1922 film) =

1922 British film by Graham Cutts

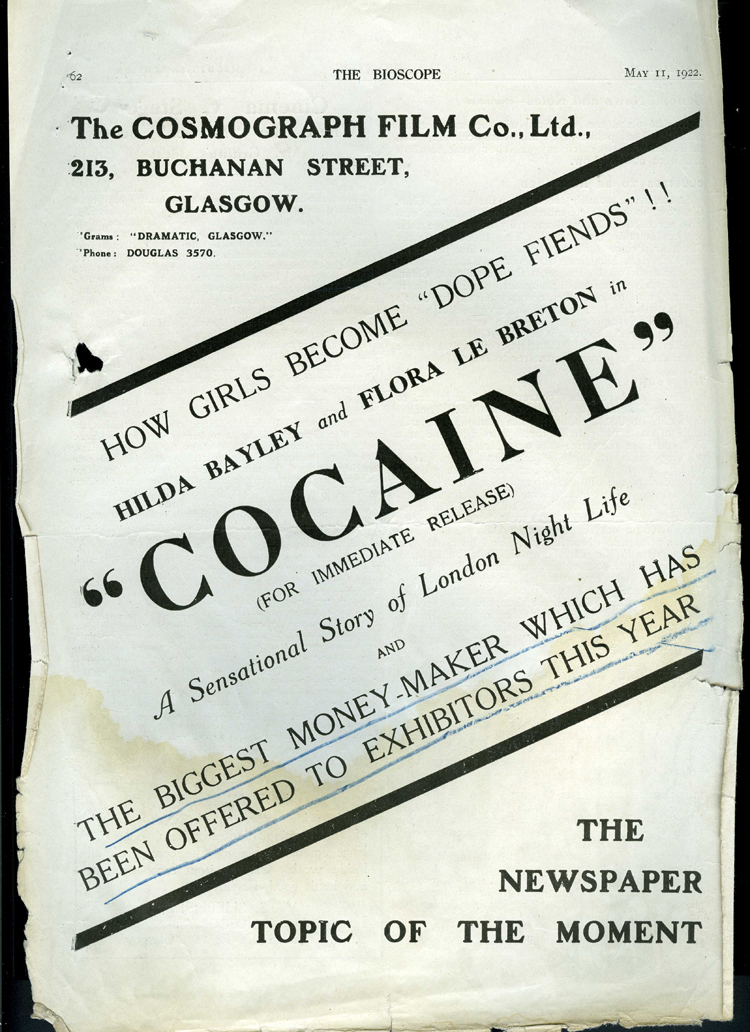
- 1922 trade advertisement
- Directed by: Graham Cutts
- Written by: Frank Miller
- Produced by: Harry B. Parkinson
- Starring: Hilda Bayley; Flora Le Breton; Ward McAllister
- Distributed by: Astra Films
- Release date: June 1922
- Country: United Kingdom
- Language: English

Cocaine is a 1922 British crime film directed by Graham Cutts and starring Hilda Bayley, Flora Le Breton, Ward McAllister and Cyril Raymond. It depicts the distribution of cocaine by gangsters through a series of London nightclubs. In it an innocent young woman called Madge runs away from her strict father, Montagu, who is secretly a drug kingpin. Madge escapes to her old school friend Jenny, who has become a cocaine addict. They head out to a nightclub where Madge is given cocaine by the owner, Min Fu, which Jenny is disturbed about. After desperately hunting his beloved daughter, Montagu finds her under the influence of cocaine, and kills the Min Fu in anger before being shot and killed by the police. Madge is saved by her boyfriend and Jenny, who ultimately finds redemption in the narrative by helping them escape the nightclub shootings before dying of a cocaine overdose in the final scene.

Because of its depiction of drug use, it was the most controversial British film of the 1920s. Cocaine and opium are both seen being taken in various ways. Authorities feared that it might encourage the spread of narcotics. However, as it had a clear message about the dangers of drugs, censors eventually passed it in June 1922 and it was released in cinemas under the alternative title While London Sleeps.

The Chinese gangster Min Fu was reportedly based on real-life criminal Brilliant Chang.

== Cast ==
- Hilda Bayley as Jenny
- Flora Le Breton as Madge Webster
- Ward McAllister as Min Fu
- Cyril Raymond as Stanley
- Tony Fraser as Loki
- Teddy Arundell as Montagu Webster

== Bibliography ==
- Robertson, James Crighton. The Hidden Cinema: British Film Censorship in Action, 1913–1975. Routledge, 1993.
- Sweet, Matthew. Shepperton Babylon: The Lost Worlds of British Cinema. Faber and Faber, 2005.
