= Keira Keogh =

Irish politician

Keira Keogh TD
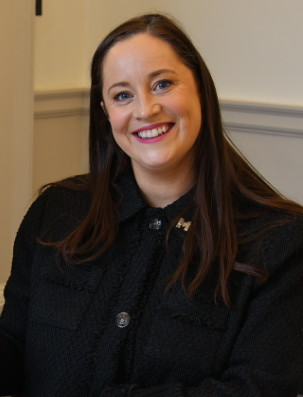
- Keogh in 2024

Teachta Dála
- Incumbent
- Assumed office November 2024
- Constituency: Mayo

Personal details
- Born: 14 November 1985 (age 40)
- Party: Fine Gael

Keira Keogh (born 14 November 1985) is an Irish Fine Gael politician who has been a Teachta Dála (TD) for the Mayo constituency since the 2024 general election.

She has experience in the hospitality industry as her family owns a pub and restaurant.

== Political career ==
Keogh stood for Fine Gael in the 2024 local elections in the Westport electoral area of Mayo County Council but was not elected. On 14 November 2024, she was announced as a general election candidate. At the 2024 general election, Keogh was elected to the Dáil. She was subsequently appointed Cathaoirleach of the Committee on Children and Equality.

Dáil	Election	Deputy (Party)	Deputy (Party)	Deputy (Party)	Deputy (Party)	Deputy (Party)
28th	1997	Beverley Flynn (FF)	Tom Moffatt (FF)	Enda Kenny (FG)	Michael Ring (FG)	Jim Higgins (FG)
29th	2002	Beverley Flynn (FF)	John Carty (FF)	Enda Kenny (FG)	Michael Ring (FG)	Jerry Cowley (Ind.)
30th	2007	Beverley Flynn (Ind.)	Dara Calleary (FF)	Enda Kenny (FG)	Michael Ring (FG)	John O'Mahony (FG)
31st	2011	Michelle Mulherin (FG)	Dara Calleary (FF)	Enda Kenny (FG)	Michael Ring (FG)	John O'Mahony (FG)
32nd	2016	Lisa Chambers (FF)	Dara Calleary (FF)	Enda Kenny (FG)	Michael Ring (FG)	4 seats 2016–2024
33rd	2020	Rose Conway-Walsh (SF)	Dara Calleary (FF)	Alan Dillon (FG)	Michael Ring (FG)	4 seats 2016–2024
34th	2024	Rose Conway-Walsh (SF)	Dara Calleary (FF)	Alan Dillon (FG)	Keira Keogh (FG)	Paul Lawless (Aon)
