= John Carty (Irish politician) =

Irish politician (1950–2014)

Senator
- In office 13 September 2007 – 25 May 2011
- Constituency: Agricultural Panel

Teachta Dála
- In office May 2002 – May 2007
- Constituency: Mayo

Personal details
- Born: 12 August 1950 County Mayo, Ireland
- Died: 30 January 2014 (aged 63) County Mayo, Ireland
- Party: Fianna Fáil
- Spouse: Kathleen Regan
- Children: 8

John Carty (12 August 1950 – 30 January 2014) was an Irish Fianna Fáil politician. He served as a Teachta Dála (TD) from 2002 to 2007 and as a Senator from 2007 to 2011.

From Knock, County Mayo, Carty was elected at the 1999 local elections as a member of Mayo County Council for the Claremorris electoral area. At the 2002 general election, he was elected to Dáil Éireann for the Mayo constituency. He lost his seat at the 2007 general election, but was subsequently elected to the Seanad on the Agricultural Panel. He did not contest the 2011 Seanad election. Carty died on 30 January 2014 at the age of 63. He was married to Kathleen Regan and they had eight children.

Dáil	Election	Deputy (Party)	Deputy (Party)	Deputy (Party)	Deputy (Party)	Deputy (Party)
28th	1997	Beverley Flynn (FF)	Tom Moffatt (FF)	Enda Kenny (FG)	Michael Ring (FG)	Jim Higgins (FG)
29th	2002	Beverley Flynn (FF)	John Carty (FF)	Enda Kenny (FG)	Michael Ring (FG)	Jerry Cowley (Ind.)
30th	2007	Beverley Flynn (Ind.)	Dara Calleary (FF)	Enda Kenny (FG)	Michael Ring (FG)	John O'Mahony (FG)
31st	2011	Michelle Mulherin (FG)	Dara Calleary (FF)	Enda Kenny (FG)	Michael Ring (FG)	John O'Mahony (FG)
32nd	2016	Lisa Chambers (FF)	Dara Calleary (FF)	Enda Kenny (FG)	Michael Ring (FG)	4 seats 2016–2024
33rd	2020	Rose Conway-Walsh (SF)	Dara Calleary (FF)	Alan Dillon (FG)	Michael Ring (FG)	4 seats 2016–2024
34th	2024	Rose Conway-Walsh (SF)	Dara Calleary (FF)	Alan Dillon (FG)	Keira Keogh (FG)	Paul Lawless (Aon)
