= Swedemason =

British musician and video editor

- Born: Chris
- Origin: United Kingdom
- Years active: 2007–present
- Label: Dental Records
- Website: YouTube channel

Swedemason (sometimes styled Swede Mason) is a British musician and video editor who created the track "Masterchef Synesthesia" (also known as "Buttery Biscuit Base") which was released in the United Kingdom in 2011 and reached No. 37 in the UK Singles Chart.

== Career ==
He began producing YouTube videos in 2007; his stage name is a reference to the episode "Rio Reno" of Renegade.

He achieved viral popularity with his single "Masterchef Synesthesia (Buttery Biscuit Base)"; the song itself is based on voice samples of MasterChef hosts Gregg Wallace and John Torode, both of whom have spoken out in favour of the track. The associated YouTube video gained over 10 million views, becoming the sixth most viewed YouTube video in the UK in 2011, and was described by The Guardian as a "masterpiece of editing". Swedemason said that the video took him around a year to complete, although he later clarified that most of that period was just putting the song on the backburner and waiting for a new season of the show to get new material. A semi-final challenge in the 18th series of MasterChef was based on the track, to mark ten years since its release.

Swedemason's other viral videos include one of Donald Trump singing "Once in a Lifetime" by Talking Heads, which has over 6 million views and one of Jeremy Clarkson. His work has been commissioned by Sky News for their political coverage, and Sky Atlantic to promote Game of Thrones. He has worked with JOE to create viral videos cutting up politicians' words to fit songs, winning the 2020 "Content Creator of the Year" award in The Drum's online media awards.

== EP and singles ==
- "Masterchef Synesthesia (Buttery Biscuit Base)" (2011; No label)
