= Is Your Daughter Safe? =

1927 film

Is Your Daughter Safe
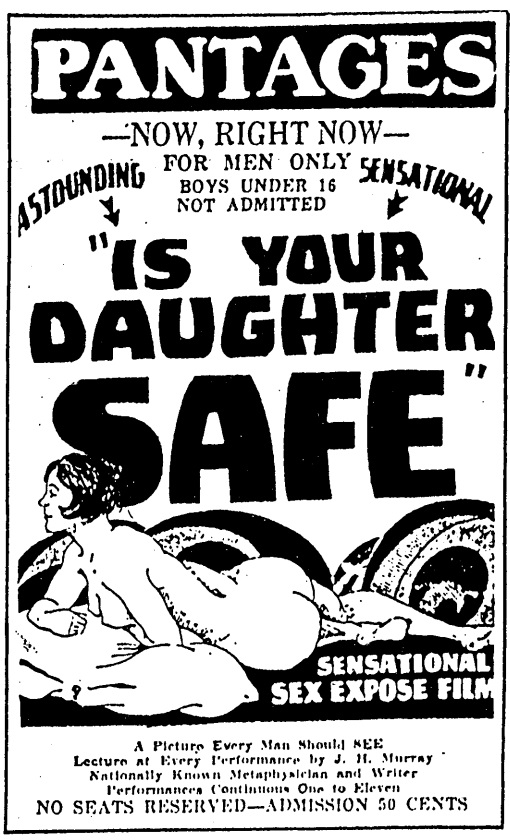
- An undated newspaper advertisement for the movie
- Directed by: S. S. Millard
- Written by: Max Abramson
- Produced by: S. S. Millard
- Starring: Vivian Winston; Jerome Young; Henry Roquemore; Georgia O'Dell; Slim Mahoney; William Dennis; Bernice Breacher
- Distributed by: Chadwick Pictures
- Release date: June 6, 1927
- Running time: 1 hour
- Country: United States
- Language: Silent (English intertitles)
- Budget: $4,000

Is Your Daughter Safe?, also known as The Octopus, is an early American silent exploitation film produced and directed by S. S. Millard. Written by Max Abramson, it was originally released in 1927 and presented around the United States in the following years.

== Cast ==
- Vivian Winston as The Girl
- Jerome Young as The Boy
- Henry Roquemore as The Beast
- Georgia O'Dell as The Madam
- Slim Mahoney as The White Slaver
- William Dennis as The Deceiver
- Bernice Breacher as The Victim
- Palmer Morrison as The Doctor
- Winfield Jones as The Governor
- Joe Bonner as The Rounder
- Hugh Saxon as The Gambler
- Hazel Jones as The Maid
- Vera White as Lady of Leisure
- Hortense Petra as Lady of Leisure
- Virginia Hobbs as Lady of Leisure
- Alta Faulkner as Lady of Leisure
- Dorothy Jay as Lady of Leisure
- June D'Eon as Lady of Leisure
- Mildred Northmore as Lady of Leisure
- Ann Porter as Lady of Leisure
- Geraldine Johnson as Lady of Leisure
- Mildred McClune as Lady of Leisure
- William Hale Thompson as Self (credited as Mayor William Hale Thompson)

== Production background ==
The film was created as a compilation of footage that was, in some cases, nearly fifteen years old, and included stock footage such as medical reels containing footage of venereal diseases and films depicting white slavery. The basic plot was a cautionary tale about a young woman's journey into prostitution and white slavery, but, like the other films of the era, the plot was secondary to the sexual content. Many of the presentations were introduced at the front door, with live nude women in glass booths at the entrances. Inside, the films were usually accompanied by a medical slideshow about venereal disease and a lecture from an alleged sexual education specialist. This was a typical presentation template in the 1920s for a sex hygiene film, and set an example for later exploiters.

In San Diego, Millard was forced to retitle his film Is Your Daughter Safe? to The Octopus in order to meet the demands of city officials who found the title objectionable. The film was described by Variety as "possibly the strongest and most dangerous" film of its kind at that point, but it still passed the standards of a group coordinated by the Motion Picture Producers and Distributors of America's Jason Joy, with the group initially stating that the movie taught "a very splendid lesson and that every girl over sixteen years of age ought to be compelled to see it." The MPPDA, surprised at the lack of a condemnation, was eventually successful in gaining the condemnations from various women's groups and succeeded in withdrawing the film from a number of theaters in the Northwestern United States, paving the way for further challenges to the genre. The success in San Diego led to the film being censored or banned in a number of other communities as time progressed, including persuading a Main Street theater chain in Seattle, Washington, not to run the film and drawing condemnation for Is Your Daughter Safe? and a number of similar films by the Motion Picture Theater Owners of America.

Two women walking along the coast, in a scene from the film

In spite of the controversy and censorship, however, some studies suggested that the film had a positive influence on youth. The Payne Fund interviewed a number of troubled teenagers about the films, and one interview cited Is Your Daughter Safe? as a movie she learned from, saying that it "taught [her] how to beware of boys." Millard also was not above corruption to get clearance, casting Chicago mayor William Hale Thompson in the film to ensure passage by the city's censors.

== See also ==
- List of lost films
- List of sex hygiene films

== Bibliography ==
- Felicia Feaster and Bret Wood, Forbidden Fruit: The Golden Age of the Exploitation Film (Baltimore, Maryland: Midnight Marquee Press, 1999) ISBN 1-887664-24-6
- David F. Friedman, A Youth in Babylon: Confessions of a Trash-Film King (Buffalo, N.Y.: Prometheus Books, 1990) ISBN 0-87975-608-X
- Internet Movie Database: S. S. Millard. URL accessed April 13, 2007
- Larry Langman, American Film Cycles: The Silent Era (Greenwood Press, 1998) ISBN 0-313-30657-5
- Eric Schaefer, Bold! Daring! Shocking! True!: A History of Exploitation Films, 1919-1959 (Durham, N.C.: Duke University Press, 1999) ISBN 0-8223-2374-5
