= General John Regan (1933 film) =

1933 film

- Directed by: Henry Edwards
- Written by: George A. Birmingham (play); Lennox Robinson
- Produced by: Herbert Wilcox
- Starring: Henry Edwards; Chrissie White; Ben Welden
- Cinematography: Cyril Bristow
- Production company: British and Dominions
- Distributed by: Paramount British Pictures
- Release date: 1933
- Running time: 74 minutes
- Country: United Kingdom
- Language: English

General John Regan is a 1933 British comedy film directed by Henry Edwards and starring Edwards, Chrissie White and Ben Welden. It is an adaptation of the 1913 play General John Regan by George A. Birmingham. It was a quota film made at British and Dominion Studios, Elstree, for release by Paramount.

== Cast ==
- Henry Edwards as Dr. O'Grady
- Chrissie White as Moya Kent
- Ben Welden as Billing
- Pegeen Mair as Mary Ellen
- David Horne as Major Kent
- W.G. Fay as Golligher
- Fred O'Donovan as Doyle
- Denis O'Neil as Kerrigan
- Eugene Leahy as Sergeant Colgan
- George Callaghan as Moriarty
- Mary O'Farrell as Mrs. Gregg

== See also ==
- General John Regan (1921)

== Bibliography ==
- Chibnall, Steve. Quota Quickies: The Birth of the British 'B' Film. British Film Institute, 2007.
