= Hilda Bayley =

British actress (1888–1971)

- Born: Hilda Christabel Bailey; 29 June 1888; London, England
- Died: 25 May 1971 (aged 82); London, England
- Occupation: Actress

Hilda Christabel Bailey (29 June 1888 – 25 May 1971) was a British theatre and film actress who became a familiar face playing character roles in British films. She was in both stage and film versions of Carnival in 1918 and 1921, respectively; and in the controversial crime film Cocaine in 1922.

== Early life and career ==
Hilda Christabel Bailey was born on 29 June 1888 in London. Her mother was Louisa (née Cartlidge) and her father was William Heap Bailey, a brewers' manager. She had a brother, Frederick Wilfred, and sister, Cicely Winifred. The family lived on Oakley Square, Camden Town, and she was baptised on 15 August 1888 at St Pancras Parish Church on the Euston Road. Her mother died on 15 April 1908, and Bailey subsequently lived with her father and sister on Woodchurch Road, West Hampstead.

Professionally known as Hilda Bayley, she first appeared on stage in The Yellow Jacket in 1913.

Bayley's first film role was in the 1918 silent film Sisters in Arms. She went on to star in several silent films in the 1920s, such as Carnival in 1921 and the controversial crime film Cocaine in 1922.

After a short break from acting, she had further film roles throughout the late 1930s and 1940s, with her final role being in Madame Louise in 1951.

== Personal life and death ==
Bayley's father died on 1 February 1926. A few months later, on 15 June 1926, she married Frank Norman-Wright at the Marylebone Registry Office, London after meeting on a London bus. Norman-Wright, who was born in Manchester, was also in the film industry, and was the son of businessman J. Wright, who was instrumental in the conversion of the Midland Hotel's Gentleman's Concert Hall into the Midland Cinema. Following her marriage, she retired from acting, and the pair lived at Portman Mansions on the Marylebone Road.

The couple had a daughter, Loretta Katherine Winifred, on 19 July 1927, and later that year Bayley made an application to open an employment agency for theatrical and cinema artists. On 2 March 1928, her daughter died, at the age of seven months. Following the loss of her daughter, Bayley returned to acting, in a production of Thunder in the Air at the Duke of York's Theatre.

Bayley died on 25 May 1971 in London, aged 82. She was cremated at Kensal Green Crematorium on 28 May 1971.

== Partial filmography ==
- Sisters in Arms (1918, short) - WAAC Girl
- The Soul of Guilda Lois (1919)
- Under Suspicion (1919) - Countess Nada
- The Barton Mystery (1920) - Ethel Standish
- Carnival (1921) - Simonetta
- Cocaine (1922) - Madge Webster
- Flames of Passion (1922) - Kate Watson
- The Scandal (1923) - Charlotte
- The Woman Who Obeyed (1923) - Marion Dorchester
- The Secret Adversary (1929) - Rita van den Meer
- Head Office (1936) - Mrs. Braham
- Under a Cloud (1937) - Rosalyn Forbes
- Room for Two (1940) - Dressmaker
- The Farmer's Wife (1941) - Mrs. Rundle
- Jeannie (1941) - Mrs. Jansen
- Much Too Shy (1942) - Lady Driscoll
- Went the Day Well? (1942) - Cousin Maud
- I'll Walk Beside You (1943) - Mrs. Tremayne
- Madonna of the Seven Moons (1945) - Mrs. Fiske
- Give Me the Stars (1945) - Mrs. Ross
- Home Sweet Home (1945) - Mrs. Wright
- I'll Turn to You (1946) - Gossiping Guest
- When You Come Home (1947) - Lady Langfield
- My Brother Jonathan (1948) - Mrs. Perry
- Bond Street (1948) - Madame
- Elizabeth of Ladymead (1948) - Mother in 1946
- School for Randle (1949) - Mrs. Andrews
- Golden Arrow (1949) - Mrs. Felton
- Madame Louise (1951) - Madame Louise (final film role)
