= Joe (website) =

Irish website

- Type: Online newspaper
- Owner: JOE Media Group
- Founder: Niall McGarry
- Publisher: JOE Media Group
- Editor: Ros Madigan
- Founded: 2010
- Headquarters: Dublin
- Circulation: 2 million unique visitors per month
- Website: joe.ie; joe.co.uk

JOE (JOE.ie and JOE.co.uk) is a millennial-focused distributed social media publisher in Ireland and the United Kingdom, with over 2 million unique visitors per month. It is owned by Greencastle Media Group, which is itself owned by David Sefton, John Quinlan and Paul O'Donohoe.

== Background ==
The publisher's original website Joe.ie was founded by Irish entrepreneur Niall McGarry. It was founded in 2010 and nominated in October of that year for a Golden Spider Award in the One to Watch category. Irish showbiz website Goss.ie described it as "more influential" than traditional media in August 2016. SportsJOE.ie was launched in 2014, as an offshoot of JOE.ie, offering "in-depth analysis". Daily Telegraph and Sunday Independent sports columnist Dion Fanning moved to the site in 2015. In November 2016, The Advertising Standards Authority for Ireland upheld a complaint about an advert for Sprite which was featured on the site. Her.ie is a related website aimed at young women in Ireland. HerFamily.ie also forms part of the publishing group. Joe Media Ltd. entered examinership (equivalent to administration in other countries) in May 2020, after a pre-tax loss of losses of €10 million and €1 million in 2019 and 2018 respectively, and following accusations in 2019 that Joe Media had been using click farms to fraudulently exaggerate audience numbers. Joe Media exited examinership in October 2020, after being purchased by the private equity group Greencastle Capital for €10.5 million.

In February 2024, Niamh Geoghegan took on the role of Managing Director of JOE Media Group, having formerly been its Head of Creative Strategy. Ros Madigan, was announced as Head of Content and Social Strategy, leading the strategic content output of all seven brands currently under the Irish arm of JOE Media Group [JOE, Sports JOE, Her, Her Family, Lovin Dublin, Lovin Ireland & Gay Star News].

== JOE.co.uk ==
JOE.co.uk was launched for the United Kingdom market in September 2015 with Tony Barrett of The Times and former footballer Ledley King among the contributors.

BBC political researcher Joey D'Urso cited content from JOE.co.uk, such as a video superimposing Labour leader Jeremy Corbyn's face onto that of the rapper Stormzy while the leader appears "to rap a list of policies", as an example of viral social media content which helped Labour's standing in the 2017 general election (especially among the youth), but which was not directly funded by the party itself.

In 2018, the company hired Brian Whelan from Channel 4 News to oversee video operations and the BBC's Simon Clancy to run their podcast shows.

In 2020, JOE and Swedemason won the 2020 "Content Creator of the Year" award in The Drum's online media awards for their viral videos of mashing up politicians' words to fit a song.

== PoliticsJOE ==
PoliticsJOE is the political stream for the media company. Previously led by Oli Dugmore, who left in October 2025. PoliticsJOE had the most popular political video of 2019, with over 40 million views. During the 2024 United Kingdom general election, the PoliticsJOE podcast had the fifth largest average viewership of UK political podcasts on YouTube.

PoliticsJOE also presents PoliticsJOE Podcast, where Oli Dugmore, Ava Santina and Ed Campbell discuss political and news events sometimes several times a week.

On 3rd July 2026, the parent company of Joe (JMG Media Limited) went into liquidation.
