= Hazel Jones =

British stage actress (1896–1974)

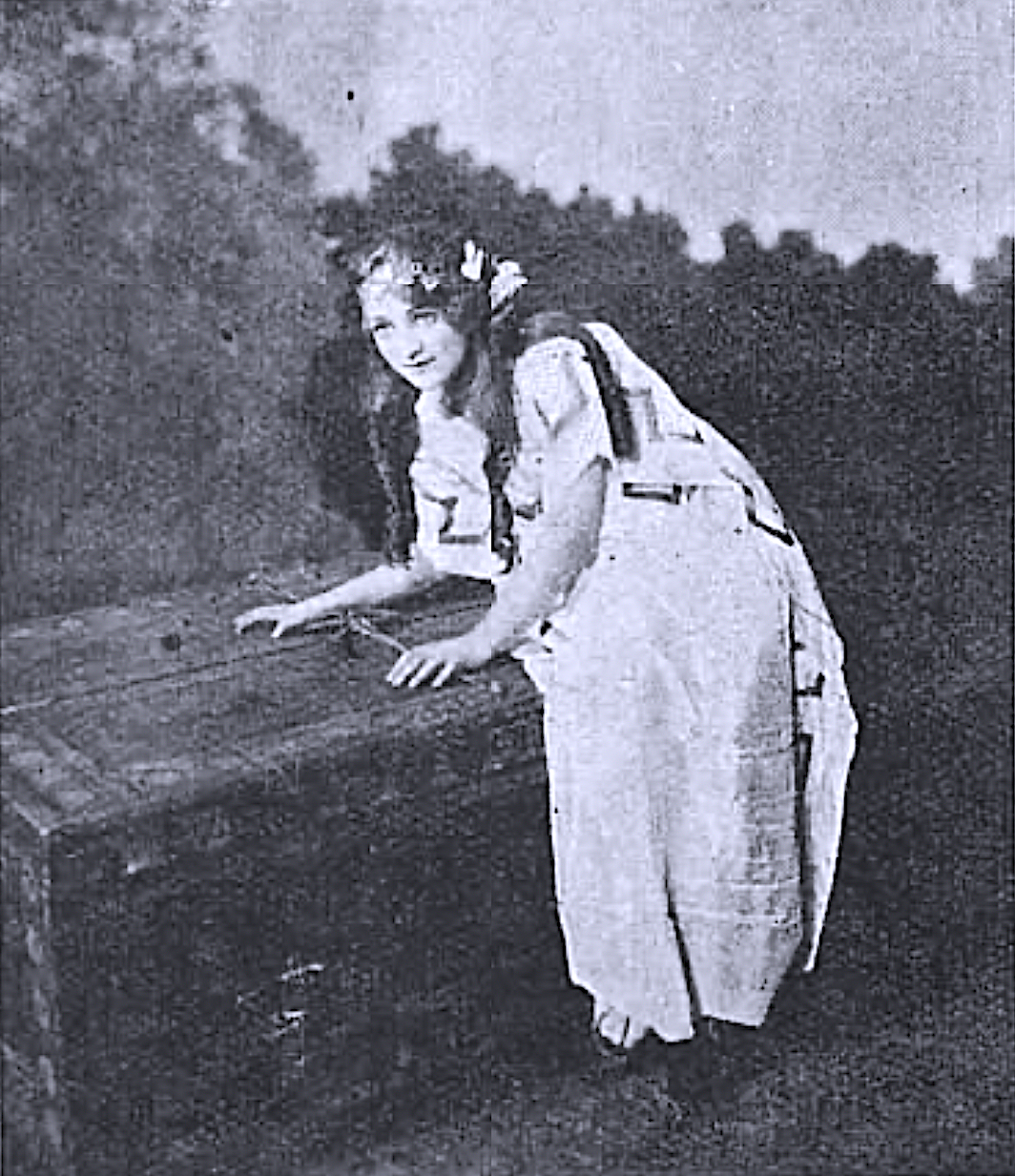
- Hazel Jones in 1918

Hazel Jones (17 October 1896 – 13 November 1974) was an actress from England. She appeared in The Secret of the Moor of 1919, in which a boatman smuggles gold for a miner but gets reformed after his child falls sick. She also played roles in Sisters in Arms (1918) and Is Your Daughter Safe? (1927).

Hazel Jones was born on 17 October 1896 in Swarraton, England, UK. She died on 13 November 1974, aged 79, at St. Vincent's Hospital in New York City, New York, USA.

== Career ==
She made her London stage debut, at the age of 12, as a maid in Louis N. Parker's Pomander Walk. She also acted in the play The Headmaster with Cyril Maude, and with Sir Gerald du Maurier in Raffles. Another early appearance was in The Two Hunchbacks (1910), followed by numerous plays, including L'Aiglon, Nurse Benson, Green Pastures, Piccadilly, Too Many Cooks, Damaged Goods, and other productions.

After about 50 London productions, she made her Broadway debut in 1945 at the Ethel Barrymore Theater with Gertrude Lawrence and Raymond Maisey in George Bernard Shaw's play Pygmalion. Other NY plays include The First Mrs. Frazer, Gayden, The Living Room, The Entertainer, Tea Party, Is Your Daughter Safe? (1927) and Sisters in Arms (1918).
