= John Reagan (disambiguation) =

John Henninger Reagan (1818–1905) was an American politician.

John Reagan may also refer to:

- John Reagan, character in Alias Mary Flynn
- Johnny Reagan (1926–2018), baseball coach
- Jack Reagan (1883–1941), father of Ronald Reagan
- John Neil Reagan (1908–1996), American radio station manager
- John Reagan (New Hampshire politician) (born 1946), New Hampshire politician

== See also ==
- John Regan (disambiguation)
