= The Secret Adversary (film) =

1929 film

- Directed by: Fred Sauer
- Written by: Jane Bess
- Based on: The Secret Adversary by Agatha Christie
- Starring: Carlo Aldini; Hilda Bayley; Eve Gray
- Cinematography: A.O. Weitzenberg
- Production company: Orplid-Film
- Distributed by: Messtro-Film
- Release date: 15 February 1929
- Running time: 76 minutes
- Country: Germany
- Languages: Silent; German intertitles

The Secret Adversary or Adventures Inc. (German: Die Abenteurer G.m.b.H.) is a 1929 German silent mystery film directed by Fred Sauer and starring Carlo Aldini, Hilda Bayley and Eve Gray. It is an adaptation of the British writer Agatha Christie's 1922 novel The Secret Adversary. It was shot at the Grunewald Studios in Berlin and location shooting around the city and the English port of Southampton. The film's sets were designed by the art directors Leopold Blonder and Franz Schroedter.

== Cast ==
- Carlo Aldini as Pierre Lafitte
- Hilda Bayley as Rita van den Meer
- Eve Gray as Lucienne Fereoni
- Eberhard Leithoff as George Finné
- Elfriede Borodin as Jeanette Finné - seine Schwester
- Shayle Gardner as Julius Vardier - Staatssekretär des Innern
- Hans Mierendorff as Marglin - Chef des Geheimdienstes
- John Mylong as Boris
- Valy Arnheim as Wittington
- Mikhail Rasumny

== Bibliography ==
- Brunsdale, Mitzi M. Icons of Mystery and Crime Detection: From Sleuths to Superheroes. ABC-CLIO, 2010.
- Gandert, Gero . Der Film der Weimarer Republik 1929: ein Handbuch der zeitgenössischen Kritik. Walter de Gruyter, 1993.
- Wlaschin, Ken. Silent Mystery and Detective Movies: A Comprehensive Filmography. McFarland, 2009.
