= Hetta Bartlett =

English actress (1877–1947)

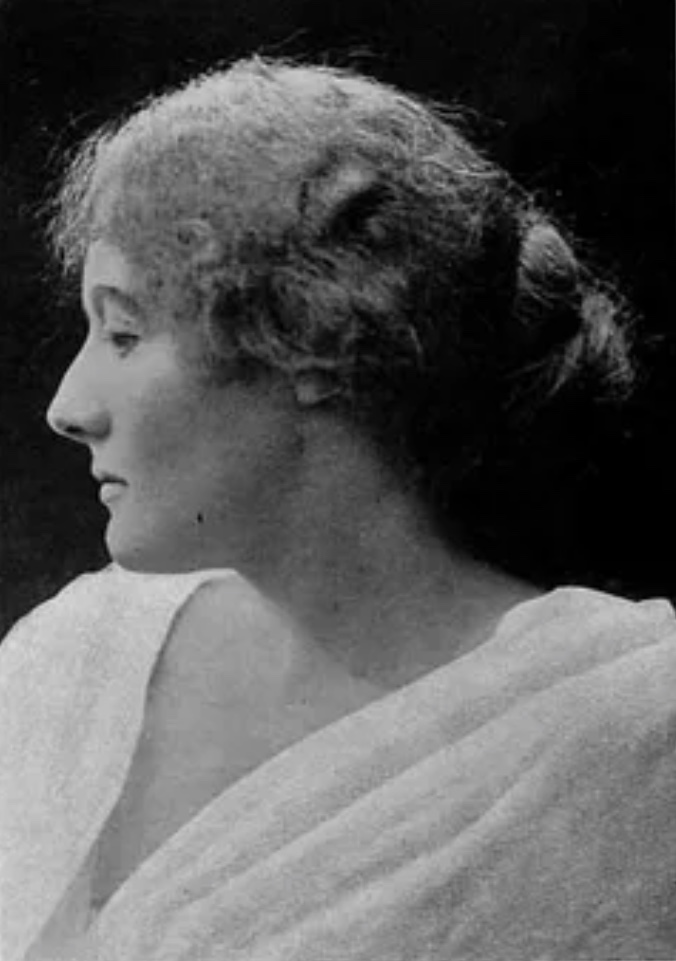
Hetta Bartlett in 1900

Hetta Bartlett (1 May 1877 – May 1947) was an English stage and film actress whose career spanned both the West End and Broadway. She is known for Sonia (1921), The Lady of the Lake (1928) and Honour in Pawn (1916).

== Early life ==
She was born in Tottenham in London as Henrietta Elizabeth Bartlett, the daughter of Sarah Henrietta née Field (1851–1918) and Onesimus Smart Bartlett (1848–1921), a solicitor of Bartlett & Roberts who was Town Clerk and Clerk to the Urban Sanitary Authority in Dartmouth in Devon; by 1891 he was Clerk to the Magistrates' Court in Paignton. In 1903 he would be jailed for embezzlement.

== Acting career ==
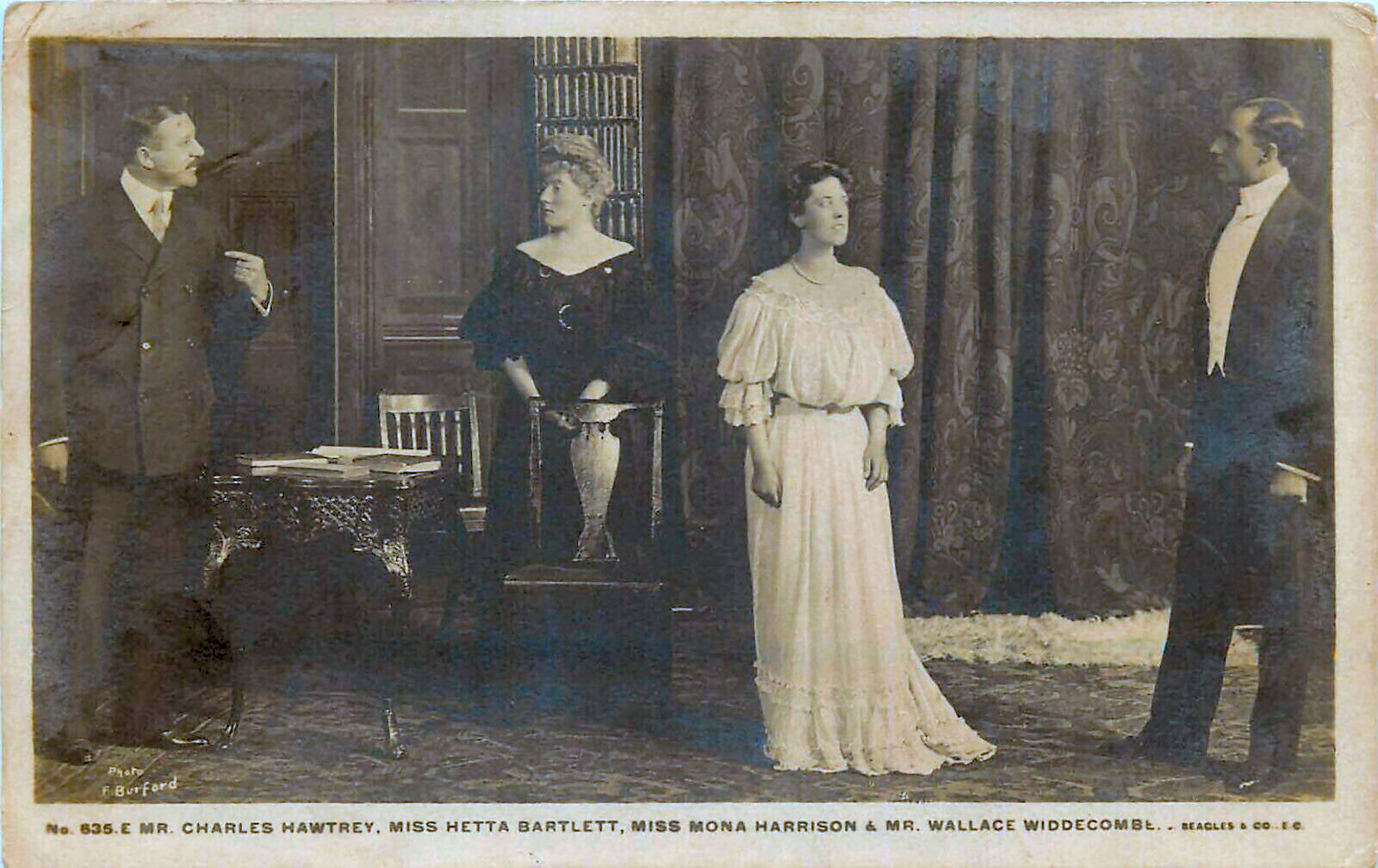
(L to R) Charles Hawtrey, Hetta Bartlett, Mona Harrison and Wallace Widdecombe in A Message from Mars (1905)

By 1899, at the age of 22, Hetta Bartlett was acting in the Company of Charles Hawtrey including his tour of America in the 1900s. In 1900 she played the lead female role in the UK tour of Lord and Lady Algy. Her stage appearances with Charles Hawtrey include: Miss Bramshott in Miss Bramshott's Engagement at the Prince of Wales Theatre (1902); Mrs Ditchwater in The Man from Blankley's at the Prince of Wales Theatre (1903); in the revival of A Message from Mars at the Criterion Theatre on Broadway (1903) and again at the Princes Theatre (1904) and at the Avenue Theatre; (1905). Other roles include: What the Butler Saw at the Garrick Theatre on Broadway in New York (1906); Mrs Patterson in A Pot of Caviare at the Adelphi Theatre (1910); as Miss Ricketts in Jerome K. Jerome's The Master of Mrs Chilvers at the Royalty Theatre (1911); Countess of Skene and Skye in Jelf's at Wyndham's Theatre (1912), and Broomhall in Billy's Fortune at the Criterion Theatre (1913). Bartlett's later stage roles include: Marchioness of Queenstown in In Nelson's Days at the Shaftesbury Theatre (1922).

== Personal life ==
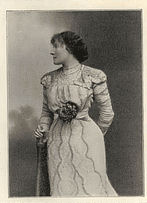
Hetta Bartlett at the time of her marriage in 1899

In 1899, she married the dramatic author Metcalfe Henry Wood (1864–1944) at Totnes in Devon. The marriage was dissolved by 1911 when Bartlett was living alone at 14a Albert Embankment in London. In 1939 she was living in Marylebone in London and described herself as an actress and 'Widowed' on the official register.

Hetta Bartlett died aged 70 in May 1947 in Dartford in Kent.

== Filmography ==
- Uncredited - Honour in Pawn (1916)
- Lady Cecelia - A Woman of No Importance (1921)
- Lady Dainton - Sonia (1921)
- Mrs Cathcart - Melody of Death (1922)
- Lady Hepburn - Repentance (1922)
- Court Lady - The Glorious Adventure (1922)
- Margaret - The Lady of the Lake (1928)
