= Stephen McKenna (novelist) =

English novelist (1888–1967)

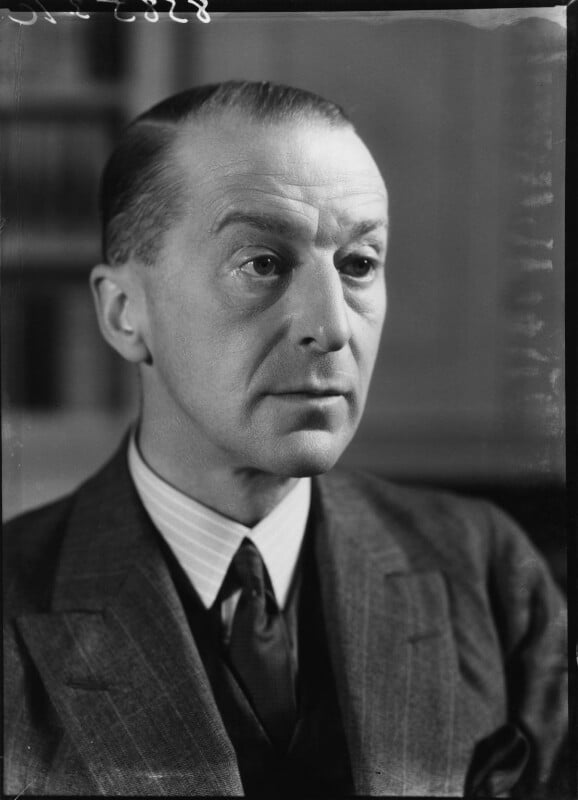
- McKenna in 1939
- Born: 27 February 1888; Beckenham, England
- Died: 26 September 1967 (aged 79)
- Occupation: Novelist

Stephen McKenna (27 February 1888 – 26 September 1967) was an English novelist who wrote forty-seven novels, mostly focusing on English upper-class society, and six non-fiction titles. He published his first novel, The Reluctant Lover, in 1912. His best-known novel, Sonia: Between Two Worlds, was published in 1917. It was the tenth best-selling novel for 1918 in the United States, and also made into a British film of the same name in 1921.

McKenna was the son of Leopold and Ellen McKenna. He was educated at Westminster School (Scholar), London, and at Christ Church, Oxford (Exhibitioner). He gained a second-class honours degree in history at Oxford in 1909. After graduation, he taught briefly at Westminster School but found teaching uncongenial. Independent means allowed him to travel in Europe, Asia, Africa, and America. He was medically unfit for active service during the First World War but worked in the War Trade Intelligence Department, 1915–19, and served in Arthur Balfour's Mission to the United States of America, 1917.

The partly autobiographical While I Remember (1921) conveys a flavour of McKenna's early years, including his time at Oxford.

The satirical moral inversion in McKenna's Confessions of a Well-Meaning Woman was acknowledged by C.S. Lewis as an influence on the latter's Screwtape letters: "the blacks all white and the whites all black".

McKenna's The Oldest God (1926) is a philosophical fantasy novel featuring the god Pan.

He wrote Tex. A chapter in the life of Alexander Teixeira de Mattos, a biography about Alexander Teixeira de Mattos, the Dutch journalist who translated books from many languages into English, a.o. Louis Couperus, whom McKenna befriended in 1921.

His uncle was Reginald McKenna, Chancellor of the Exchequer under H. H. Asquith, of whom he published a biography in 1948, Reginald McKenna, 1863-1943: A Memoir.

His clubs were the Reform and the Garrick. For a considerable portion of his adult life he lived at 11 Stone Buildings, Lincoln's Inn, London.

== Works ==
- The Reluctant Lover, (1913)
- Shelia Intervenes, (1914)
- The Sixth Sense, (1915)
- Ninety-Six Hours' Leave, (1917)
- Sonia, Between Two Worlds, (1917)
- Midas And Son, (1919)
- Sonia Married, (1919)
- Lady Lilith, The Sensationalists part 1, (1920)
- While I Remember, (1921)
- The Education Of Eric Lane, The Sensationalists part 2, (1921)
- The Secret Victory, The Sensationalists part 3, (1921)
- Tex: A Chapter In The Life Of Alexander Teixeira De Mattos, (1922)
- The Confessions Of A Well-Meaning Woman, (1922)
- By Intervention Of Providence, (1923)
- Vindcation, (1923)
- Soliloquy, (1923)
- The Commandment Of Moses, (1923)
- To-morrow And To-morrow, (1924)
- Tales Of Intrigue And Revenge, (1924)
- An Affair Of Honour, (1925)
- The Oldest God, (1926)
- Saviours Of Society, (1926)
- Due Reckoning, (1927)
- The Secretary Of State, (1927)
- The Shadow Of Guy Denver, (1928)
- Divided Allegiance, (1928)
- The Unburied Dead, (1928)
- The Datchley Inheritance, (1929)
- Between The Lines, (1929)
- Happy Ending, (1929)
- The Redemption Of Morley Darville, (1930)
- The Cast-Iron Duke, (1930)
- Dermotts Rampant, (1931)
- Beyond Hell, (1931)
- The Way Of The Phoenix, (1932)
- Superstition, (1932)
- Pandora's Box And Other Stories, (1932)
- Namesakes, (1933)
- Magic Quest, (1933)
- Portrait Of His Excellency, (1934)
- The Undiscovered Country, (1934)
- Sole Death, (1935)
- Lady Cynthia Clandon's Husband, (1936)
- While Of Sound Mind, (1936)
- The Home That Jill Broke, (1937)
- Last Confession, (1937)
- Breasted Amazon, (1938)
- Paganism And Pagan Survivals In Spain...Visigothic Kingdom, (1938)
- A Life For A Life, (1939)
- Mean, Sensual Man, (1943)
- Not Necessarily For Publication, (c1943)
- A Brief History Of The Church, (1946)
- Modern Missions In South America, (1947)
- Reginald McKenna, 1863-1943, (1948)
- Not Necessarily For Publication, (1949)
- Pearl Wedding, (1951)
- Life's Eventime, (1954)
- Saint Hilary Of Poitiers: The Trinity, (1954)
- That Dumb Loving, (1957)
- A Place In The Sun, (1962)
