= Jack Regan (disambiguation) =

Jack Regan (1912–1988) was an Australian rules footballer.

Jack Regan may also refer to:

- Jack Regan (hurler) (born 1995), Irish hurler
- Jack Regan (American football) (?–2015), American football coach
- Jack Regan (rugby union) (born 1997), Irish rugby union player
- Jack Regan (The Sweeney)

== See also ==
- Jack Reagan (1883–1941), father of Ronald Reagan
- John Regan (disambiguation)
