= The Lady of the Lake (film) =

1928 film

- Directed by: James A. FitzPatrick
- Written by: Sir Walter Scott (play); Angus MacPhail; James A. FitzPatrick
- Produced by: Michael Balcon
- Starring: Percy Marmont; Benita Hume; Lawson Butt; James Carew
- Cinematography: Bert Dawley; Leslie Rowson; James Wilson
- Music by: Nathaniel Shilkret
- Production company: Gainsborough Pictures
- Distributed by: FitzPatrick Pictures (US)
- Release date: December 1928
- Country: United Kingdom
- Languages: Sound (Synchronized); English

The Lady of the Lake is a 1928 British sound romance film directed by James A. FitzPatrick and starring Percy Marmont, Benita Hume and Lawson Butt. While the film has no audible dialog, it features a synchronized musical score with singing and sound effects. The film is based on the 1810 poem The Lady of the Lake by Walter Scott.

== Cast ==
- Percy Marmont as James FitzJames
- Benita Hume as The Lady of the Lake
- Lawson Butt as Roderick Dhu
- James Carew as Lord Moray
- Haddon Mason as Malcolm Graeme
- Hetta Bartlett as Margaret
- Leo Dryden as Allan Bayne
- Sara Francis as Blanche of Devon
- James Douglas as Douglas

== Music ==
The film features a theme song entitled "Eileen, Sweet Eileen" which was composed by Nathaniel Shilkret.

== Production ==
The film was made at the Islington Studios of Gainsborough Pictures. The film was originally silent, with sound added in July 1931.

== Bibliography ==
- Cook, Pam. Gainsborough Pictures. Cassell, 1997.
