= John Jordan (judge) =

Irish barrister, High Court judge since 2019

The Hon. Mr. Justice John Jordan
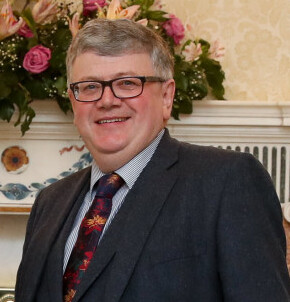
- Jordan in 2019

Judge of the High Court
- Incumbent
- Assumed office 4 February 2019
- Nominated by: Government of Ireland
- Appointed by: Michael D. Higgins

Personal details
- Born: Castlebar, County Mayo, Ireland
- Education: University College Dublin; King's Inns

John Jordan is an Irish judge who has served as a Judge of the High Court since February 2019. He previously practiced as a barrister.

== Early life ==
Jordan is from Castlebar, County Mayo, where he attended secondary school at St Gerald's College. He studied law at University College Dublin and at the King's Inns.

== Legal career ==
He was called to the Bar in 1985 and became a senior counsel in 2011. Prior to his appointment as a senior counsel, Jordan served as the State Prosecutor in the Circuit Court in County Mayo. His practice encompassed criminal law and private law, including in the areas of contract law, tort law, and property law. In criminal trials, he acted for both the defence and on behalf of the Director of Public Prosecutions in matters involving sexual offences, road traffic offences, fraud, and homicide.

He acted for the DPP in the prosecution of Pádraig Nally and subsequent appeal arising out of the death of John Ward.

== Judicial career ==
Jordan became a judge of the High Court in February 2019. He has presided over cases involving injunctions, company law, and family and child law.

From November 2019 until October 2025, Jordan served as Judge in Charge of the High Court Family List. He has also been and remains the Judge in Charge of the Minors in Special Care List, and is also currently assigned to sit in the Chancery List.

Jordan also serves as the International Hague Network Judge for Ireland.
