= Jerry Cowley =

Irish barrister, medical doctor and former politician (born 1952)

- Cowley speaking at a Shell to Sea protest in Bellanaboy, 2006

Teachta Dála
- In office May 2002 – May 2007
- Constituency: Mayo

Personal details
- Born: 11 November 1952 (age 73) Ballina, County Mayo, Ireland
- Party: Independent
- Other political affiliations: Labour Party (2010–2014)
- Children: 5
- Website: jerrycowley.blogspot.com

Jerry Cowley (born 11 November 1952) is an Irish barrister, medical doctor and former politician. Originally from Ballina, he lives in Mulranny. He was an Independent Teachta Dála (TD) for the Mayo constituency after being elected to Dáil Éireann at the 2002 general election. He served until losing his seat at the 2007 general election. In April 2010, he joined the Labour Party. He was an unsuccessful candidate for the party in the Mayo constituency at the 2011 general election.

Cowley was an independent candidate for the Mayo constituency at the 2016 general election, but failed to get elected. He is a former Mayo Person of the Year, and won a Rehab People of the Year Award in 1998.

Dáil	Election	Deputy (Party)	Deputy (Party)	Deputy (Party)	Deputy (Party)	Deputy (Party)
28th	1997	Beverley Flynn (FF)	Tom Moffatt (FF)	Enda Kenny (FG)	Michael Ring (FG)	Jim Higgins (FG)
29th	2002	Beverley Flynn (FF)	John Carty (FF)	Enda Kenny (FG)	Michael Ring (FG)	Jerry Cowley (Ind.)
30th	2007	Beverley Flynn (Ind.)	Dara Calleary (FF)	Enda Kenny (FG)	Michael Ring (FG)	John O'Mahony (FG)
31st	2011	Michelle Mulherin (FG)	Dara Calleary (FF)	Enda Kenny (FG)	Michael Ring (FG)	John O'Mahony (FG)
32nd	2016	Lisa Chambers (FF)	Dara Calleary (FF)	Enda Kenny (FG)	Michael Ring (FG)	4 seats 2016–2024
33rd	2020	Rose Conway-Walsh (SF)	Dara Calleary (FF)	Alan Dillon (FG)	Michael Ring (FG)	4 seats 2016–2024
34th	2024	Rose Conway-Walsh (SF)	Dara Calleary (FF)	Alan Dillon (FG)	Keira Keogh (FG)	Paul Lawless (Aon)
