= Thomas Joseph Commons =

Irish police officer

Thomas Joseph Commons (born 4 January 1950), is a senior Irish police officer (Garda 18035A) and Scott Medal recipient.

Commons was a native of County Mayo, who was a junior clerk prior to joining the Garda Síochána on 17 November 1971.

He was on motorcycle patrol in Dublin on the evening of 22 July 1978 when he stopped and questioned two men suspected of an armed robbery and vicious assault. One attempted to fire at Garda Commons at point-blank range, but the gun misfired. A lengthy pursuit ensued, which ended with Garda Commons wrestling the gunman to the ground and subduing him. Other members of the force arrived on the scene, and the other suspect was arrested. Examination of the gun revealed it to be in perfect working order; Commons's life was saved only by the fact that the wrong gauge of bullet was loaded.

Garda Commons was awarded the Scott Bronze Medal at Templemore in June 1980. He became a Sergeant the same year, an Inspector in 1994, and promoted to Superintendent in 1998. As of 2008 he is still a member of the force.
