= John O'Mahony (Mayo politician) =

Irish Gaelic football manager and politician (1953–2024)

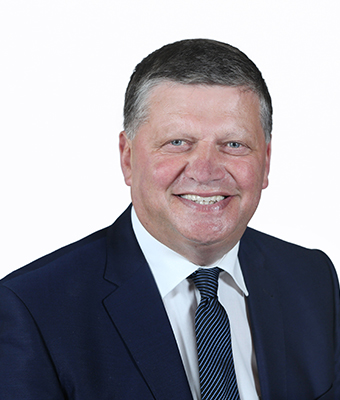
- O'Mahony in 2016

Senator
- In office 8 June 2016 – 29 June 2020
- Constituency: Nominated by the Taoiseach

Teachta Dála
- In office May 2007 – February 2016
- Constituency: Mayo

Personal details
- Born: 8 June 1953 Kilmovee, County Mayo, Ireland
- Died: 6 July 2024 (aged 71) Galway, Ireland
- Party: Fine Gael
- Spouse: Gerardine Towey (m. 1978)
- Children: 5
- Education: St Patrick's College, Maynooth; University College Galway

John Christopher O'Mahony (8 June 1953 – 6 July 2024) was an Irish Gaelic football manager and Fine Gael politician who served as a Senator from 2016 to 2020, after being nominated by the Taoiseach. He was a Teachta Dála (TD) for the Mayo constituency from 2007 to 2016.

== Early and personal life ==
O'Mahony was a native of Kilmovee, County Mayo. He was a graduate of University College Galway. He taught for many years at St Nathy's College, Ballaghaderreen, County Roscommon.

O'Mahony was married to Gerardine Towey; together, they had five daughters.

O'Mahony died in Galway on 6 July 2024, after being diagnosed with cancer in later years. He was 71 years old.

== Sports career ==
O'Mahony managed several county teams in Gaelic football. First he managed his native Mayo from 1987 until 1991. He then guided Leitrim to the 1994 Connacht Senior Football Championship title, while managing the team between 1992 and 1996. He then led Galway to two All-Ireland Senior Football Championship titles in 1998 and 2001, while managing the team between 1997 and 2004. In 2009, he was named at 114 in the Sunday Tribune's list of the 125 Most Influential People In GAA History.

== Political career ==
O'Mahony was elected as a TD for the Mayo constituency at the 2007 general election. He lost his seat at the 2016 general election. In the 2016 general election, he stood in the Galway West constituency, due to the Mayo constituency being reduced from five to four seats, and Fine Gael having four outgoing TDs in the Mayo constituency.

In May 2016, he was nominated by the Taoiseach Enda Kenny to the 25th Seanad.

He was the Fine Gael Seanad spokesperson on Transport, Tourism and Sport.

Gaelic games
Preceded by Páidí Ó Sé	All-Ireland SFC-winning manager 1998	Succeeded by Seán Boylan
Preceded by Páidí Ó Sé	All-Ireland SFC-winning manager 2001	Succeeded by Joe Kernan

Dáil	Election	Deputy (Party)	Deputy (Party)	Deputy (Party)	Deputy (Party)	Deputy (Party)
28th	1997	Beverley Flynn (FF)	Tom Moffatt (FF)	Enda Kenny (FG)	Michael Ring (FG)	Jim Higgins (FG)
29th	2002	Beverley Flynn (FF)	John Carty (FF)	Enda Kenny (FG)	Michael Ring (FG)	Jerry Cowley (Ind.)
30th	2007	Beverley Flynn (Ind.)	Dara Calleary (FF)	Enda Kenny (FG)	Michael Ring (FG)	John O'Mahony (FG)
31st	2011	Michelle Mulherin (FG)	Dara Calleary (FF)	Enda Kenny (FG)	Michael Ring (FG)	John O'Mahony (FG)
32nd	2016	Lisa Chambers (FF)	Dara Calleary (FF)	Enda Kenny (FG)	Michael Ring (FG)	4 seats 2016–2024
33rd	2020	Rose Conway-Walsh (SF)	Dara Calleary (FF)	Alan Dillon (FG)	Michael Ring (FG)	4 seats 2016–2024
34th	2024	Rose Conway-Walsh (SF)	Dara Calleary (FF)	Alan Dillon (FG)	Keira Keogh (FG)	Paul Lawless (Aon)
