= Mael Brigte mac Mothlachain =

Irish assassin

Mael Brigte mac Mothlachain, assassin, fl. 649.

Mael Brigte was a member of the Corco Chulla, described by Nollaig O Muraile as "a particularly obscure population-group," Mael Brigte assassinated King Rogallach mac Uatach of Connacht in 649, who had been expanding the borders of his kingdom west towards the Corco Chulla, thought to have been located within the kingdom of the Ciarraige.

Rogallach was buried at the church of Baslick, founded by Saint Patrick, and which remained within the territory of the Ciarraige until the end of the 8th century.

Mael Brigte's appellation, mac Mothlachain, is a patronymic, not a surname.

Of the Corco Chulla themselves, O Muraile stated "It has been suggested that they may have been a sept, or an aithech-tuath, of the Ciarraige. But, other than their dubious moment of notoriety, absolutely nothing is known of them."

== See also ==
- Deisi
- Connachta
- Ui Briuin
