= Micheál de Búrca =

Irish artist (1912–1985)

Micheál de Búrca RHA (31 December 1912 – 9 December 1985), born Michael Bourke, was an Irish artist from Castlebar who was appointed Director of the National College of Art and Design in 1942. He primarily painted landscapes and seascapes using oil paints on board and watercolours on board respectively. His work "Summer Evening, Achill" has been used in several books and collections to date.

== Early life ==
Micheál de Búrca was born in 1913 in Tipperary. He was reared in Maryland House, Castlebar, the Bourke family residence at the time, by Thomas Bourke, a businessman, and his wife, Madge. The Bourkes' business started in 1881 and included harnesses, saddlery, bicycles, motorcars, a cinema and a power generation station which provided Castlebar with electricity.

== Education ==
Michael began his education at St. Gerald's College in Castlebar, then studied at the Dublin Metropolitan School of Art (forerunner to the National College of Art and Design).

== Career ==
After finishing his studies Michael was appointed as an Art Inspector within the Department of Education. It was at this time that he visited schools and drew up the national art syllabus for secondary schools.

In 1941 following the unexpected sudden death of George Atkinson, then Director of the National College of Art, Michael was appointed to the position of Acting Director. Shortly thereafter in 1942 Michael was appointed Director. It was because of this position that he changed his name to the Irish form (Micheál de Búrca) because the Director was required to be a Gaeilgeoir (an Irish language enthusiast). He was already fluent in Irish. He used the signature Michael Bourke initially, before switching to Micheál de Búrca. He continued to paint and exhibit as the Director. During World War II he re-introduced stained glass, screen printing, weaving and metal work to the college's curriculum. To facilitate this expansion he encouraged Patrick McElroy, a blacksmith and RAF veteran with CIÉ to lecture on enamelling and fine art metalwork.

Around the same time he organised a travelling art exhibition to take art by rail to technical schools around the country. The aim of which was "to awaken interest in art and encourage art teaching". About 60 works were involved in this exhibition, all donated by artists and owners for the length of the exhibition.

The exhibition tour also included works by: Sir John Lavery, Walter Osborne, Nathaniel Hone, Patrick Tuohy, Maurice MacGonigal, Seán O'Sullivan, Jack Butler Yeats, John Keating, Laetitia Hamilton, James Humbert Craig, Harry Kernoff, and Charles Lamb.

== Later life ==
Michael retired in 1971 and moved back to Westport, where he died in 1985.

== Themes and style ==
Michael's medium was painting, mostly with oil on canvas or oil on board but he commonly used watercolours on board for paintings that featured any expanse of water. The initial image was usually sketched in pencil and later filled with colour. Michael drew most of his inspiration from nature and the West of Ireland. This is reflected by his works, the majority of which were created in the West, often at Achill Island in Mayo, Connemara in Galway, and the surrounding areas. He had a particular liking for painting mountains and expanses of water, often in the same painting. He also painted a significant number of harbour and quay scenes, depicting fishermen at work, currachs, trawlers, Galway hookers and various piers.

== Exhibitions ==
Micheal used to attend and exhibit his paintings at numerous exhibitions around the country, notably the annual RHA Exhibition and the NCAD Exhibition. There have also been two posthumous exhibitions, one in 1988 in the Marketing Centre in Cork City, and one in 2009 in the Customs House in Westport, coinciding with the Westport Arts Festival of 2009.
