= Mayo (Dáil constituency) =

Dáil constituency (1997–present)

- Dáil constituency
- Location of Mayo within Ireland
- Interactive map of constituency boundaries since the 2024 general election
- Major settlements: Ballina; Ballinrobe; Castlebar; Claremorris; Westport

Current constituency
- Created: 1997
- Seats: 5 (1997–2016); 4 (2016–2024); 5 (2024–)
- TDs: Dara Calleary (FF); Rose Conway-Walsh (SF); Alan Dillon (FG); Keira Keogh (FG); Paul Lawless (Aon)
- Local government area: County Mayo
- Created from: Mayo East; Mayo West
- EP constituency: Midlands–North-West

Mayo is a parliamentary constituency represented in Dáil Éireann, the lower house of the Oireachtas (the Irish parliament). The constituency elects five deputies (Teachtaí Dála, commonly known as TDs) on the system of proportional representation by means of the single transferable vote (PR-STV). It includes the entirety of County Mayo.

== History ==
At the 2002 general election Fine Gael suffered its worst electoral performance ever, losing 23 seats nationally, a figure larger than expected and with its overall vote down 5%. Enda Kenny came close to losing his seat and even went so far as to prepare a concession speech. In the end, he won the third seat in the five-seat constituency.

At the 2011 general election, this was the constituency of Fine Gael leader Enda Kenny, who became Taoiseach after the election. Fine Gael won four out of five seats in Mayo at that election. This was the first time any party won four seats in any five-seat Dáíl constituency; the last time any party had won four seats in a Dáil constituency was in the era of six- and seven-seat constituencies.

== Boundaries ==
Mayo is the largest Dáil constituency in Ireland by area. Its largest towns are Castlebar, Ballina, Westport, Claremorris and Ballinrobe. It is defined by the Electoral (Amendment) Act 2023 as:

"The county of Mayo."

The constituency was used for the first time at the 1997 general election and replaced the former constituencies of Mayo East and Mayo West.

Changes to the Mayo constituency
Years	TDs	Boundaries	Notes
1997–2016	5	The county of Mayo.	Created from Mayo East and Mayo West.
2016–2020	4	The county of Mayo, except the part in the constituency of Galway West.	Electoral divisions of Ballinrobe, Cong, Dalgan, Houndswood, Kilcommon, Kilmaine, Neale, Shrule, in the former Rural District of Ballinrobe, and Garrymore in the former Rural District of Claremorris, transferred to Galway West.
2020–2024	4	The county of Mayo, except the part in the constituency of Galway West.	Electoral divisions of Ballinrobe, Kilcommon and Garrymore transferred from Galway West
2024–	5	County Mayo	Transfer of remaining area from Galway West

== TDs ==
Teachtaí Dála (TDs) for Mayo 1997–
Key to parties: Aon = Aontú; FF = Fianna Fáil; FG = Fine Gael; SF = Sinn Féin; Ind. = Independent
Dáil	Election	Deputy (Party)	Deputy (Party)	Deputy (Party)	Deputy (Party)	Deputy (Party)
28th	1997	Beverley Flynn (FF)	Tom Moffatt (FF)	Enda Kenny (FG)	Michael Ring (FG)	Jim Higgins (FG)
29th	2002	Beverley Flynn (FF)	John Carty (FF)	Enda Kenny (FG)	Michael Ring (FG)	Jerry Cowley (Ind.)
30th	2007	Beverley Flynn (Ind.)	Dara Calleary (FF)	Enda Kenny (FG)	Michael Ring (FG)	John O'Mahony (FG)
31st	2011	Michelle Mulherin (FG)	Dara Calleary (FF)	Enda Kenny (FG)	Michael Ring (FG)	John O'Mahony (FG)
32nd	2016	Lisa Chambers (FF)	Dara Calleary (FF)	Enda Kenny (FG)	Michael Ring (FG)	4 seats 2016–2024
33rd	2020	Rose Conway-Walsh (SF)	Dara Calleary (FF)	Alan Dillon (FG)	Michael Ring (FG)	4 seats 2016–2024
34th	2024	Rose Conway-Walsh (SF)	Dara Calleary (FF)	Alan Dillon (FG)	Keira Keogh (FG)	Paul Lawless (Aon)

Note: The columns in this table are used only for presentational purposes, and no significance should be attached to the order of columns. For details of the order in which seats were won at each election, see the detailed results of that election.

== Elections ==
*: Outgoing TD

=== 2024 general election ===
2024 general election: Mayo
Party	Candidate	FPv%	Count										
Party	Candidate	FPv%	1	2	3	4	5	6	7	8	9	10	11
Sinn Féin	Rose Conway-Walsh	14.3	10,117	10,176	10,888	11,296	11,417	11,963					
Fine Gael	Alan Dillon	13.4	9,517	9,558	9,722	9,908	11,008	11,205	11,623	13,174			
Fianna Fáil	Dara Calleary	12.2	8,620	8,661	8,784	8,899	9,079	9,192	9,699	13,097			
Fine Gael	Mark Duffy	8.5	6,009	6,044	6,159	6,207	6,458	6,584	6,906	7,109	7,446	7,735	
Fine Gael	Keira Keogh	8.2	5,830	5,842	6,025	6,679	7,391	7,502	7,614	8,150	8,590	9,003	12,475
Fianna Fáil	Lisa Chambers	7.9	5,584	5,605	5,774	6,011	6,316	6,412	6,709				
Independent	Patsy O'Brien	7.4	5,229	5,268	5,325	5,556	6,131	6,654	7,094	7,506	7,653	7,963	8,258
Aontú	Paul Lawless	6.3	4,482	4,524	4,620	4,917	5,156	6,576	7,612	7,910	8,104	8,377	9,506
Sinn Féin	Gerry Murray	5.1	3,600	3,616	3,798	3,887	3,942	4,091					
Fine Gael	Martina Jennings	4.9	3,488	3,499	3,571	3,632							
Independent	Stephen Kerr	4.6	3,289	3,361	3,454	3,659	3,684						
Independent Ireland	Chris Maxwell	3.5	2,488	2,555	2,616								
PBP–Solidarity	Joe Daly (Note: Daly is a member of People Before Profit.)	1.7	1,199	1,206									
Green	Mícheál Ó Conaill	1.3	925	929									
Independent	Gerry Loftus	0.6	423										
Independent	Seán Forkin	0.1	66										
Electorate: 112,205 Valid: 70,866 Spoilt: 451 Quota: 11,812 Turnout: 63.6%

=== 2020 general election ===
2020 general election: Mayo
Party	Candidate	FPv%	Count						
Party	Candidate	FPv%	1	2	3	4	5	6	7
Fine Gael	Michael Ring	23.0	14,796						
Sinn Féin	Rose Conway-Walsh	22.7	14,633						
Fianna Fáil	Dara Calleary	14.2	9,163	9,377	9,671	9,874	10,429	11,130	13,636
Fianna Fáil	Lisa Chambers	9.9	6,373	6,647	6,855	7,062	7,375	8,363	8,911
Fine Gael	Michelle Mulherin	8.4	5,435	5,929	6,045	6,285	6,596	7,427	
Fine Gael	Alan Dillon	8.1	5,198	5,823	5,944	6,115	6,553	7,648	10,977
Green	Saoirse McHugh	6.5	4,177	4,321	4,630	5,385	6,036		
Aontú	Paul Lawless	4.0	2,574	2,662	2,854	3,375			
Solidarity–PBP	Joe Daly (Note: Daly was a member of People Before Profit.)	1.1	721	751	1,072				
Independent	Gerry Loftus	0.9	574	595	670				
Labour	Kamal Uddin	0.4	255	272	308				
Irish Freedom	Daithí Ó Fallamháin	0.4	246	252	279				
Independent	Gráinne de Barra	0.1	84	89	119				
Independent	Stephen Manning	0.1	65	68	82				
Independent	Seán Forkin	0.1	59	63	82				
Electorate: 98,165 Valid: 64,353 Spoilt: 553 Quota: 12,871 Turnout: 64,906 (66.1%)

=== 2016 general election ===
2016 general election: Mayo
Party	Candidate	FPv%	Count									
Party	Candidate	FPv%	1	2	3	4	5	6	7	8	9	10
Fine Gael	Enda Kenny	20.9	13,318									
Fine Gael	Michael Ring	17.7	11,275	11,533	11,534	11,545	11,558	11,567	11,613	12,034	13,149	
Fianna Fáil	Dara Calleary	14.8	9,402	9,417	9,419	9,432	9,441	9,450	9,495	9,933	10,425	12,150
Fianna Fáil	Lisa Chambers	12.9	8,231	8,265	8,266	8,280	8,296	8,307	8,354	8,718	9,503	11,686
Fine Gael	Michelle Mulherin	12.3	7,841	8,084	8,088	8,094	8,123	8,131	8,182	8,496	8,900	9,593
Sinn Féin	Rose Conway-Walsh	10.1	6,414	6,423	6,423	6,445	6,453	6,485	6,548	7,022	7,853	
Independent	Jerry Cowley	5.5	3,479	3,495	3,504	3,513	3,523	3,553	3,668	4,375		
Renua	Michael Farrington	2.5	1,574	1,579	1,582	1,590	1,600	1,608	1,659			
Green	Margaret Sheehan	1.0	629	631	632	636	651	665	680			
AAA–PBP	Tom Moran	0.9	576	577	582	587	597	626	664			
Independent	George O'Malley	0.4	262	263	263	276	284	301				
Independent	Peter Jordan	0.3	176	176	181	189	192	197				
Independent	Stephen Manning	0.2	157	158	159	166	174					
Independent	Mohammad Kamal Uddin	0.2	144	146	149	150						
Independent	Gerry O'Boyle	0.2	126	127	130							
Independent	Seán Forkin	0.1	42	42								
Electorate: 92,958 Valid: 63,646 Spoilt: 600 Quota: 12,730 Turnout: 69.1%

=== 2011 general election ===
2011 general election: Mayo
Party	Candidate	FPv%	Count							
Party	Candidate	FPv%	1	2	3	4	5	6	7	8
Fine Gael	Enda Kenny	23.6	17,472							
Fine Gael	Michael Ring	17.8	13,180							
Fine Gael	Michelle Mulherin	11.9	8,851	10,814	11,110	11,434	11,577	11,672	12,162	13,303
Fine Gael	John O'Mahony	11.7	8,667	10,290	10,511	10,688	10,864	11,004	11,340	12,111
Fianna Fáil	Dara Calleary	11.6	8,577	8,745	8,775	8,969	9,063	11,602	12,222	12,997
Independent	Michael Kilcoyne	5.4	3,996	4,641	4,715	4,947	5,128	5,462	6,137	7,379
Labour	Jerry Cowley	4.9	3,644	3,955	4,037	4,294	4,529	4,714	5,899	
Fianna Fáil	Lisa Chambers	4.5	3,343	3,464	3,491	3,552	3,619			
Sinn Féin	Rose Conway-Walsh	3.6	2,660	2,752	2,813	2,939	4,367	4,527		
Sinn Féin	Thérèse Ruane	2.9	2,142	2,260	2,277	2,438				
New Vision	Martin Daly (Note: New Vision was an electoral alliance of independent non-party candidates and did not appear on the ballot.)	1.2	893	919	926					
Green	John Carey	0.4	266	280	282					
Independent	Dermot McDonnell	0.3	216	237	238					
Independent	Loretta Clarke	0.3	218	226	228					
Independent	Seán Forkin	0.0	29	31	31					
Electorate: 99,504 Valid: 74,154 Spoilt: 641 (0.9%) Quota: 12,360 Turnout: 74,795 (75.2%)

=== 2007 general election ===
2007 general election: Mayo
Party	Candidate	FPv%	Count							
Party	Candidate	FPv%	1	2	3	4	5	6	7	8
Fine Gael	Enda Kenny	20.6	14,717							
Fine Gael	Michael Ring	16.0	11,412	12,441						
Fianna Fáil	Dara Calleary	10.1	7,225	7,248	7,251	7,438	7,699	8,803	9,345	11,269
Fine Gael	John O'Mahony	9.6	6,869	7,544	7,759	8,003	8,717	8,855	9,587	13,736
Independent	Beverley Flynn	9.5	6,779	7,131	7,212	7,387	8,043	9,322	10,684	11,250
Fianna Fáil	John Carty	8.2	5,889	5,926	5,937	5,991	6,519	7,825	8,214	8,303
Fine Gael	Michelle Mulherin	7.6	5,428	5,877	6,016	6,416	6,681	6,763	7,644	
Fianna Fáil	Frank Chambers	6.1	4,345	4,386	4,406	4,499	4,705			
Sinn Féin	Gerry Murray	5.1	3,608	3,660	3,668	3,845				
Independent	Jerry Cowley	4.8	3,407	3,487	3,529	3,910	4,784	5,342		
Labour	Harry Barrett	1.2	831	896	917					
Green	Peter Enright	0.8	580	594	597					
Progressive Democrats	Tommy Cooke	0.4	296	298	298					
Electorate: 98,696 Valid: 71,386 Spoilt: 700 (1.0%) Quota: 11,898 Turnout: 72,086 (73.0%)

=== 2002 general election ===
2002 general election: Mayo
Party	Candidate	FPv%	Count									
Party	Candidate	FPv%	1	2	3	4	5	6	7	8	9	10
Fine Gael	Michael Ring	15.6	9,880	10,045	10,384	10,576	10,907					
Independent	Jerry Cowley	13.7	8,709	9,213	9,808	10,573	11,128					
Fianna Fáil	Beverley Flynn	10.5	6,661	6,741	6,886	7,123	7,167	7,178	7,187	9,517	9,749	9,910
Fianna Fáil	Tom Moffatt	10.3	6,536	6,749	6,892	7,084	7,521	7,661	7,697	8,625	8,878	9,187
Fianna Fáil	John Carty	10.2	6,457	6,512	6,555	6,756	6,817	6,822	6,824	8,284	9,531	10,157
Fine Gael	Jim Higgins	9.2	5,858	5,971	6,035	6,155	6,833	6,998	7,100	7,220		
Fine Gael	Enda Kenny	9.2	5,834	5,954	6,045	6,142	6,478	6,576	6,707	7,307	11,922	
Fianna Fáil	Frank Chambers	9.0	5,726	5,792	6,045	6,266	6,307	6,315	6,319			
Fine Gael	Ernie Caffrey	3.6	2,290	2,419	2,486	2,558						
Sinn Féin	Vincent Wood	3.3	2,085	2,181	2,274							
Independent	Michael Holmes	2.8	1,754	1,873								
Progressive Democrats	Billy Heffron	1.5	919									
Green	Ann Crowley	1.1	669									
Independent	Thomas King	0.2	102									
Electorate: 94,854 Valid: 63,480 Spoilt: 790 (1.2%) Quota: 10,581 Turnout: 64,270 (67.8%)

=== 1997 general election ===
1997 general election: Mayo
Party	Candidate	FPv%	Count							
Party	Candidate	FPv%	1	2	3	4	5	6	7	8
Fine Gael	Michael Ring	16.3	10,066	10,143	10,350					
Fine Gael	Enda Kenny	13.9	8,568	8,626	8,797	8,989	9,083	10,210	10,428	
Fianna Fáil	Beverley Cooper-Flynn	13.5	8,353	8,418	8,511	8,653	8,766	8,944	11,087	
Fine Gael	Jim Higgins	11.2	6,945	7,006	7,069	7,671	7,801	9,974	11,163	
Fianna Fáil	Séamus Hughes	11.0	6,791	6,859	6,953	7,008	7,092	7,151	8,169	8,395
Fianna Fáil	Tom Moffatt	9.3	5,735	5,765	5,801	5,820	6,384	7,861	9,453	9,676
Fianna Fáil	P. J. Morley	9.2	5,692	5,795	5,847	6,378	6,458	6,497		
Fine Gael	Ernie Caffrey	7.4	4,579	4,608	4,673	4,701	5,407			
Independent	Gerry Ginty	2.7	1,656	1,842	1,941	2,079				
Independent	Richard Finn	2.7	1,683	1,729	1,800					
Green	Ann Crowley	1.5	938	1,022						
National Party	Ciarán Sherry	1.2	733							
Independent	Cormac Connie Cullen	0.2	119							
Electorate: 87,719 Valid: 61,858 Spoilt: 614 (1.0%) Quota: 10,310 Turnout: 62,472 (71.2%)

== See also ==
- Elections in the Republic of Ireland
- Politics of the Republic of Ireland
- List of political parties in the Republic of Ireland
