= Assembly Buildings (Presbyterian Church in Ireland) =

Building in Belfast, Northern Ireland

Coordinates: 54.59597°N 5.93412°W

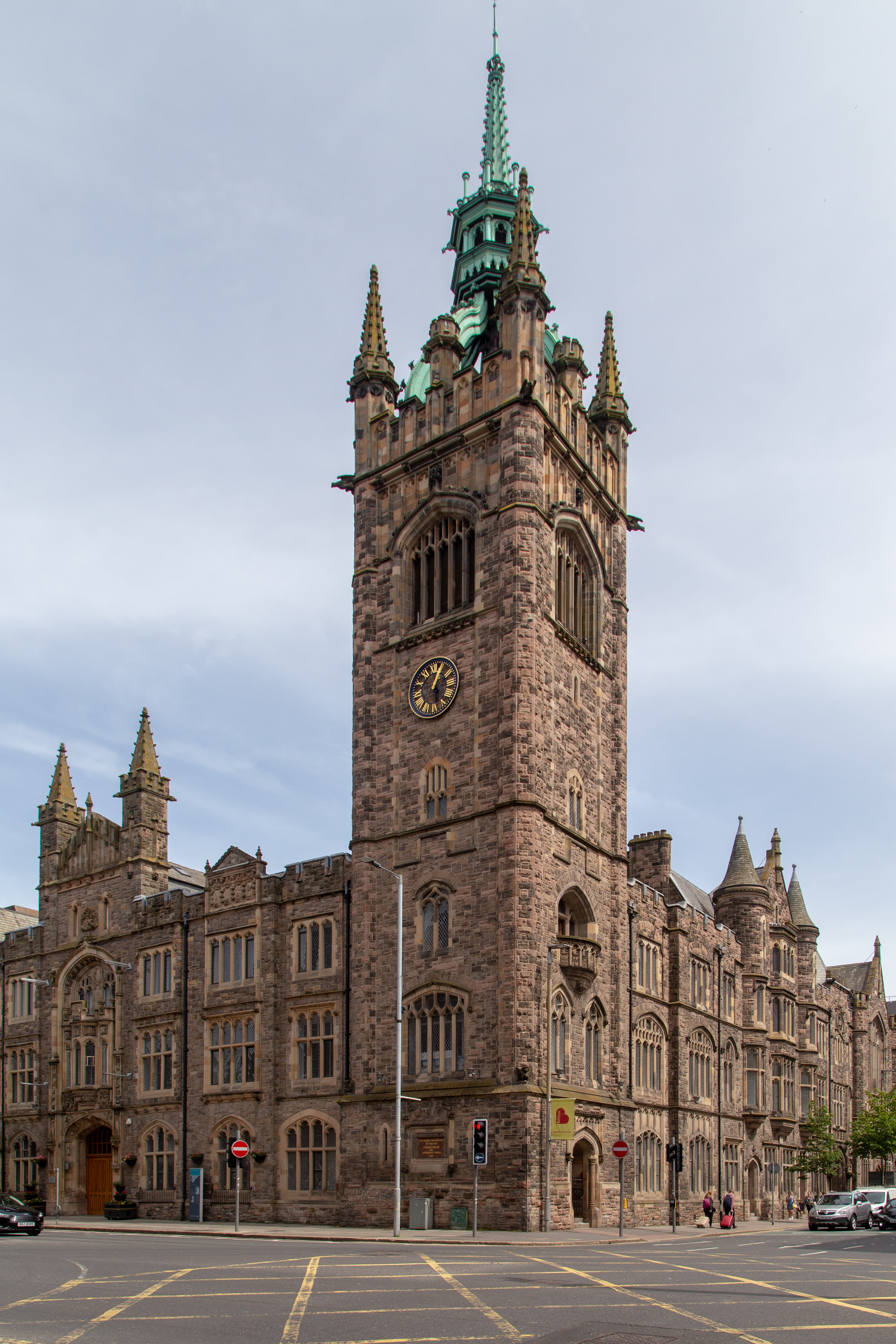
The Assembly Buildings in 2018

The Assembly Buildings, formerly known as Church House, in Belfast, Northern Ireland, are the headquarters of the Presbyterian Church in Ireland. It was refurbished in 1992 and also functions as a commercial conference centre. Although there was a decision taken to move to a new location the General Assembly, in 2006, voted to overturn the decision.

== Location ==
The building is located near the centre of Belfast at the junction of Fisherwick Place, Great Victoria Street, Howard Street and Grosvenor Road. It was built in 1905, in the Gothic style, and opened by the Duke of Argyll. It is dominated by a 40m high clock tower, which contains Belfast's only peal of 12 bells.

It is home to the General Assembly of the Presbyterian Church in Ireland. The Assembly Hall is oval-shaped with a gallery, and can seat 1,300 people. The hall is illuminated by a glass skylight, which is now illuminated artificially. In 2005, the General Assembly announced that they planned to move their headquarters from the Assembly Buildings after receiving six offers for the building. It was initially approved by the General Assembly with the provision that they could still meet there. However in 2006, the General Assembly reversed the decision and voted in favour of retaining the Assembly Buildings.

== Commercial use ==
Following its refurbishment in 1992 following damage from a bomb blast, it was reopened by Princess Diana. From there, the Assembly Buildings also function as a commercial conference centre, Assembly Buildings Conference Centre as well as The Spires shopping centre being opened on the site. However, in 2016, the Presbyterian Church announced that they were closing the shopping centre in order to expand the Assembly Buildings' conference facilities.
