= Matthew W. Mulherin =

American politician

Member of the Georgia House of Representatives
- In office 1971–1974

Personal details
- Born: April 14, 1925 Richmond County, Georgia, U.S.
- Died: May 12, 2007 (aged 82)
- Party: Democratic
- Education: Georgia Institute of Technology

Matthew W. Mulherin (April 14, 1925 – May 12, 2007) was an American politician. He served as a Democratic member of the Georgia House of Representatives.

== Life and career ==
Mulherin was born in Richmond County, Georgia. He attended Georgia Institute of Technology.

Mulherin served in the Georgia House of Representatives from 1971 to 1974.

Mulherin died on May 12, 2007, at the age of 82.
