= General John Regan (play) =

General John Regan is a comedy play by the Irish writer George A. Birmingham. A confidence trickster convinces a small Irish town that a statue ought to be erected to one of its natives who is claimed to have led the independence movement of a South American country, closely modelled on Bernardo O'Higgins.

It premiered at the Apollo Theatre in London on 8 January 1913 where it had a long run. Its American premiere was at the Hudson Theatre in New York on 13 November 1913. It received good reviews from critics, and was commercially successful. When it was first staged at Westport, Ireland it provoked a riot as the crowd objected to the depiction of what they felt was a mocking representation of their town (where the writer served as an Anglican clergyman).

== Adaptations ==
The play has been adapted to film several times. In 1921 a silent version General John Regan was made. In 1933 a sound version General John Regan was made starring Henry Edwards and Chrissie White.
