= Ger Feeney =

Irish Gaelic footballer

Ger Feeney (c. 1954 – 10 October 2010) was an Irish Gaelic footballer who played for the Mayo county team.

== Personal life ==
Feeney was a native of Cortoon, Ballintubber, and studied at Ballinafad College. He was a highly regarded GAA player in the 1970s. He won a minor All-Ireland title in 1971 and an U21 winners medal in 1974. He made his championship debut for Mayo in 1972 against Sligo at McHale Park, Castlebar.

His sons Richie and Alan Feeney, and his nephew, John Feeney, are all members of the Mayo football squad. One of his brothers was a Mayo county secretary, Sean Feeney.

== Death ==
He and his close friend, businessman Donal McEllin, drowned in a boating accident off Inishbofin in October 2010.

Feeney was survived by his wife Kathleen (née Caden) and their four children, Richie, Alan, Claire and Darragh (14 at the time), who was in St Gerald's College, Castlebar at the time of his father's death.
