= Paul Lawless (politician) =

Irish politician

Paul Lawless TD
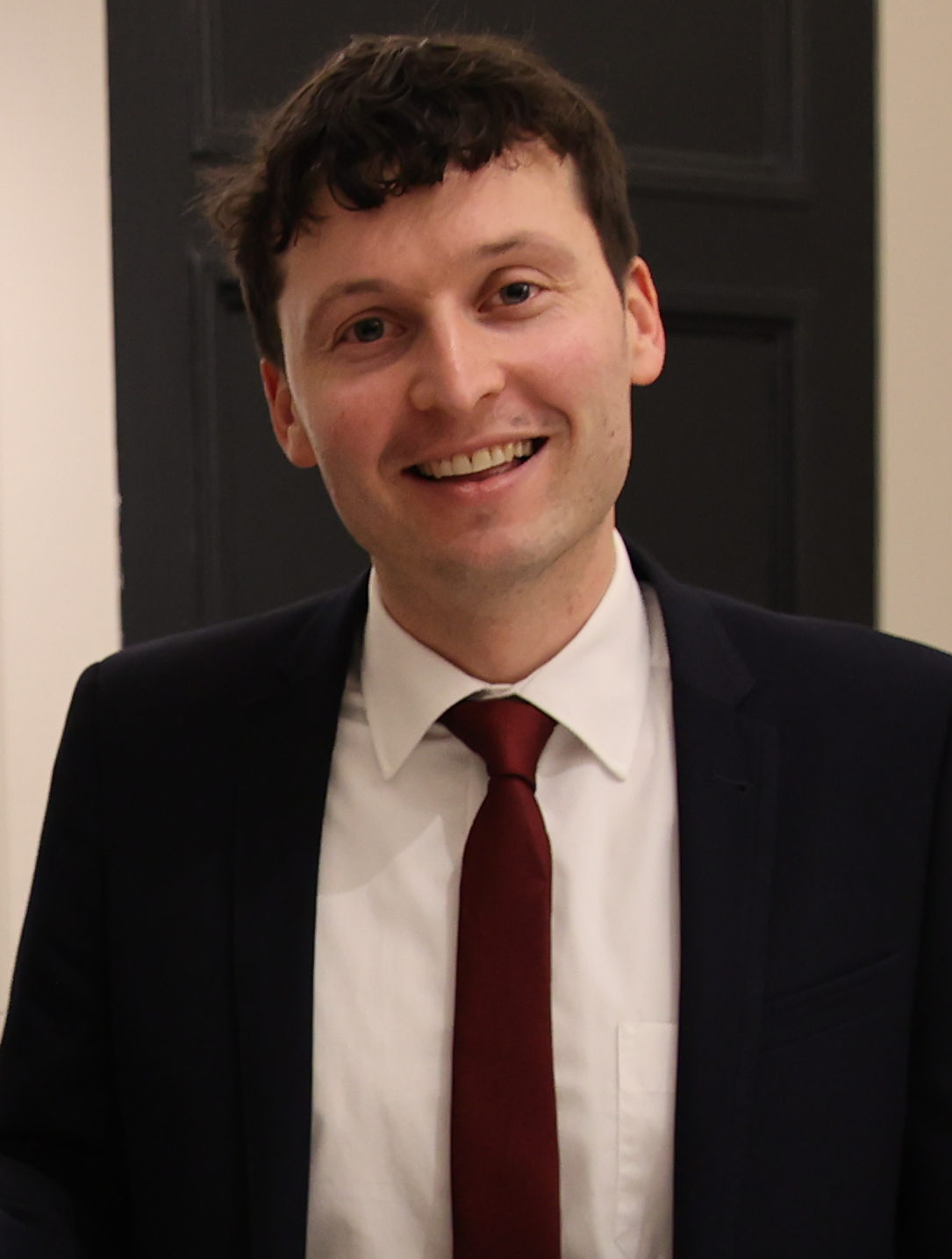
- Lawless in 2024

Teachta Dála
- Incumbent
- Assumed office November 2024
- Constituency: Mayo

Personal details
- Born: 1996/1997 (age 28–29)
- Party: Aontú
- Education: University College Cork; Clayton State University

Paul Lawless (born 1996/1997) is an Irish Aontú politician who has been a Teachta Dála (TD) for the Mayo constituency since the 2024 general election.

== Background ==
He played soccer at a youth level and signed a contract for Derby County F.C. He also played Gaelic football for Aghamore GAA Club in east Mayo.

Lawless studied Physical education and History at University College Cork, qualifying as a secondary school teacher and also gained an MBA from Clayton State University, Georgia, USA. Lawless played college soccer for the Clayton State Lakers. In July 2023, he was appointed a peace commissioner by the minister of justice. At the time of his election to the Dáil, Lawless was a maths and physical education teacher at the community school in Ballyhaunis, County Mayo.

== Political career ==
As a teenager, Lawless volunteered for the Libertas Ireland political party. Lawless ran in Mayo for Aontú at the 2020 general election, receiving 4% of the vote and was not elected. He also unsuccessfully contested the Seanad elections in that same year. He was elected to Mayo County Council at the 2024 local elections.

At the 2024 general election, Lawless was elected to the Dáil.

Dáil	Election	Deputy (Party)	Deputy (Party)	Deputy (Party)	Deputy (Party)	Deputy (Party)
28th	1997	Beverley Flynn (FF)	Tom Moffatt (FF)	Enda Kenny (FG)	Michael Ring (FG)	Jim Higgins (FG)
29th	2002	Beverley Flynn (FF)	John Carty (FF)	Enda Kenny (FG)	Michael Ring (FG)	Jerry Cowley (Ind.)
30th	2007	Beverley Flynn (Ind.)	Dara Calleary (FF)	Enda Kenny (FG)	Michael Ring (FG)	John O'Mahony (FG)
31st	2011	Michelle Mulherin (FG)	Dara Calleary (FF)	Enda Kenny (FG)	Michael Ring (FG)	John O'Mahony (FG)
32nd	2016	Lisa Chambers (FF)	Dara Calleary (FF)	Enda Kenny (FG)	Michael Ring (FG)	4 seats 2016–2024
33rd	2020	Rose Conway-Walsh (SF)	Dara Calleary (FF)	Alan Dillon (FG)	Michael Ring (FG)	4 seats 2016–2024
34th	2024	Rose Conway-Walsh (SF)	Dara Calleary (FF)	Alan Dillon (FG)	Keira Keogh (FG)	Paul Lawless (Aon)
