= Niall McGarry =

Irish entrepreneur

- Born: 1978 (age 47–48); Castlebar, County Mayo, Ireland
- Education: St. Gerald's College
- Occupation: Social media entrepreneur
- Years active: 2014–present
- Known for: Maximum Media

Niall McGarry is an Irish entrepreneur who was the owner and founder of JOE.ie and Her.ie, social media websites in Ireland. Both websites were owned and ran by Maximum Media, the umbrella company founded by McGarry.

== Career ==
McGarry attended St. Gerald's College in Castlebar, County Mayo. He then studied at Limerick Institute of Technology with rugby union player Jerry Flannery. After graduating in 2002 with a degree in Marketing Management, McGarry worked for just over a year in advertising sales for the Galway Independent in Galway City.

=== Impact Media ===
In 2003 in joined forces with Tom Lynskey and founded Impact Media. The company grew and represented clients including Supermacs, Eircom and Radisson Hotels. Having grown the company to a 20-strong workforce, McGarry and Lynskey sold the business to Cork company H+A Marketing+PR in 2011.

=== Joe.ie and Her.ie ===
McGarry originally created Joe.ie in 2010, an online website and media group targeting Irish males in areas like sport, tech, entertainment, motors and fashion.

McGarry created Her.ie, a site that caters for Irish women in July 2012.

In November 2019 McGarry announced that he was going to step away from executive involvement in the Irish business and would focus instead on its business in the UK, where he launched its Joe digital platform in 2015. This followed allegations of click farming and inflated viewer figures provided to advertisers in its Irish business. The scandal ultimately lead to the cessation of some sponsorship and brand partnerships with the company ultimately entering a restructuring examinership in May 2020 resulting ultimately in its sale. In July 2020 it was bought by investment fund Greencastle Capital.

=== Fabric social ===
In 2026, it was announced that McGarry sold his business Fabric Social to Publicis.
