= Richie Feeney =

Irish Gaelic footballer

Personal information
- Native name: Risteard Ó Fiannaí (Irish)
- Born: Castlebar, Ireland
- Height: 1.83 m (6 ft 0 in)

Sport
- Sport: Gaelic football
- Position: Right half forward
Club
- Years: Club
- ?–: Castlebar Mitchels
Club titles
- Mayo titles: 1
- Connacht titles: 1
Inter-county
- Years: County
- 2011–2015: Mayo
Inter-county titles
- Connacht titles: 4

Richie Feeney is a former Gaelic footballer who played for the Mayo county team.

A Right half back in the Mayo senior team, Feeney began playing with Castlebar Mitchels. He is the brother of fellow-player Alan Feeney, He is a son of the late Ger Feeney, who won a minor All-Ireland in 1971 and an Under 21 title three years later. He is widely acknowledged as one of Mayo's finest ever half-backs. Feeney played Forward in the 2012 and 2013 league.

In 2010, he was named Senior Footballer of the Year.
