= The Seething Pot =

1905 novel by George A. Birmingham

- Author: George A. Birmingham
- Language: English
- Publication date: 1905

The Seething Pot is a roman à clef written by George A. Birmingham, which negatively portrays various individuals and organizations of County Mayo. It was first published in 1905. The novel has been called an "excellent study of life in the west of Ireland."

A seething pot (also seethingpot or seething-pot) is a vessel for boiling provisions mentioned in the King James Bible at Job 41:20 and Jer. 1:13.
