= Michelle Mulherin =

Irish former politician (born 1972)

Senator
- In office 8 June 2016 – 29 June 2020
- Constituency: Nominated by the Taoiseach

Teachta Dála
- In office February 2011 – February 2016
- Constituency: Mayo

Personal details
- Born: 20 January 1972 (age 54) Ballina, County Mayo, Ireland
- Party: Fine Gael
- Education: University College Dublin

Michelle Mulherin (born 20 January 1972) is an Irish former Fine Gael politician who served as a Senator from 2016 to 2020, after being nominated by the Taoiseach. She served as a Teachta Dála (TD) for the Mayo constituency from 2011 to 2016.

== Career ==
She was elected as a Fine Gael TD for the Mayo constituency at the 2011 general election. She was elected to Ballina Town Council in 1999 and has also as a Mayo County Councillor from 2004, until her election to Dáil Éireann in 2011. Mulherin also sat on the European Committee of the Regions from 2005 until her election to the Dáil. Mulherin unsuccessfully stood for election in the Mayo constituency at the 2007 general election. She lost her seat at the 2016 general election.

Mulherin was nominated by the Taoiseach Enda Kenny to the 25th Seanad in May 2016.

She was the Fine Gael Seanad spokesperson on Agriculture, Food and the Marine. She was an unsuccessful candidate for the Mayo constituency at the 2020 general election.

== Controversies ==
In March 2011, Mulherin criticised the Libyan National Transitional Council during the 2011 Libyan Civil War, saying that it was an "internal matter" and that "oil was what made Libya 'special' and the external interference from countries such as the US is worrying". Mulherin was not disciplined for her comments, which dissented against the official Fine Gael policy.

Several months later, in June 2011, she was among a number of backbench Fine Gael TDs who criticised the level of payments being made to the unemployed. She called for National service to be introduced in order to tackle a "culture of entitlement". This proposal was criticised by a senior member of Fine Gael, who described the proposal as not being "out of place at a convention of the Tea Party movement in America".

In April 2012, she spoke in a Dáil Éireann debate on the subject of limited abortion. In her brief contribution she described the liberating grace of God and the "fallen nature" of all people, and claimed that "fornication, I would say, is probably the single most likely cause of unwanted pregnancies in this country". This was criticised by TDs who favoured more access to abortion, including the independent Luke 'Ming' Flanagan and Clare Daly, the Socialist Party representative who had proposed the bill being debated. In a television interview a few days later, she clarified that by 'fornication' she had meant 'consensual sex between adults who are not married to each other'.

In March 2013, Mulherin accused youth information site Spunout.ie of publishing inappropriate sex education content. Mulherin claimed that the information on the site was "incredibly regressive" and said that she would raise the issue of funding for the site with Health Minister James Reilly.

In January and February 2015, Mulherin paid €3,295 to the Leinster House authorities for 130 phone calls she made from her Leinster House phone to an individual in Kenya who previously worked on her election campaign.

In 2016, after Mayo reached the All-Ireland Football Final, she claimed she should have a right to a ticket for the Final because she was a Senator. This was despite the fact that she admitted to having attended only two of Mayo's matches en route to the final.

| Dáil | Election | Deputy (Party) | Deputy (Party) | Deputy (Party) | Deputy (Party) | Deputy (Party) |
|---|---|---|---|---|---|---|
| 28th | 1997 | Beverley Flynn (FF) | Tom Moffatt (FF) | Enda Kenny (FG) | Michael Ring (FG) | Jim Higgins (FG) |
| 29th | 2002 | Beverley Flynn (FF) | John Carty (FF) | Enda Kenny (FG) | Michael Ring (FG) | Jerry Cowley (Ind.) |
| 30th | 2007 | Beverley Flynn (Ind.) | Dara Calleary (FF) | Enda Kenny (FG) | Michael Ring (FG) | John O'Mahony (FG) |
| 31st | 2011 | Michelle Mulherin (FG) | Dara Calleary (FF) | Enda Kenny (FG) | Michael Ring (FG) | John O'Mahony (FG) |
| 32nd | 2016 | Lisa Chambers (FF) | Dara Calleary (FF) | Enda Kenny (FG) | Michael Ring (FG) | 4 seats 2016–2024 |
| 33rd | 2020 | Rose Conway-Walsh (SF) | Dara Calleary (FF) | Alan Dillon (FG) | Michael Ring (FG) | 4 seats 2016–2024 |
| 34th | 2024 | Rose Conway-Walsh (SF) | Dara Calleary (FF) | Alan Dillon (FG) | Keira Keogh (FG) | Paul Lawless (Aon) |
