= George A. Birmingham =

Irish clergyman and novelist

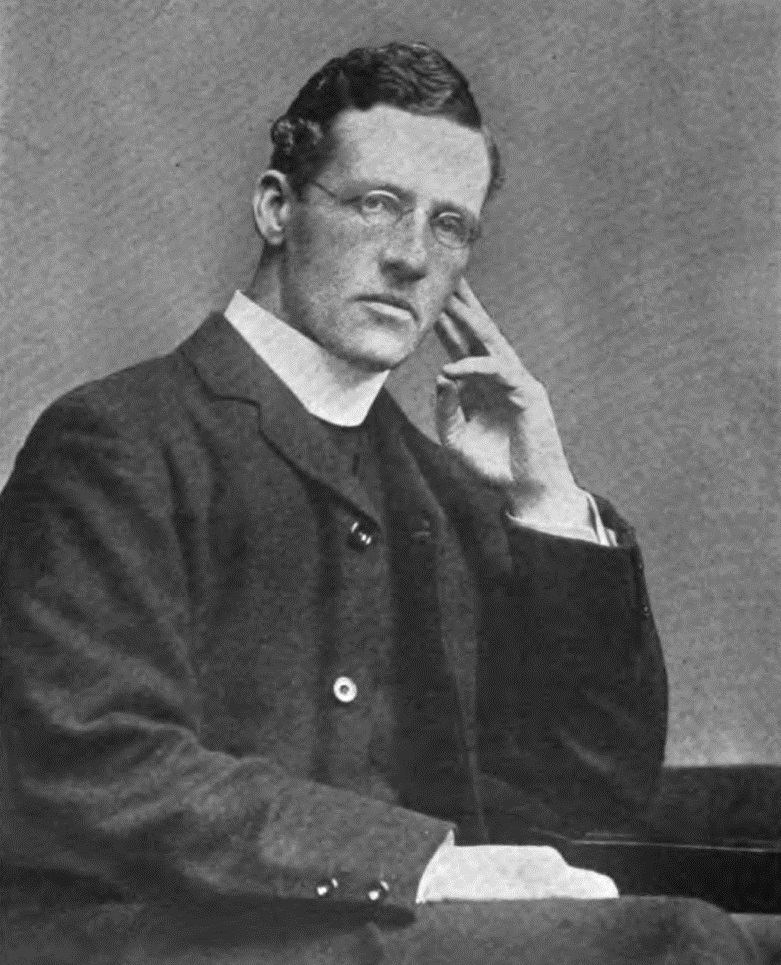
George A. Birmingham

George A. Birmingham was the pen name of James Owen Hannay (16 July 1865 – 2 February 1950), Irish clergyman and prolific novelist. He was active in the Gaelic League, but strained his relations with Irish nationalists by supporting Robert Lindsay Crawford in his opposition to clerical control of education.

== Protestant Churchman and Gaelic Leaguer ==
Hannay was born in Belfast and educated at Methodist College Belfast from 1883 to 1884 before attending Trinity College, Dublin. He was ordained in 1889 as a Church of Ireland (Anglican) minister and from 1904 served as rector of Holy Trinity Church, Westport in County Mayo.

Participation in language revival activities in Mayo and defence of the Gaelic League in the Church of Ireland Gazette led to Hannay being co-opted onto the League's national executive body in December 1904. His personal network of Irish Irelanders included Gaelic League President Douglas Hyde and the principal ideologue of the emergent Sinn Féin movement, United Irishman editor Arthur Griffith. They were sympathetic to Hannay's desire for a "union of the two Irish democracies", Catholic in the south and Protestant in the north. In the north, in Ulster, he saw a potential ally in Lindsay Crawford, Grand Master of the new Independent Orange Order. He regarded the breakaway Order, like the Gaelic League as "profoundly democratic in spirit" and independent of "the rich and the patronage of the great".

Hannay's defence of Crawford's opposition to the clerical control of education in Ireland, however, strained his relations with Irish nationalists, and it was a position that had little support in their own church. The Church of Ireland Gazette dubbed Crawford "the solitary champion of secularism in the Synod". Hannay withdrew from the Gaelic League in the wake of ongoing protests about the tour of his successful play General John Regan.

== Later career ==
Hannay became rector of Kildare parish from 1918 to 1920, and after serving as chaplain to the Viceroy of Ireland, he joined the British ambassadorial team in Budapest in 1922. He returned to officiate at Mells, Somerset from 1924 to 1934, after which he was appointed vicar of Holy Trinity Church in the London suburb of Kensington where he served from 1934 to his death in 1950.

== Sailing ==
James Hannay enjoyed sailing, and was taught the rudiments by his father and grandfather in Belfast. When he was based in Westport, his financial success of his writing enabled him to purchase a boat. He bought a Dublin Bay Water Wag. In recognition of Hannay, the Water Wag Club of Dun Laoghaire returned to Westport and Clew Bay in 2016.

In the frontispiece of his book The Inviolable Sanctuary, George A. Birmingham includes a picture of the Water Wag.

== Publications ==
- The Seething Pot (1905)
- Hyacinth (1906)
- Benedict Kavanagh (1907)
- The Northern Iron (1907)
- The Bad Times (1908)
- Spanish Gold (1908)
- The Search Party (1909)
- Lalage's Lovers (1911)
- The Major's Niece (1911)
- The Simpkins Plot (1911)
- The Inviolable Sanctuary (1911)
  - Also published under the title Priscilla's Spies
- The Red Hand of Ulster (1912)
- Do (1913)
- General John Regan: A Play in Three Acts (1913)
- The Adventures of Dr. Whitty (1913)
- Connaught to Chicago (1914) [also printed as From Dublin to Chicago]
- The Lost Tribes (1914)
- Gossamer (1915)
- Minnie's Bishop and Other Stories (1915)
- The Island Mystery (1918)
- Our Casualty (1919)
- Up the Rebels! (1919)
- Inisheeny (1920)
- Good Conduct (1920)
- Lady Bountiful (1921)
- The Lost Lawyer (1921)
- The Great-Grandmother (1922)
- A Public Scandal (1922)
- Fed Up (1923)
- Found Money (1923)
- King Tommy (1923)
- Send for Dr Grady (1923)
- The Grand Duchess (1924)
- Bindon Parva (1925)
- The Gun-Runners (1925)
- Goodly Pearls (1926)
- The Smuggler's Cave (1926)
- Lady of the Abbey (1926)
- Now You Tell One: Stories of Irish Wit & Humour (1927)
- Fidgets (1927)
- Ships and Sealing Wax (1927)
- Elizabeth and the Archdeacon (1928)
- The Runaways (1928)
- The Major's Candlesticks (1929)
- Murder Most Foul! (1929)
- The Hymn Tune Mystery (1930)
- Wild Justice (1930)
- The Silver-Gilt Standard (1932)
- Angel's Adventure (1933)
- Two Fools (1934)
- Love or Money (1935)
- Millicent's Corner (1935)
- Daphne's Fishing (1937)
- Mrs. Miller's Aunt (1937)
- Magilligan Strand (1938)
- Appeasement (1939)
- Miss Maitland's Spy (1940)
- The Search for Susie (1941)
- Over the Border (1942)
- Poor Sir Edward (1943)
- Lieutenant Commander (1944)
- Good Intentions (1945)
- The Piccadilly Lady (1946)
- Golden Apple (1947)
- A Sea Battle (1948)
- Laura's Bishop (1949)
- Two Scamps (1950)

=== Other works ===
- The Spirit and Origin of Christian Monasticism (1903) from his Donnellan Lectures
- The Wisdom of the Desert (1904)
- Irishmen All (1913)
- The Lighter Side of Irish Life (1911)
- Golden Sayings from George A. Birmingham (1915)
- Recollections of Sir Jonah Barrington (1918)
- A Padre in France (1918)
- An Irishman Looks at His World (1918)
- A Wayfarer in Hungary (1925)
- Spillikins: Essays (1926)
- Can You Answer This? A Question Book (1927)
- Do you Know Your History? A History Questions Book (1928)
- Pleasant Places (1934)
