= 1999 Mayo County Council election =

Part of the 1999 Irish local elections

← 1991	10 June 1999	2004 →

All 31 seats to Mayo County Council
	First party	Second party	Third party
Party	Fianna Fáil	Fine Gael	Labour
Seats won	16	13	1
Seat change	+1	-	-
	Fourth party
Party	Independent
Seats won	1
Seat change	-1
- Map showing the area of Mayo County Council
Council control after election
Fianna Fail

An election to Mayo County Council took place on 10 June 1999 as part of that year's Irish local elections. 31 councillors were elected from seven local electoral areas for a five-year term of office on the system of proportional representation by means of the single transferable vote (PR-STV).

== Results by party ==
Party	Seats	±	First Pref. votes	FPv%	±%
Fianna Fáil	16	+1	26,119	46.18	
Fine Gael	13	-	23,414	41.39	
Labour	1	-	1,021	1.81	
Independent	1	-1	4,814	8.51	
Totals	31	-	56,564	100.00	—

== Results by local electoral area ==
=== Ballina ===
Ballina - 6 seats
Party	Candidate	FPv%	Count						
Party	Candidate	FPv%	1	2	3	4	5	6	7
Fianna Fáil	Annie Mae Reape*	16.39	1,818						
Fine Gael	Senator Ernie Caffrey*	15.68	1,629						
Fine Gael	Seamus Weir	11.36	1,260	1,288	1,369	1,430	1,541	1,644	
Fianna Fáil	Stephen Molloy*	10.87	1,206	1,235	1,287	1,353	1,381	1,385	1,386
Fine Gael	Eddie Staunton*	10.60	1,176	1,195	1,285	1,325	1,721		
Fianna Fáil	Brian Golden*	9.63	1,069	1,094	1,118	1,217	1,504	1,531	1,545
Fianna Fáil	John O'Donnell	9.98	1,107	1,199	1,218	1,322	1,333	1,334	1,339
Fine Gael	Vinnie Munnelly	7.99	886	893	906	964			
Sinn Féin	John Clarke	5.50	610	633	649				
Independent	Bernard Flynn	3.01	334	343					
Electorate: 18,303 Valid: 11,095 (60.62%) Spoilt: 162 Quota: 1,586 Turnout: 11,257 (61.50%)

=== Ballinrobe ===
Ballinrobe - 3 seats
Party	Candidate	FPv%	Count				
Party	Candidate	FPv%	1	2	3	4	5
Fine Gael	Michael Burke*	21.73	1,218	1,289	1,460		
Independent	Harry Walsh	19.25	1,079	1,197	1,253	1,291	1,306
Fine Gael	Jim Mannion*	17.90	1,003	1,134	1,296	1,322	1,365
Fianna Fáil	Damien Ryan	16.63	932	1,062	1,466		
Fianna Fáil	Nora Conroy	12.79	717	894			
Fianna Fáil	Noel Hughes	10.10	566				
Green	Ben Ryan	1.59	89				
Electorate: 15,503 Valid: 8,332 (53.74%) Spoilt: 74 Quota: 1,667 Turnout: 8,406 (54.22%)

=== Belmullet ===
Belmullet - 4 seats
Party	Candidate	FPv%	Count						
Party	Candidate	FPv%	1	2	3	4	5	6	7
Fianna Fáil	Tim Quinn*	18.63	1,338	1,379	1,476				
Fine Gael	Pat Kilbane*	16.05	1,153	1,159	1,164	1,448			
Fine Gael	Ian McAndrews	14.09	1,012	1,033	1,112	1,114	1,126	1,127	1,194
Fine Gael	Gerry Coyle	14.05	1,009	1,059	1,203	1,205	1,213	1,213	1,309
Independent	Michael Holmes	10.99	789	801	843	933	938	944	
Fianna Fáil	Michael McNulty	8.62	619	621	623				
Fianna Fáil	Frank Leneghan	8.55	614	632	715	927	941	945	1,333
Independent	Paraic Cosgrove*	6.25	449	480					
Independent	Tony Mullarkey	2.77	199						
Electorate: 11,374 Valid: 7,182 (63.14%) Spoilt: 107 Quota: 1,437 Turnout: 7,289 (64.08%)

=== Castlebar ===
Castlebar - 6 seats
Party	Candidate	FPv%	Count						
Party	Candidate	FPv%	1	2	3	4	5	6	7
Fianna Fáil	Beverley Cooper Flynn TD*	18.24	2,047						
Fianna Fáil	Al McDonnell*	11.82	1,326	1,404	1,439	1,489	1,530	1,721	
Fine Gael	Senator Paddy Burke*	11.66	1,309	1,337	1,360	1,375	1,562	1,688	
Fianna Fáil	Seán Bourke	10.76	1,207	1,373	1,418	1,538	1,597	1,835	
Fine Gael	Henry Kenny*	9.94	1,116	1,140	1,170	1,217	1,396	1,492	1,517
Labour	Johnny Mee*	9.10	1,021	1,058	1,151	1,191	1,312	1,499	1,559
Fine Gael	John Devaney*	7.78	873	881	897	1,080	1,126	1,149	1,160
Fianna Fáil	Iarla Duffy	7.00	786	842	872	907	963		
Fine Gael	Eoin Garavan	6.09	683	702	719	727			
Fianna Fáil	Gerry Rowland	4.52	507	522	538				
Sinn Féin	Joe McHale	2.23	250	258					
Green	Dr. Lucille Ryan-O'Shea	0.86	97	101					
Electorate: 19,200 Valid: 11,222 (58.45%) Spoilt: 140 Quota: 1,604 Turnout: 11,362 (59.18%)

=== Claremorris ===
Claremorris - 4 seats
Party	Candidate	FPv%	Count	
Party	Candidate	FPv%	1	2
Fianna Fáil	John Carty*	25.26	1,758	
Independent	Richard Finn*	20.49	1,426	
Fine Gael	John Cribbin	19.40	1,350	1,442
Fianna Fáil	Patrick McHugh*	18.43	1,283	1,508
Fine Gael	Tom Connolly	16.42	1,143	1,191
Electorate: 11,222 Valid: 6,960 (62.02%) Spoilt: 90 Quota: 1,393 Turnout: 7,050 (62.82%)

=== Swinford ===
Swinford - 4 seats
Party	Candidate	FPv%	Count			
Party	Candidate	FPv%	1	2	3	4
Fianna Fáil	Jimmy Maloney*	20.65	1,430			
Fine Gael	John Flannery*	19.20	1,330	1,620		
Fianna Fáil	Gerry Murray	18.12	1,255	1,301	1,311	1,327
Fine Gael	Joseph Mellett	14.80	1,025	1,377	1,560	
Fianna Fáil	Paddy Oliver*	14.38	996	1,124	1,147	1,165
Fine Gael	Sean McEvoy*	12.85	890			
Electorate: 11,707 Valid: 6,926 (59.16%) Spoilt: 123 Quota: 1,386 Turnout: 7,049 (60.21%)

=== Westport ===
Westport - 4 seats
Party	Candidate	FPv%	Count		
Party	Candidate	FPv%	1	2	3
Fine Gael	Michael Ring TD*	35.56	2,694		
Fianna Fáil	Peter Sweeney	17.21	1,304	1,432	1,549
Fianna Fáil	Senator Frank Chambers*	18.12	1,171	1,278	1,445
Fianna Fáil	Margaret Adams	14.03	1,063	1,337	1,604
Fine Gael	Peter McManamon	8.65	655	1,073	1,277
Independent	Martin Keane	5.98	453	665	
Green	Ann Crowley	1.98	150	171	
Independent	Tom King	1.12	85	103	
Electorate: 11,248 Valid: 7,575 (67.35%) Spoilt: 93 Quota: 1,516 Turnout: 7,668 (68.17%)
