= 1985 Mayo County Council election =

Part of the 1985 Irish local elections

- 20 June 1985

All 31 seats on Mayo County Council
	First party	Second party	Third party
Party	Fianna Fáil	Fine Gael	Independent
Seats won	15	14	2
Seat change	0	-2	+2
- Map showing the area of Mayo County Council
Council control after election
TBD

An election to Mayo County Council took place on 20 June 1985 as part of the Irish local elections. 31 councillors were elected from six local electoral areas (LEAs) for a five-year term of office on the electoral system of proportional representation by means of the single transferable vote (PR-STV). This term was extended for a further year, to 1991.

== Results by party ==
Party	Seats	±	First Pref. votes	FPv%	±%
Fianna Fáil	15	0	31,615	52.61	
Fine Gael	14	-2	23,402	38.94	
Independent	2	+2	3,814	6.35	
Totals	31	0	60,097	100.00	—

== Results by local electoral area ==
=== Ballina ===
Ballina: 6 seats
Party	Candidate	FPv%	Count					
Party	Candidate	FPv%	1	2	3	4	5	6
Fianna Fáil	Sean Calleary TD*		2,240					
Fianna Fáil	Padraic Bourke*		1,605					
Fine Gael	Eddie Staunton*		1,386	1,450	1,740			
Fine Gael	Frank Devaney*		1,351	1,385	1,612			
Fianna Fáil	Stephen Molloy		1,192	1,328	1,348	1,355	1,374	1,393
Fine Gael	John Kelly*		1,089	1,144	1,387	1,568		
Fianna Fáil	Bridie Greavey*		1,046	1,366	1,416	1,423	1,466	1,518
Fine Gael	Ernie Caffrey		827	924				
Electorate: 15,882 Valid: 10,736 (68.01%) Spoilt: 65 Quota: 1,534 Turnout: 10,801

=== Castlebar ===
Castlebar: 5 seats
Party	Candidate	FPv%	Count							
Party	Candidate	FPv%	1	2	3	4	5	6	7	8
Independent	Frank Durcan*		2,053							
Fianna Fáil	Padraig Flynn TD*		1,790							
Fine Gael	Enda Kenny TD*		1,480	1,563	1,574	1,594	1,753			
Fine Gael	Paddy Burke*		1,242	1,276	1,286	1,345	1,382	1,384	1,897	
Fianna Fáil	Richard Morrin*		991	1,045	1,066	1,103	1,212	1,239	1,284	1,490
Fianna Fáil	Kevin O'Toole		863	869	870	938	955	957	969	1,330
Fine Gael	Henry Kenny		640	687	694	699	745	748		
Fianna Fáil	Al McDonnell		598	606	611	737	750	756	769	
Labour	Johnny Mee		389	439	491	510				
Fianna Fáil	David Kelly		338	350	351					
Labour	Michael Kilcoyne		112	121						
Electorate: 14,250 Valid: 10,496 (74.21%) Spoilt: 79 Quota: 1,750 Turnout: 10,575

=== Claremorris ===
Claremorris: 7 seats
Party	Candidate	FPv%	Count								
Party	Candidate	FPv%	1	2	3	4	5	6	7	8	9
Fianna Fáil	P.J. Morley TD*		1,783								
Independent	Martin Finn*		1,725	1,765							
Fine Gael	Jim Higgins TD*		1,717	1,799							
Fine Gael	Michael Raftery*		1,423	1,428	1,428	1,428	1,428	1,440	1,444	1,496	1,604
Fianna Fáil	Jack Heneghan*		1,406	1,413	1,413	1,415	1,415	1,421	1,448	1,641	1,667
Fianna Fáil	Sean Fitzpatrick*		1,074	1,081	1,083	1,097	1,100	1,184	1,509	1,745	
Fianna Fáil	Pat McHugh		962	1,012	1,020	1,033	1,049	1,073	1,125	1,257	1,319
Fine Gael	Jim Mannion		892	949	967	968	975	1,132	1,134	1,255	1,648
Fianna Fáil	Michael Mellett		749	753	755	760	761	777	814		
Fianna Fáil	Thomas Charlton		674	676	677	692	692	700			
Fine Gael	Madeline Maloney		636	648	660	662	663	850	1,006	1,025	
Fine Gael	Pa Connolly		467	521	547	548	551				
Fine Gael	Edward T. Griffith		294								
Fine Gael	Patrick Griffith		36								
Electorate: 18,829 Valid: 13,838 (69.41%) Spoilt: 107 Quota: 1,730 Turnout: 13,945

=== Killala ===
Killala: 4 seats
Party	Candidate	FPv%	Count		
Party	Candidate	FPv%	1	2	3
Fianna Fáil	Tim Quinn*		1,490		
Fianna Fáil	Padraig Cosgrove		1,269	1,453	
Fine Gael	John Noel Carey*		1,182	1,671	
Fianna Fáil	David O'Connor*		1,085	1,103	1,111
Fine Gael	Vinnie Munnelly*		982	1,055	1,349
Fine Gael	Patrick Lavelle		834		
Electorate: 9,434 Valid: 6,842 (73.22%) Spoilt: 66 Quota: 1,369 Turnout: 6,908

=== Swinford ===
Swinford: 4 seats
Party	Candidate	FPv%	Count				
Party	Candidate	FPv%	1	2	3	4	5
Fianna Fáil	Padraig Gavin*		1,967				
Fianna Fáil	Patsy Dunne*		1,289	1,486			
Fine Gael	John Flannery*		1,153	1,176	1,221	1,394	1,399
Fianna Fáil	Oliver Flannery		1,019	1,153	1,319	1,389	1,390
Fine Gael	Sean McEvoy*		910	972	1,023	1,491	
Fine Gael	John McNicholas		698	750	789		
Sinn Féin	Joe McHale		388	402			
Electorate: 10,977 Valid: 7,424 (65.23%) Spoilt: 104 Quota: 1,485 Turnout: 7,528

=== Westport ===
Westport: 5 seats
Party	Candidate	FPv%	Count					
Party	Candidate	FPv%	1	2	3	4	5	6
Fianna Fáil	Sen. Martin J. O'Toole*		2,191					
Fianna Fáil	Frank Chambers*		1,538	1,637	1,663	1,731	1,816	
Fine Gael	Patrick Durcan		1,492	1,540	1,679	1,740	2,367	
Fine Gael	Pat Kilbane*		1,407	1,411	1,424	1,425	1,564	1,896
Fianna Fáil	Pat Conway*		1,309	1,325	1,327	1,444	1,460	1,465
Fianna Fáil	Seamus Hughes		1,124	1,261	1,304	1,399	1,551	1,642
Fine Gael	Ted McHale*		1,011	1,044	1,127	1,148		
Sinn Féin	Mary McGing		377	392	407			
Fine Gael	John Morahan		285	357				
Electorate: 13,881 Valid: 10,761 (78.28%) Spoilt: 105 Quota: 1,794 Turnout: 10,866
