= 2019 Mayo County Council election =

Part of the 2019 Irish local elections

← 2014	24 May 2019	2024 →

All 30 seats on Mayo County Council 16 seats needed for a majority
	First party	Second party	Third party
Party	Fine Gael	Fianna Fáil	Sinn Féin
Seats won	12	11	1
Seat change	▲2	▲1	▼2
	Fourth party
Party	Independent
Seats won	6
Seat change	▼1
- Results by local electoral area
Council control before election
- Fianna Fáil
- Independent
Council control after election
- Fine Gael
- Independent

An election to all 30 seats on Mayo County Council was held on 24 May 2019 as part of the 2019 Irish local elections. County Mayo was divided into 6 local electoral areas (LEAs) to elect councillors for a five-year term of office on the electoral system of proportional representation by means of the single transferable vote (PR-STV).

== Boundary review ==
Following the recommendations of the 2018 LEA boundary review committee, there were significant alterations to the LEAs used at the 2014 Mayo County Council election. Its terms of reference set a maximum LEA size of 7 seats, breached by two of the 2014 LEAs. Other changes reflected population shifts revealed by the 2016 census.

== Results by party ==
Party	Seats	±	1st pref	FPv%	±%
Fine Gael	12	▲2	23,420	37.25	▲2.76
Fianna Fáil	11	▲1	18,823	29.93	▲0.65
Sinn Féin	1	▼2	4,633	7.37	▼2.96
Aontú	0	Steady	1,319	2.10	New
Green	0	Steady	628	1.00	▲0.62
People Before Profit	0	Steady	437	0.69	New
Renua	0	Steady	315	0.50	New
Social Democrats	0	Steady	185	0.29	New
Labour	0	Steady	143	0.23	▼0.74
Independent	6	▼1	12,976	20.64	▼3.92
Total	30	Steady	62,880	100.00	

== Results by local electoral area ==
*: Outgoing councillor elected in 2014.
†: Outgoing councillor coopted subsequent to the 2014 election.

=== Ballina ===
Ballina: 6 seats
Party	Candidate	FPv%	Count							
Party	Candidate	FPv%	1	2	3	4	5	6	7	8
Fine Gael	John O'Hara	17.30%	2,123							
Independent	Mark Duffy	17.08%	2,095							
Fianna Fáil	Annie May Reape	11.11%	1,363	1,498	1,576	1,599	1,628	1,747	1,772	
Fianna Fáil	Michael Loftus	10.76%	1,320	1,334	1,353	1,356	1,371	1,402	1,655	1,774
Independent	Seamus Weir	9.53%	1,169	1,220	1,256	1,278	1,321	1,428	1,469	1,646
Fianna Fáil	Eamon Moore	9.01%	1,105	1,116	1,126	1,135	1,161	1,170	1,327	1,436
Fine Gael	Jarlath Munnelly	7.76%	952	992	1,014	1,035	1,072	1,095	1,186	1,510
Fine Gael	Kieran Gill	5.85%	718	745	757	763	767	776		
Fine Gael	Aileen Horkan	4.66%	572	638	720	771	783	895	1,042	
Independent	Willie Nolan	3.16%	388	400	448	471	512			
Sinn Féin	Michael Regan	2.27%	279	286	298	319				
Social Democrats	Tracey Smith	1.51%	185	192	215					
Electorate: 20,353 Valid: 12,269 Spoilt: 185 Quota: 1,753 Turnout: 12,454 (61.19%)

=== Belmullet ===
Belmullet: 3 seats
Party	Candidate	FPv%	Count	
Party	Candidate	FPv%	1	2
Fine Gael	Gerry Coyle	25.52%	1,806	
Fianna Fáil	Paul McNamara	23.96%	1,696	2,095
Fianna Fáil	Seán Carey	22.66%	1,604	1,753
Sinn Féin	Teresa Whelan	15.43%	1,092	1,227
Fine Gael	Breege Grealis	9.26%	655	
Independent	Jay Heneghan	3.17%	224	
Electorate: 11,279 Valid: 7,077 Spoilt: 123 Quota: 1,770 Turnout: 7,200 (63.84%)

=== Castlebar ===
Castlebar: 7 seats
Party	Candidate	FPv%	Count												
Party	Candidate	FPv%	1	2	3	4	5	6	7	8	9	10	11	12	13
Independent	Michael Kilcoyne	18.72%	2,592												
Fianna Fáil	Blackie K. Gavin	12.85%	1,779												
Fianna Fáil	Al McDonnell	10.97%	1,519	1,658	1,661	1,671	1,679	1,697	1,710	1,748					
Fine Gael	Ger Deere	9.23%	1,278	1,387	1,396	1,402	1,412	1,426	1,464	1,492	1,535	1,571	1,653	1,915	
Fine Gael	Cyril Burke	8.61%	1,192	1,258	1,259	1,262	1,270	1,276	1,288	1,303	1,314	1,334	1,395	1,523	1,609
Fianna Fáil	Martin McLoughlin	6.62%	916	985	990	998	1,000	1,013	1,027	1,042	1,061	1,138	1,236	1,378	1,396
Fine Gael	Donna Sheridan	5.81%	804	879	880	884	904	928	948	960	1,031	1,103	1,198	1,400	1,450
Fine Gael	Eugene McCormack	5.24%	725	783	786	789	796	802	819	840	869	956	990		
Independent	Harry Barrett	4.48%	620	733	740	745	775	795	839	874	1,000	1,055	1,189	1,273	1,303
Sinn Féin	Joe McHale	4.35%	602	665	671	673	678	687	698	725	793	888			
Independent	Gerry Loftus	3.99%	552	587	593	595	601	611	618	643	668				
People Before Profit	Joe Daly	3.16%	437	482	487	488	505	520	530	545					
Renua	Michael Farrington	2.27%	315	333	334	335	340	342	350						
Independent	Aidan Crowley	1.27%	176	207	208	209	215	221							
Labour	Kamal Uddin	1.03%	143	157	159	160									
Independent	Des Walsh	1.03%	142	156	164	165	170								
Independent	Anthony Vesey	0.39%	54	66											
Electorate: 23,682 Valid: 13,847 Spoilt: 172 Quota: 1,731 Turnout: 14,019 (59.2%)

=== Claremorris ===
Claremorris: 6 seats
Party	Candidate	FPv%	Count					
Party	Candidate	FPv%	1	2	3	4	5	6
Fine Gael	Patsy O'Brien (Note: See change below.)	22.64%	2,955					
Independent	Richard Finn	13.59%	1,774	1,885				
Fianna Fáil	Damien Ryan	12.04%	1,572	1,898				
Fine Gael	John Cribbin	11.47%	1,497	1,536	1,553	1,694	1,696	1,785
Fine Gael	Michael Burke	10.83%	1,413	1,722	1,765	1,800	1,821	1,907
Fine Gael	Tom Connolly	9.24%	1,206	1,314	1,333	1,417	1,419	1,769
Fianna Fáil	Michael Carty	7.14%	932	963	970	1,120	1,123	1,286
Sinn Féin	Natasha Warde	5.85%	764	866	964	1,079	1,084	
Aontú	Paul Lawless	5.19%	677	710	748			
Green	Margaret (Mags) Sheehan	2.01%	263	294				
Electorate: 21,103 Valid: 13,053 Spoilt: 165 Quota: 1,865 Turnout: 13,218 (62.64%)

=== Swinford ===
Swinford: 4 seats
Party	Candidate	FPv%	Count		
Party	Candidate	FPv%	1	2	3
Sinn Féin	Gerry Murray	23.21%	1,896		
Fianna Fáil	Michael Smyth	19.97%	1,631	1,677	
Fine Gael	Neil Cruise	18.50%	1,511	1,525	1,614
Fianna Fáil	John Caulfield	15.87%	1,296	1,370	1,635
Fine Gael	Tom Lavin	13.83%	1,130	1,188	1,337
Aontú	Tommy Horan	7.86%	642	699	
Independent	Sean Forkin	0.76%	62	75	
Electorate: 14,276 Valid: 8,168 Spoilt: 129 Quota: 1,634 Turnout: 8,297 (58.92%)

=== Westport ===
Westport: 4 seats
Party	Candidate	FPv%	Count						
Party	Candidate	FPv%	1	2	3	4	5	6	7
Independent	Christy Hyland	17.03%	1,442	1,475	1,515	1,587	1,711		
Fine Gael	Peter Flynn	14.76%	1,250	1,274	1,347	1,407	1,519	2,015	
Fianna Fáil	Brendan Mulroy	14.07%	1,191	1,203	1,230	1,376	1,403	1,572	1,686
Independent	John (Johno) O'Malley	11.33%	959	983	1,015	1,153	1,238	1,388	1,520
Fianna Fáil	Chris Maxwell	10.62%	899	918	931	957	1,319	1,396	1,452
Fine Gael	Austin Francis O'Malley	9.80%	830	855	873	888			
Fine Gael	Teresa McGuire	9.48%	803	816	875	927	1,036		
Independent	Darragh McGee	6.26%	530	546	589				
Green	Cissy Nayiga	4.31%	365	376					
Independent	Shane Fitzgerald	1.36%	115						
Independent	Frank McAlonan	0.97%	82						
Electorate: 13,589 Valid: 8,466 Spoilt: 137 Quota: 1,694 Turnout: 8,603 (63.31%)

== Results by gender ==
2019 Mayo County Council election Candidates by gender
Gender	Number of candidates	% of candidates	Elected councillors	% of councillors
Men	53	84.1%	28	93.3%
Women	10	15.9%	2	6.7%
TOTAL	63		30	

== Changes after 2019 ==
Name	LEA	Elected as	New affiliation	Date
Patsy O'Brien	Claremorris	Fine Gael	Independent	October 2020
