= 2009 Mayo County Council election =

Part of the 2009 Irish local elections

← 2004	5 June 2009	2014 →

31 seats on Mayo County Council
	First party	Second party	Third party
Party	Fine Gael	Fianna Fáil	Sinn Féin
Seats won	17	7	2
Seat change	+2	-5	+1
	Fourth party	Fifth party
Party	Independent	Labour
Seats won	5	0
Seat change	+3	-1
- Map showing the area of Mayo County Council
Council control after election
Fine Gael

An election to Mayo County Council took place on 5 June 2009 as part of that year's Irish local elections. 31 councillors were elected from six local electoral areas (LEAs) for a five-year term of office on the electoral system of proportional representation by means of the single transferable vote (PR-STV).

== Results by party ==
Party	Seats	±	First Pref. votes	FPv%	±%
Fine Gael	17	+2	30,236	44.41	
Fianna Fáil	7	-5	20,194	29.66	
Sinn Féin	2	+1	4,906	7.21	
Independent	5	+3	10,663	15.66	
Labour	0	-1	2,092	3.07	
Totals	31	-	68,091	100.00	—

== Results by local electoral area ==
=== Ballina ===
Ballina - 6 seats
Party	Candidate	FPv%	Count						
Party	Candidate	FPv%	1	2	3	4	5	6	7
Fine Gael	Michelle Mulherin*	15.86	1,921						
Fianna Fáil	Annie Mae Reape*	13.37	1,619	1,643	1,699	1,700	2,190		
Fine Gael	Jarlath Munnelly*	12.56	1,521	1,574	1,725	1,732			
Fine Gael	Eddie Staunton*	12.37	1,498	1,518	1,761				
Fine Gael	Seamus Weir*	11.76	1,424	1,455	1,538	1,544	1,688	1,778	
Independent	Gerry Ginty	9.44	1,143	1,162	1,308	1,310	1,481	1,557	1,578
Fianna Fáil	Michael Loftus	8.33	1,009	1,012	1,182	1,195	1,344	1,533	1,559
Fianna Fáil	Johnnie O'Malley*	8.28	1,003	1,026	1,079	1,080			
Labour	David Moffatt	5.99	725	739					
Independent	Bernard Flynn	2.06	249	252					
Electorate: 19,066 Valid: 12,112 (63.53%) Spoilt: 146 Quota: 1,731 Turnout: 12,258 (64.29%)

=== Belmullet ===
Belmullet - 4 seats
Party	Candidate	FPv%	Count					
Party	Candidate	FPv%	1	2	3	4	5	6
Fianna Fáil	Michael McNamara*	16.60	1,503	1,575	1,889			
Independent	Michael Holmes*	15.59	1,412	1,493	1,668	1,711	1,847	
Fine Gael	Gerry Coyle*	15.29	1,385	1,408	1,638	1,649	2,202	
Sinn Féin	Rose Conway-Walsh	15.11	1,368	1,465	1,519	1,534	1,727	1,852
Fianna Fáil	Tim Quinn*	12.48	1,130	1,164	1,166	1,169	1,307	1,417
Fine Gael	Ian McAndrews	10.62	962	982	1,110	1,115		
Fine Gael	Pat Kilbane	9.99	905	947				
Independent	John Corrigan	2.37	215					
Independent	James Padden	1.94	176					
Electorate: 13,694 Valid: 9,056 (66.13%) Spoilt: 121 Quota: 1,812 Turnout: 9,177 (67.01%)

=== Castlebar ===
Castlebar - 7 seats
Party	Candidate	FPv%	Count										
Party	Candidate	FPv%	1	2	3	4	5	6	7	8	9	10	11
Independent	Michael Kilcoyne	15.65	2,330										
Fine Gael	Henry Kenny*	12.97	1,927										
Fianna Fáil	Al McDonnell*	11.81	1,753	1,802	1,805	1,890							
Fine Gael	Cyril Burke*	11.77	1,746	1,793	1,810	1,835	1,836	1,988					
Independent	Frank Durcan	10.60	1,574	1,667	1,673	1,745	1,747	1,802	1,812	2,007			
Fine Gael	Eugene McCormack	7.30	1,084	1,135	1,159	1,210	1,213	1,460	1,543	1,785	1,840	2,023	
Sinn Féin	Thérése Ruane	6.07	902	958	961	998	1,002	1,050	1,053	1,219	1,255	1,383	1,426
Fianna Fáil	K. Blackie Gavin	5.41	804	836	839	921	931	998	1,006	1,078	1,099	1,526	1,570
Labour	Harry Barrett	5.15	765	806	809	857	858	923	942				
Fianna Fáil	Michael Feeney	4.96	737	761	763	902	914	952	955	1,018	1,032		
Fine Gael	Kevin Guthrie	4.34	645	685	695	724	726						
Fianna Fáil	Aidan Crowley	3.96	588	607	608								
Electorate: 23,279 Valid: 14,848 (63.78%) Spoilt: 163 Quota: 1,857 Turnout: 15,011 (64.48%)

=== Claremorris ===
Claremorris - 6 seats
Party	Candidate	FPv%	Count				
Party	Candidate	FPv%	1	2	3	4	5
Fine Gael	Patsy O'Brien*	18.67	2,760				
Fine Gael	John Cribbin*	13.40	1,981	2,010	2,030	2,141	
Independent	Richard Finn	12.29	1,817	1,863	2,028	2,219	
Fine Gael	Tom Connolly*	10.14	1,499	1,590	1,718	1,911	2,021
Fine Gael	Michael Burke	9.44	1,396	1,573	1,584	1,609	1,999
Fianna Fáil	Damien Ryan*	9.30	1,375	1,474	1,515	1,648	2,118
Fianna Fáil	Michael Carty*	8.56	1,265	1,274	1,373	1,734	1,766
Independent	Harry Walsh*	7.41	1,095	1,247	1,265	1,294	
Fianna Fáil	Patrick McHugh*	6.26	925	950	1,107		
Fianna Fáil	Gerard McHale	4.55	672	691			
Electorate: 21,780 Valid: 14,785 (67.88%) Spoilt: 164 Quota: 2,113 Turnout: 14,949 (68.64%)

=== Swinford ===
Swinford - 4 seats
Party	Candidate	FPv%	Count			
Party	Candidate	FPv%	1	2	3	4
Sinn Féin	Gerry Murray*	24.60	2,218			
Fianna Fáil	Jimmy Maloney*	15.95	1,438	1,461	1,526	1,771
Fine Gael	Eugene Lavin*	14.11	1,272	1,311	1,582	1,847
Fine Gael	Joseph Mellett*	12.85	1,159	1,209	1,436	1,804
Fianna Fáil	Michael Smyth	12.77	1,152	1,220	1,285	1,508
Fianna Fáil	John Caulfield	10.40	938	1,038	1,173	
Fine Gael	Cahal Henry	5.19	468	544		
Independent	Sylvia Spain	2.20	198	221		
Independent	John Healy	1.94	175	210		
Electorate: 13,732 Valid: 9,018 (65.67%) Spoilt: 159 Quota: 1,804 Turnout: 9,177 (66.83%)

=== Westport ===
Westport - 4 seats
Party	Candidate	FPv%	Count					
Party	Candidate	FPv%	1	2	3	4	5	6
Fine Gael	Peter Flynn*	20.50	1,694					
Fine Gael	John O'Malley*	20.39	1,685					
Fianna Fáil	Margaret Adams*	19.52	1,613	1,620	1,648	1,655		
Fine Gael	Austin O'Malley*	15.78	1,304	1,321	1,367	1,384	1,465	1,830
Fianna Fáil	Caroline Navin O'Malley	8.11	670	672	683	685	744	
Labour	Keith Martin	7.28	602	611	712	715	912	976
Sinn Féin	Dave Keating	5.06	418	421	471	473		
Independent	Andy Wilson	2.55	211	212				
Independent	Tom King	0.82	68	69				
Electorate: 12,420 Valid: 8,265 (66.55%) Spoilt: 91 Quota: 1,654 Turnout: 8,356 (67.28%)
