= 1991 Mayo County Council election =

Part of the 1991 Irish local elections

- 27 June 1991

All 31 seats on Mayo County Council
	First party	Second party	Third party
Party	Fianna Fáil	Fine Gael	Labour
Seats won	15	13	1
Seat change	0	-1	+1
	Fourth party
Party	Independent
Seats won	2
Seat change	0
- Map showing the area of Mayo County Council
Council control after election
TBD

An election to Mayo County Council took place on 27 June 1991 as part of that year's Irish local elections. 31 councillors were elected from seven local electoral areas (LEAs) for a five-year term of office on the electoral system of proportional representation by means of the single transferable vote (PR-STV). This term was extended twice, first to 1998, then to 1999.

== Results by party ==
Party	Seats	±	First Pref. votes	FPv%	±%
Fianna Fáil	15	0	25,672	47.29	
Fine Gael	13	-1	21,656	39.89	
Labour	1	+1	1,949	3.59	
Independent	2	0	3,484	6.42	
Sinn Féin	0	0	860	0.59	
Green	0	0	336	0.59	
Totals	31	0	54,292	100.00	—

== Results by local electoral area ==
=== Ballina ===
Ballina - 6 seats
Party	Candidate	FPv%	Count						
Party	Candidate	FPv%	1	2	3	4	5	6	7
Fianna Fáil	Annie Mae Reape	15.6%	1,578						
Fine Gael	Ernie Caffrey	12.7%	1,284	1,346	1,376	1,504			
Fianna Fáil	Padraic Bourke*	12.3%	1,244	1,267	1,314	1,371	1,571		
Fianna Fáil	Stephen Molloy	11.9%	1,200	1,206	1,218	1,238	1,253	1,275	1,290
Fine Gael	Frank Devaney*	11.5%	1,160	1,169	1,172	1,216	1,414	1,459	
Fine Gael	Eddie Staunton*	11.2%	1,132	1,148	1,153	1,230	1,530		
Fianna Fáil	Jimmy Glacken*	8.5%	857	879	903	1,125	1,162	1,189	1,200
Fine Gael	Paddy Naughten	7.9%	801	813	819	873			
Independent	Tony Durkan	6.2%	630	687	694				
Labour	Dick Melrose	2.2%	221						
Electorate: 15,551 Valid: 10,107 (64.99%) Spoilt: 162 Quota: 1,444 Turnout: 10,188 (65.51%)

=== Castlebar ===
Castlebar - 5 seats
Party	Candidate	FPv%	Count					
Party	Candidate	FPv%	1	2	3	4	5	6
Fianna Fáil	Al McDonnell*	19.7%	1,851					
Fine Gael	Enda Kenny TD*	14.1%	1,327	1,343	1,497	1,628		
Fianna Fáil	Richard Morrin*	12.08	1,204	1,284	1,362	1,565		
Fine Gael	Paddy Burke*	11.1%	1,047	1,097	1,178	1,236	1,646	
Labour	Johnny Mee	10.6%	999	1,006	1,161	1,210	1,441	1,508
Fianna Fáil	George O'Malley	8.9%	834	886	920	1,146	1,233	1,246
Fine Gael	Liam Coady	8.6%	806	813	873	886		
Fine Gael	Regina Mulrooney	7.6%	713	772	797			
Progressive Democrats	Kevin Bourke	6.5%	613	627				
Electorate: 14,146 Valid: 9,394 (66.41%) Spoilt: 77 Quota: 1,566 Turnout: 9,471 (66.95%)

=== Claremorris ===
Claremorris - 7 seats
Party	Candidate	FPv%	Count								
Party	Candidate	FPv%	1	2	3	4	5	6	7	8	9
Fine Gael	Jim Higgins TD*	14.8%	1,862								
Fianna Fáil	P.J. Morley TD*	12.1%	1,517	1,580							
Fianna Fáil	Patrick McHugh*	10.0%	1,254	1,260	1,271	1,292	1,370	1,801			
Fianna Fáil	Jack Heneghan*	9.6%	1,209	1,211	1,236	1,377	1,388	1,541	1,709		
Independent	Richard Finn	9.1%	1,141	1,179	1,239	1,291	1,504	1,726			
Fine Gael	Jim Mannion*	8.7%	1,095	1,122	1,156	1,243	1,482	1,557	1,599		
Fine Gael	Michael Raftery*	7.5%	942	946	970	1,205	1,237	1,244	1,248	1,252	1,257
Fianna Fáil	Sean Fitzpatrick*	7.3%	913	916	949	979	1,085				
Fine Gael	Tom Higgins	6.8%	860	946	962	975	1,102	1,138	1,149	1,174	1,188
Fine Gael	Ray Leonard	6.0%	761	812	862	891					
Progressive Democrats	Michael Ryan	12.5%	691	694	739						
Labour	John Murphy	12.5%	297	300							
Independent	Michael Robinson	0.3%	44	46							
Electorate: 18,132 Valid: 12,586 (69.41%) Spoilt: 80 Quota: 1,574 Turnout: 12,666 (69.85%)

=== Killala ===
Killala - 4 seats
Party	Candidate	FPv%	Count					
Party	Candidate	FPv%	1	2	3	4	5	6
Independent	Padraig Cosgrove*	22.6%	1,350					
Fine Gael	Vinnie Munnelly*	17.4%	1,039	1,069	1,077	1,086	1,087	1,104
Fianna Fáil	Tim Quinn*	16.6%	994	1,041	1,309			
Fianna Fáil	Brian Golden	15.9%	949	963	1,005	1,019	1,127	1,139
Fine Gael	John Noel Carey*	15.8%	945	1,000	1,122	1,254		
Fianna Fáil	Michael Goonan	14.05	496	511				
Independent	Tony Mullarkey	2.8%	169					
Independent	Martin Tighe	0.5%	29					
Electorate: 9,176 Valid: 5,971 (65.07%) Spoilt: 73 Quota: 1,195 Turnout: 6,044 (65.87%)

=== Swinford ===
Swinford - 4 seats
Party	Candidate	FPv%	Count			
Party	Candidate	FPv%	1	2	3	4
Fianna Fáil	Jimmy Maloney	22.1%	1,423			
Fine Gael	John Flannery*	18.6%	1,200	1,211	1,215	1,383
Fianna Fáil	Paddy Oliver	15.7%	1,009	1,035	1,087	1,318
Fianna Fáil	Patsy Dunne*	14.9%	959	967	1,006	1,040
Fine Gael	Sean McEvoy*	14.0%	901	924	956	1,342
Fine Gael	Joseph Mellett	12.9%	830	861	868	
Independent	Tony McDonagh	1.9%	121			
Electorate: 9,877 Valid: 6,443 (65.23%) Spoilt: 62 Quota: 1,289 Turnout: 6,505 (65.86%)

=== Westport ===
Westport - 5 seats
Party	Candidate	FPv%	Count			
Party	Candidate	FPv%	1	2	3	4
Fine Gael	Michael Ring	21.1%	2,063			
Fianna Fáil	Martin J. O'Toole TD*	17.21	1,697			
Fine Gael	Pat Kilbane*	16.4%	1,601	1,774		
Fianna Fáil	Frank Chambers*	15.7%	1,538	1,564	1,584	1,662
Fianna Fáil	Seamus Hughes*	12.7%	1,244	1,364	1,410	1,576
Independent	Denis Gallagher	10.1%	989	1,007	1,035	1,130
Labour	Maurice Rice	4.4%	432	499	558	
Progressive Democrats	John Joe Kilcoyne	2.2%	227	254		
Electorate: 13,691 Valid: 9,791 (71.5%) Spoilt: 93 Quota: 1,632 Turnout: 9,899 (72.3%)
