= Letitia Dunbar-Harrison =

Irish librarian (1906–1994)

Letitia Dunbar-Harrison (4 February 1906 – 1994) was an Irish librarian who became the subject of a controversy over her appointment. A graduate of Trinity College Dublin, she is the subject of the 2009 book by Pat Walsh, The Curious Case of the Mayo Librarian, and a RTÉ documentary of the same name.

== Mayo county librarian controversy ==
In 1930, a vacancy for county librarian arose in County Mayo, the county with the smallest non-Catholic minority in Ireland. Dunbar-Harrison was recommended for the role by the Local Appointments Commission. The Library Committee of Mayo County Council, mostly consisting of prominent local Catholics as well as a bishop, refused to endorse the recommendation, claiming her grasp of Irish was inadequate. During the debate, it was asked "could a Protestant be trusted to hand out books to Catholics?".

The County Council did not sanction her nomination. In response, the government dissolved the County Council and replaced it with a Commissioner who appointed Dunbar-Harrison to the role of county librarian.

The government's stance was strongly opposed by some prominent Catholic clerics and politicians, including Opposition leader Éamon de Valera. Despite the government standing its ground on the appointment, a boycott of the library ensued which eventually resulted in W. T. Cosgrave, President of the Executive Council, and Catholic Archbishop of Tuam, Dr. Thomas Gilmartin, coming to an agreement to transfer Dunbar-Harrison from Mayo to a Department of Defence post in Dublin in January 1932.

== Debate about motives for non-appointment ==
The reason given by the County Council for not appointing her as librarian was her insufficient grasp of Irish:

A certain advertisement was issued by the Local Appointments Commissioners. I am speaking from recollection, as I have not the necessary data at hand, but I am sure that the Minister will be in a position to put me right. The advertisement stipulated that a competent knowledge of Irish was necessary for the position. The resolution refusing to appoint Miss Dunbar as librarian was passed first by the Library Committee. It dealt only with her knowledge of Irish. That resolution subsequently came before the County Council, and was ratified by that body. The resolution dealt with one question only, and that was that Miss Dunbar did not possess a competent knowledge of Irish.

— Michael Davis (Irish politician)

Éamon de Valera, leader of Fianna Fáil, said in the Dáil:

If I thought that the principle that the librarian in a Catholic community should be Catholic was a new principle, introduced merely to deny a Protestant an appointment, I would vote against it, but I know from my youth that it is not so ... I say that if I had a vote on a local body, and if there were two qualified people who had to deal with a Catholic community, and if one was a Catholic and the other a Protestant, I would unhesitatingly vote for the Catholic. Let us be clear and let us know where we are ... If this librarian were simply a sort of clerk, who attended to somebody who came in and handed out a book which that person asked for, then I would not have any hesitation in saying that it was not an educational position, and that there was no reason whatever for introducing religion in that case ... the people of Mayo, in a county where, I think—I forget the figures—over 98 per cent. of the population is Catholic, are justified in insisting upon a Catholic librarian.

J. J. Lee suggested that the resentment of local people towards the Local Appointments Commission for appointing someone with little or no local connections may also have been a factor, but argued that sectarianism was also involved:

Even local resentment at what was perceived as metropolitan intrusion was not the core of the problem. It was rather than Miss Dunbar-Harrison suffered from the dual stigma of being a Protestant and a graduate of Trinity College Dublin.

— J. J. Lee Ireland, 1912-1985: Politics and Society

He cited one J.T. Morahan who was:

opposed to the appointment of a product of Trinity to the position of Librarian in this County. Trinity culture is not the culture of the Gael; rather it is poison gas to the kindly Celtic people.

— J.T. Morahan Connaught Telegraph, 3 January 1931

Michael D. Higgins (elected as president of Ireland in 2011) also suggested that sectarianism was a factor:

I refer to the case of Miss Dunbar Harrison in Mayo who was appointed by the Local Appointments Commission as a librarian. When she had opted to work in Mayo she was told that 24 out of the 26 members of the library committee would not have her. She was a Protestant and a Trinity graduate. Later someone said that it would be all right if she was handing out books but that she might recommend a book to somebody and no less a person than Mr. de Valera suggested that Mayo people were entitled to have someone they wanted handing books out to children.

— Michael D. Higgins

Professor John A. Murphy argued that it was a case of local versus national government:

The Taoiseach drew up Mr. de Valera's attitude to the appointment of a librarian in County Mayo. It might be noted for the record that the reason why his political opposite number – I think it was General Mulcahy who was the appropriate Minister at that time – in Cumann na nGaedheal wanted to keep Miss Letitia Dunbar Harrison in office was not because he was somehow inflamed with non-sectarian zeal but because he did not like the action of the Mayo County Council in suspending her. It was a government versus local government dispute rather than anything else.

— Prof John A. Murphy Seanad Éireann Debate, 9 October 1981

The government resolved the situation by offering her a post in the Military Library in Dublin, which she accepted.

== Life after Mayo controversy ==
She had met a Methodist minister, Reverend Robert Crawford, while in Castlebar. They married a few months after she started work in the Military Library, and she then became known as Aileen Crawford. Because of the marriage bar she had to resign her post.

The couple lived in Waterford, Tipperary, Louth and Antrim and had no children. After being widowed in the 1950s, she remained in Northern Ireland.

She attempted to become a Methodist minister, but was failed on one of her written exams for the post. She remained an active member of her church for many years and died in 1994.

== Bibliography ==
- Enda Delaney, Demography, State and Society: Irish Migration to Britain, 1921-1971. Liverpool University Press, 2000. ISBN 0-85323-745-X
