= 2014 Mayo County Council election =

Part of the 2014 Irish local elections

- 23 May 2014

All 30 seats on Mayo County Council 16 seats needed for a majority
	First party	Second party	Third party
Party	Fianna Fáil	Fine Gael	Sinn Féin
Seats won	10	10	3
Seat change	▲3	▼7	▲1
	Fourth party
Party	Independent
Seats won	7
Seat change	▲2
- Map showing the area of Mayo County Council
Council control after election
- Fianna Fáil
- Independent

An election to all 30 seats on Mayo County Council was held in Ireland on 23 May 2014 as part of the 2014 Irish local elections, a decrease from 31 seats at the 2009 election. County Mayo was divided into four local electoral areas (LEAs) to elect councillors for a five-year term of office on the electoral system of proportional representation by means of the single transferable vote (PR-STV).

While Fine Gael remained the most popular party in Mayo in terms of vote share, the party surrendered its previously held overall majority on Mayo County Council and lost 7 seats in the process to be reduced to 10 councillors. Several long-serving members lost their seats in the process and the Taoiseach's brother, Henry Kenny, was a near casualty in Castlebar. Fianna Fáil gained 3 seats in the election to return with 10 councillors, the same numbers as Fine Gael. Their gains came in Ballina, Castlebar, and Claremorris. The party missed out on an additional seat in West Mayo due to running too many candidates, transfer leakage, and the fact that the previous incumbents had retired. Sinn Féin made modest gains by gaining a seat in Castlebar to add to their delegation, although the party was very close in Ballina. Independents garnered a large vote share in each LEA and increased their numbers to 7 seats.

== Results by party ==
Party	Seats	±	1st pref	FPv%
Fine Gael	10	−7	21,535	34.48
Fianna Fáil	10	+3	18,287	29.28
Independent	7	+2	15,336	24.56
Sinn Féin	3	+1	6,447	10.32
Labour	0	0	607	0.97
Green	0		239	0.38
Total	30	−1	62,453	100.00

== Results by local electoral area ==
*: Outgoing councillor.

=== Ballina ===
Ballina: 8 seats
Party	Candidate	FPv%	Count												
Party	Candidate	FPv%	1	2	3	4	5	6	7	8	9	10	11	12	13
Fine Gael	John O'Hara	9.9%	1,612	1,614	1,672	1,712	1,741	1,746	1,846						
Independent	Seamus Weir	9.7%	1,589	1,590	1,630	1,670	1,672	1,762	1,812	1,817					
Fianna Fáil	Annie May Raepe	7.7%	1,256	1,260	1,263	1,314	1,330	1,392	1,652	1,662	1,822				
Fianna Fáil	Michael Smyth	6.6%	1,069	1,087	1,091	1,093	1,297	1,410	1,416	1,416	1,434	1,450	1,480	1,521	1,523
Fine Gael	Jarlath Munnelly	6.4%	1,042	1,043	1,122	1,127	1,160	1,166	1,196	1,199	1,565	1,834			
Fianna Fáil	Michael Loftus	6.4%	1,037	1,037	1,098	1,105	1,109	1,137	1,186	1,187	1,372	1,432	2,100		
Sinn Féin	John Sheahan	6.3%	1,026	1,059	1,062	1,096	1,218	1,266	1,278	1,278	1,314	1,355	1,393	1,440	1,453
Independent	Enda Lavelle	6.0%	980	983	1,062	1,071	1,075	1,081	1,088	1,090	1,190	1,244			
Independent	Gerry Ginty	5.7%	935	938	948	1,155	1,159	1,169	1,290	1,295	1,340	1,736	1,846		
Fianna Fáil	Eamon Moore	5.5%	901	901	987	999	1,001	1,018	1,043	1,043					
Fine Gael	Neil Cruise	5.2%	848	854	871	882	1,004	1,253	1,253	1,258	1,274	1,344	1,406	1,500	1,510
Fine Gael	Mark Winters	5.1%	830	830	858	909	914	919	1,081	1,088	1,111				
Fianna Fáil	Johnnie O'Malley	4.9%	798	693	799	808	849	851	872						
Fianna Fáil	Jimmy Maloney	4.2%	682	685	687	688	709								
Fine Gael	Joe Mellet	3.6%	585	609	611	613									
Independent	Peter Clarke	5.2%	528	528	530										
Fine Gael	Padraic Staunton	2.9%	486	486											
Independent	Martin Peyton	0.7%	111												
Electorate: 26,103 Valid: 16,315 Spoilt: 167 Quota: 1,813 Turnout: 16,482 (63.1%)

=== Castlebar ===
Castlebar: 8 seats
Party	Candidate	FPv%	Count							
Party	Candidate	FPv%	1	2	3	4	5	6	7	8
Independent	Michael Kilcoyne	18.9%	2,922							
Fianna Fáil	Lisa Chambers	9.6%	1,481	1,610	1,621	1,644	1,681	1,826		
Fianna Fáil	Al McDonnell	9.2%	1,419	1,531	1,534	1,549	1,578	1,597	1,606	1,682
Sinn Féin	Thérèse Ruane	8.9%	1,375	1,517	1,539	1,581	1,607	1,719		
Fine Gael	Cyril Burke	7.7%	1,185	1,231	1,234	1,242	1,296	1,347	1,355	1,641
Fianna Fáil	K. Blackie Gavin	7.3%	1,127	1,263	1,265	1,293	1,341	1,415	1,438	1,539
Independent	Frank Durcan	7.1%	1,100	1,345	1,366	1,419	1,464	1,562	1,585	1,664
Fine Gael	Eugene Lavin	7.0%	1,083	1,106	1,108	1,112	1,163	1,181	1,186	
Fine Gael	Henry Kenny	7.0%	1,075	1,150	1,152	1,168	1,384	1,435	1,441	1,674
Fine Gael	Brendan Henaghan	6.1%	934	1,026	1,036	1,080	1,266	1,383	1,410	1,522
Fine Gael	Eugene McCormack	4.5%	690	736	739	754				
Labour	Harry Barrett	3.9%	606	712	721	759	793			
Independent	Donal Geraghty	1.7%	265	307	324					
Independent	Mohammed Kamal Uddin	0.9%	132	146						
Electorate: 26,263 Valid: 15,397 (58.6%) Spoilt: 135 Quota: 1,806 Turnout: 15,532 (59.1%)

=== Claremorris ===
Claremorris: 7 seats
Party	Candidate	FPv%	Count					
Party	Candidate	FPv%	1	2	3	4	5	6
Fine Gael	Patsy O'Brien	15.1%	2,347					
Independent	Richard Finn	13.2%	2,050					
Sinn Féin	Gerry Murray	12.7%	1,971					
Fine Gael	John Cribben	11.3%	1,750	1,770	1,843	1,862	1,879	1,926
Fianna Fáil	John Caulfield	9.8%	1,518	1,523	1,565	1,576	1,585	1,771
Fianna Fáil	Damien Ryan	7.3%	1,250	1,319	1,336	1,339	1,697	1,913
Fine Gael	Tom Connolly	7.1%	1,203	1,263	1,331	1,369	1,396	1,823
Fine Gael	Michael Burke	7.2%	1,120	1,218	1,255	1,258	1,524	1,559
Fianna Fáil	John P. Kean	6.4%	1,001	1,048	1,142	1,170	1,209	
Independent	Harry Walsh	5.3%	826	911	977	982		
Independent	Marie Kilcullen	2.6%	403	418				
Green	Margaret (Mags) Sheehan	0.7%	103	108				
Electorate: 25,099 Valid: 15,542 (61.9%) Spoilt: 177 Quota: 1,943 Turnout: 15,719 (62.6%)

=== West Mayo ===
West Mayo: 7 seats
Party	Candidate	FPv%	Count											
Party	Candidate	FPv%	1	2	3	4	5	6	7	8	9	10	11	12
Sinn Féin	Rose Conway-Walsh	13.7%	2,075											
Independent	Michael Holmes	10.9%	1,667	1,701	1,714	1,747	1,867	1,919						
Fianna Fáil	Paul McNamara	8.9%	1,351	1,356	1,359	1,363	1,370	1,373	1,547	1,576	1,662	1,675	1,698	1,701
Fine Gael	Tereasa McGuire	6.4%	1,200	1,203	1,229	1,236	1,254	1,291	1,350	1,428	1,436	1,700	2,136	
Fianna Fáil	Seán Carey	7.9%	1,197	1,250	1,251	1,254	1,255	1,257	1,264	1,299	1,508	1,515	1,530	1,533
Fine Gael	Gerry Coyle	7.9%	1,194	1,223	1,225	1,226	1,230	1,232	1,326	1,329	1,505	1,526	1,606	1,729
Independent	Christy Hyland	7.6%	1,160	1,167	1,186	1,210	1,232	1,281	1,295	1,370	1,378	1,580	1,892	1,979
Fine Gael	Austin O'Malley	6.6%	1,004	1,006	1,010	1,101	1,114	1,128	1,141	1,184	1,185	1,406		
Fianna Fáil	Brendan Mulroy	5.5%	913	916	923	943	980	1,045	1,073	1,278	1,298	1,468	1,618	1,638
Fine Gael	John O'Malley	5.5%	836	838	846	851	885	933	968	1,011	1,019			
Fianna Fáil	Frank Leneghan	4.6%	544	558	558	559	566	568	618	630				
Fine Gael	Breege Grealis	3.4%	511	517	525	525	540	545						
Fianna Fáil	Joan Geraghty	3.2%	486	489	546	558	585	592					→	
Independent	Joe Lavelle	2.2%	337	340	354	357	374							
Independent	Michael O'Donnell	2.2%	331	336	346									
Fianna Fáil	Tommie Joe Jennings	1.7%	257	258	260									
Green	Caroline Fitzgerald	0.9%	136	141										
Electorate: 24,947 Valid: 15,199 Spoilt: 152 Quota: 1,900 Turnout: 15,351 (61.53%)

== Changes ==
=== Co-options ===
Party	Outgoing	LEA	Reason	Date	Co-optee
Fianna Fáil	Lisa Chambers	Castlebar	Elected to the 32nd Dáil at the 2016 general election.	14 March 2016	Michael McLoughlin
Sinn Féin	Rose Conway-Walsh	West Mayo	Elected to 25th Seanad at the 2016 Seanad election.	22 July 2016	Teresa Whelan
Sinn Féin	Therese Ruane	Castlebar	Resigned due to work commitments.	2 March 2018	Joe McHale

=== Changes in affiliation ===
Name	LEA	Elected as	New affiliation	Date
Gerry Ginty	Ballina	Independent	Aontú	February 2019
