= County Hall, Castlebar =

Municipal building in County Mayo, Ireland

- Áras an Chontae, Caisleán an Bharraigh
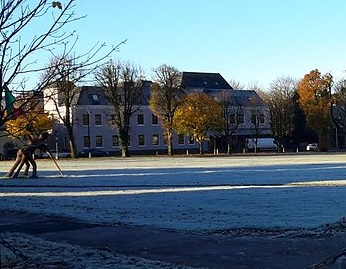
- County Hall, Castlebar

- Location within Ireland

General information
- Location: Castlebar, County Mayo, Ireland
- Coordinates: 53.8541°N 9.2970°W
- Completed: 1989

County Hall (Irish: Áras an Chontae, Caisleán an Bharraigh) is a municipal facility on The Mall in Castlebar, County Mayo, Ireland.

== History ==
The site currently occupied by County Hall was home to the county infirmary until 1932. Mayo County Council, which had previously held its meetings in Castlebar Courthouse, acquired the site and used it as a machinery yard and fire station before converting it for use as the new county council offices in 1989.
