= Lisa Chambers =

Irish former politician (born 1986)

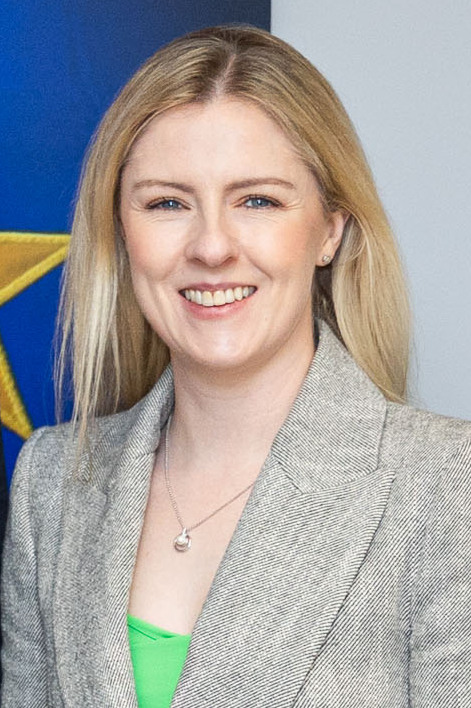
- Chambers in 2024

Leader of the Seanad
- In office 17 December 2022 – 30 January 2025
- Taoiseach: Leo Varadkar; Simon Harris
- Deputy: Regina Doherty; Seán Kyne
- Preceded by: Regina Doherty
- Succeeded by: Séan Kyne

Deputy leader of the Seanad
- In office 29 June 2020 – 17 December 2022
- Taoiseach: Micheál Martin
- Leader: Regina Doherty
- Preceded by: Catherine Noone
- Succeeded by: Regina Doherty

Leader of Fianna Fáil in the Seanad
- In office 29 June 2020 – 30 January 2025
- Leader: Micheál Martin
- Preceded by: Catherine Ardagh
- Succeeded by: Fiona O'Loughlin

Senator
- In office 29 June 2020 – 30 January 2025
- Constituency: Cultural and Educational Panel

Teachta Dála
- In office February 2016 – February 2020
- Constituency: Mayo

Personal details
- Born: 24 August 1986 (age 39) Castlebar, County Mayo, Ireland
- Party: Fianna Fáil
- Spouse: Jarlath Munnelly
- Children: 2
- Education: NUI Galway; University College Dublin; King's Inns
- Website: lisachambers.ie

Military service
- Allegiance: Ireland
- Branch/service: Army Reserve
- Years of service: 2003–2016
- Rank: Second lieutenant
- Unit: Cavalry Corps
- Awards: Service Medal; Centenary Medal

Lisa Chambers (born 24 August 1986) is an Irish former Fianna Fáil politician. At the 2014 local elections, she was elected to Mayo County Council, where she served from 2014 to 2016. At the 2016 general election, she won a seat in Dáil Éireann, where she served as a Teachta Dála (TD) for the Mayo constituency from 2016 to 2020. After losing her Dáil seat at the 2020 general election, she was elected to the Cultural and Educational Panel of Seanad Éireann at the 2020 Seanad election. She served as a senator from 2020 to 2025 and was leader of the Seanad from 2022 to 2025.

Chambers failed to win a seat in the Midlands–North-West constituency at the 2024 European Parliament election and also failed to regain her Dáil seat at the 2024 general election. She did not contest the 2025 Seanad election, and in January 2025 she announced her decision to leave public life. The following month, she was appointed director of public affairs at Consello, a global advisory firm founded by Irish-American businessman Declan Kelly.

== Early life and military service ==
Chambers is from Ballyheane, County Mayo, around 8 kilometres (5.0 mi) south of Castlebar. The eldest of five children, she has three sisters and a brother. After attending St Joseph's Secondary School, Castlebar, she earned a degree in Commerce and Law from NUI Galway, a Masters in Commercial Law from University College Dublin, and a bar qualification from the King's Inns. She practiced as a barrister, setting up her own legal practice in Castlebar.

Chambers joined the Reserve Defence Forces as a teenager and served for 13 years. Commissioned as an officer in the Army Reserve in November 2012, she served as a second lieutenant with the 1st Armoured Cavalry Squadron (Curragh Camp) before transferring to the D Company (Castlebar), 6th Infantry Battalion. She resigned her commission when elected to the Dáil.

She is unrelated to Fianna Fáil politicians Frank Chambers and Jack Chambers.

== Political career ==
=== 2011 general election ===
Chambers ran at the 2011 general election for the Mayo constituency, but was eliminated on the fifth count. At the time, she was the youngest Fianna Fáil candidate in the country, at age 24. She was described as being part of Micheál Martin's effort to recruit young, progressive politicians and change the elderly, male-dominated image of Fianna Fáil.

=== Councillor (2014–2016) ===
Chambers was elected to Mayo County Council at the 2014 local elections, recording the second-highest number of votes in the country. She was credited with spearheading the revival of Fianna Fáil in the Castlebar area after the 2012 Mahon Tribunal report had discredited former minister Pádraig Flynn.

=== TD (2016–2020) ===
At the 2016 general election, Chambers was elected as a Teachta Dála (TD) for the Mayo constituency. On the tenth count, she won the fourth seat in the constituency, after Fine Gael's Enda Kenny and Michael Ring and Fianna Fáil's Dara Calleary. Appointed spokesperson on Defence in the Fianna Fáil Front Bench on 18 May 2016, she succeeded Seán Ó Fearghaíl, who had been elected Ceann Comhairle of the 32nd Dáil. She was later given the Brexit portfolio in a reshuffle.

She failed to win re-election to the Dáil at the 2020 general election, losing a battle for the fourth seat in her constituency to Fine Gael's Alan Dillon. Speaking on Sean O'Rourke's Two Tribes podcast, she attributed the outcome to her support for repealing the Eighth Amendment "in what is predominantly a conservative constituency, particularly among Fianna Fail voters". Elsewhere, she stated that some voters had expressed reservations about electing a TD who would be taking maternity leave, as she had been pregnant during the campaign. However, the Business Post newspaper also attributed the loss of Chambers's seat to controversies around voting irregularities and expense claims.

=== Senator (2020–2025) ===
At the 2020 Seanad election, Chambers was elected as a Senator for the Cultural and Educational Panel. She was Fianna Fáil's spokesperson on European and Foreign Affairs in the Seanad. She also chaired the Seanad Special Select Committee on the Withdrawal of the United Kingdom from the European Union. She was appointed leader of the Seanad in December 2022.

=== 2024 European Parliament election ===
In July 2023, Chambers announced her intent to run for the 2024 European Parliament election in the Midlands–North-West constituency. However, at a Fianna Fáil selection convention on 5 February 2024—a three-way contest among Chambers, Laois–Offaly TD Barry Cowen, and senator Niall Blaney from Donegal—she was eliminated on the first count. Cowen won the nomination, narrowly defeating Blaney on the second count. Chambers's team alleged that Cowen's and Blaney’s teams had asked party members not to vote for her, reassuring them that the party would put her on the ticket regardless. Cowen disputed this allegation, claiming that he had simply asked members to choose the best candidate.

On 29 February 2024, Fianna Fáil added both Chambers and Blaney to its Midlands–North-West ticket. Running three candidates in the constituency was described as a "surprise move", given that Fianna Fáil had not had an MEP there since Pat "the Cope" Gallagher lost his seat at the 2014 European Parliament election. Some party members expressed concern that the strategy would split the Fianna Fáil vote. The Journal claimed that the party had always anticipated running Chambers and Cowen but had added Blaney after his strong performance at the selection convention. However, the Business Post called Chambers a "dimming star" within Fianna Fáil, following the loss of her Dáil seat and her poor showing at the selection convention. It quoted a senior Fianna Fáil TD who said the party had added Chambers to the ticket only after Fine Gael incumbent MEP Maria Walsh had called its other candidates "male, pale and stale". In the election, Chambers received 44,069 (6.5%) first-preference votes and was eliminated on the 19th count, following the elimination of Blaney. Cowen was the only Fianna Fáil candidate elected in the constituency.

=== 2024 general election ===
Chambers and Calleary were selected as the two Fianna Fáil candidates for the Mayo constituency at the 2024 general election. Although Calleary retained his seat, Chambers was not elected. She received 5,584 first-preference votes (7.9%) and was eliminated on the seventh count.

=== Departure from politics ===
In January 2025, Chambers announced that she would not contest the 2025 Seanad election and would leave public life. While saying she was "not completely ruling out" a return to politics at some point in the future, she stated: "For now, I am planning to take a new direction in my life." The following month, it was announced that Chambers had been appointed director of public affairs at Consello, a global advisory firm founded by Irish-American businessman Declan Kelly.

== Controversies ==
Chambers was criticised for claiming, during a 29 November 2018 Dáil debate on the Health (Regulation of Termination of Pregnancy) Bill 2018, that "Abortion regret is made up and it does not exist". Several days later, she apologised for any hurt she had caused, stating that her comments had been taken out of context.

In October 2019, Chambers became embroiled in controversy over voting irregularities. Shown to have voted on behalf of both party colleague Dara Calleary and herself on a forestry motion amendment, Chambers claimed she had pressed Calleary's voting button by accident. The Oireachtas Committee on Members' Interests later determined that Chambers had "acted in good faith" and had voted "inadvertently". In December, the Sunday Independent highlighted Oireachtas video recordings from 17January 2019 that appeared to show Chambers sitting in Timmy Dooley's seat for fifty minutes while seven votes were recorded; although not visible in the footage, votes were also recorded from her own seat.

Chambers also faced allegations of expenses fraud. She was among a number of TDs discovered to be claiming a €25 daily allowance for mobile phone roaming charges while travelling in the EU, two years after roaming charges had been abolished. She was found to have claimed a total of €525. In February 2020, she was found to be driving from her home to the Oireachtas along a route that was 35 kilometres (22 mi) longer than the shortest possible journey, placing her in "band 9" of the travel allowance table and increasing her annual travel allowance by €1,350. Chambers defended her preferred route as faster, since it avoided a number of small towns. Several months later, she was found to have received expenses of €6,626 for April and May 2020, even though the Seanad was closed at that time due to the COVID-19 pandemic.

In 2020, the Irish Independent reported that Chambers had hired two of her sisters as secretarial assistants. She was among three senators reported to have hired family members for taxpayer-funded jobs, a practice described as controversial although not specifically proscribed.

Chambers faced criticism following the 2024 Irish constitutional referendums on Family and Care when she admitted to having voted No in both referendums, despite having been photographed and filmed canvassing for Yes votes. Then-Taoiseach Leo Varadkar rebuked Chambers, stating that "If I ask people to vote yes, then I vote yes. If I ask people to vote no, I vote no."

Chambers was one of three senators who sponsored the controversial Hate Crime Bill 2020. However, with Jim O'Callaghan and Senator Eugene Murphy, she subsequently laid out concerns about the proposed legislation, including that young men could be stigmatised for life as a result of "foolish comments."

== Harassment ==
In May 2024, while Chambers was visiting a relative's home in a rural area near Castlebar, a man in his early 20s was discovered hiding in the bushes outside with his belt removed and several buttons on his trousers undone. Reported to be a member of a rival party, the man had previously engaged Chambers in conversation after she gave a political speech in another county. Gardaí arrested the man on suspicion of stalking and called the incident "sinister and disturbing". Chambers had previously received a handwritten rape threat at her constituency office but the two incidents were not believed to be connected. In a social media post, the National Women's Council of Ireland stated: "The targeting of female politicians is unacceptable. This cannot be tolerated, for either the sake of the women targeted or for the power of democracy. We send support and solidarity to Lisa Chambers.”

== Personal life ==
In April 2023, Chambers married her long-term partner, Fine Gael politician Jarlath Munnelly, a Mayo county councillor who is also a teacher and youth services coordinator. The couple have one child, who was born in April 2020. After giving birth during the early stages of the COVID-19 pandemic, Chambers criticised as "barbaric" the restrictions in maternity hospitals that had prevented women from having their partners present during labour and childbirth.

Dáil	Election	Deputy (Party)	Deputy (Party)	Deputy (Party)	Deputy (Party)	Deputy (Party)
28th	1997	Beverley Flynn (FF)	Tom Moffatt (FF)	Enda Kenny (FG)	Michael Ring (FG)	Jim Higgins (FG)
29th	2002	Beverley Flynn (FF)	John Carty (FF)	Enda Kenny (FG)	Michael Ring (FG)	Jerry Cowley (Ind.)
30th	2007	Beverley Flynn (Ind.)	Dara Calleary (FF)	Enda Kenny (FG)	Michael Ring (FG)	John O'Mahony (FG)
31st	2011	Michelle Mulherin (FG)	Dara Calleary (FF)	Enda Kenny (FG)	Michael Ring (FG)	John O'Mahony (FG)
32nd	2016	Lisa Chambers (FF)	Dara Calleary (FF)	Enda Kenny (FG)	Michael Ring (FG)	4 seats 2016–2024
33rd	2020	Rose Conway-Walsh (SF)	Dara Calleary (FF)	Alan Dillon (FG)	Michael Ring (FG)	4 seats 2016–2024
34th	2024	Rose Conway-Walsh (SF)	Dara Calleary (FF)	Alan Dillon (FG)	Keira Keogh (FG)	Paul Lawless (Aon)
