= Catherine Noone =

Irish former politician (born 1976)

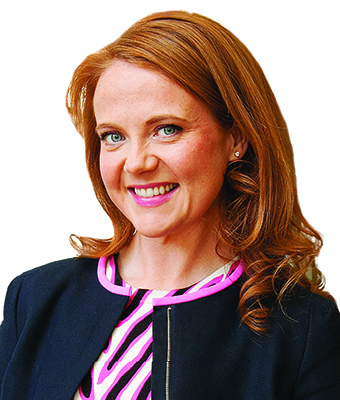

Deputy leader of the Seanad
- In office 1 July 2016 – 27 March 2020
- Taoiseach: Enda Kenny; Leo Varadkar
- Leader: Jerry Buttimer
- Preceded by: Ivana Bacik
- Succeeded by: Lisa Chambers

Senator
- In office 25 May 2011 – 29 June 2020
- Constituency: Industrial and Commercial Panel

Personal details
- Born: 24 June 1976 (age 50) Claremorris, County Mayo, Ireland
- Party: Fine Gael
- Education: NUI Galway
- Website: catherinenoone.ie

Catherine Anna Noone (born 24 June 1976) is an Irish former Fine Gael politician. She served as a Senator on the Industrial and Commercial Panel from April 2011 to March 2020.

Prior to her election to the Seanad she was a member of Dublin City Council from 2009 to 2011 for the South East Inner City electoral area where she was elected on the last count over 200 votes short of a quota.

Originally from County Mayo, she studied law in NUI, Galway and is a practising solicitor.

She was the Fine Gael Seanad spokesperson on Arts and Culture.

Noone stood for the Dáil in the 2016 general election in the four seater Dublin West constituency but was eliminated after the second count with 1,074 first preference votes. She was later nominated for the Seanad and was elected on the 26th count. After being elected to her second term in Seanad Éireann, she was appointed by the Taoiseach as Deputy leader of the Seanad in July 2016.

In 2017, Noone was chair of the Oireachtas Committee on the Eighth Amendment, which recommended that it be repealed. Noone was then one of the primary members of Fine Gael who campaigned for a yes vote in the subsequent referendum of 2018, which ultimately led to the repeal of the amendment in Ireland.

She was an unsuccessful candidate for the Dublin Bay North constituency at the 2020 general election, and lost her seat at the 2020 Seanad election, being eliminated on the 14th count.

== Controversies ==
In 2015, Noone called for Mixed martial arts to be banned in Ireland, calling it a "vile so-called sport", and announced she had sent a letter to the Minister for Transport, Tourism and Sport Paschal Donohoe asking for his view on the idea. This was met with widespread criticism in Ireland. During an interview with Ryan Tubridy on the matter, it was revealed Noone she had never once seen an MMA match, was not familiar with how the sport operated, and at points seemed to confuse it with professional wrestling, believing the fights to be pre-determined. Following the interview Noone made an about-face, admitting she had "jumped the gun" on the issue. Later that month, she called for the Irish Sports Council to recognise MMA.

In 2018, Noone was accused of being ageist after she described a priest from County Mayo as an "octogenarian" on her Twitter page. Her comment concerned the priest's homily during Easter Sunday mass at Knock Shrine, County Mayo in which he indirectly outlined the churches anti-abortion stance in the run-up to the referendum on abortion in May 2018. Noone was criticised over censuring the well-established opinions of the Catholic Church on abortion while voluntarily attending the service. She defended her comments before apologising and deleting the comment on Twitter, citing she "overreached" and that "all opinions should be voiced".

In the run-up to the 2020 general election, she was criticised for tweeting a photograph of her campaign van parked on a footpath. Among those critical of her actions, and her response to criticism, was disability activist Joanne O'Riordan who accused Senator Noone of making "the lives of people with disabilities harder to live". Noone initially tweeted that people should "get a grip" and cease complaining, but then deleted the tweet, and she later apologised.

In the same election campaign, she referred to the Taoiseach, Leo Varadkar as "autistic", before denying having said it. Having been made aware that her remarks were recorded, she said that she didn't mean to use the word in that context and gave examples of potentially offensive words that could be used out of context, including "special" and "nigger". She then clarified that she would "never use the n-word", and said it was a bad example. On 28 January 2020 she issued an apology.

The apology was not accepted by leading autism and Asperger campaigner Fiona Ferris, the deputy chief executive of AsIAm, an autism charity who called for Noone and other politicians to learn about autism. Ferris added "If we go about the attitude that people can say whatever they want and then totally withdraw a statement, I mean, the world would not be a very nice place." Carly Bailey, a candidate in the 2020 election and a parent of a son with autism added in separate comments that "her words have hurt a great many people on the autism spectrum and their families."
