= Mark Duffy (politician) =

Irish politician

Senator Mark Duffy
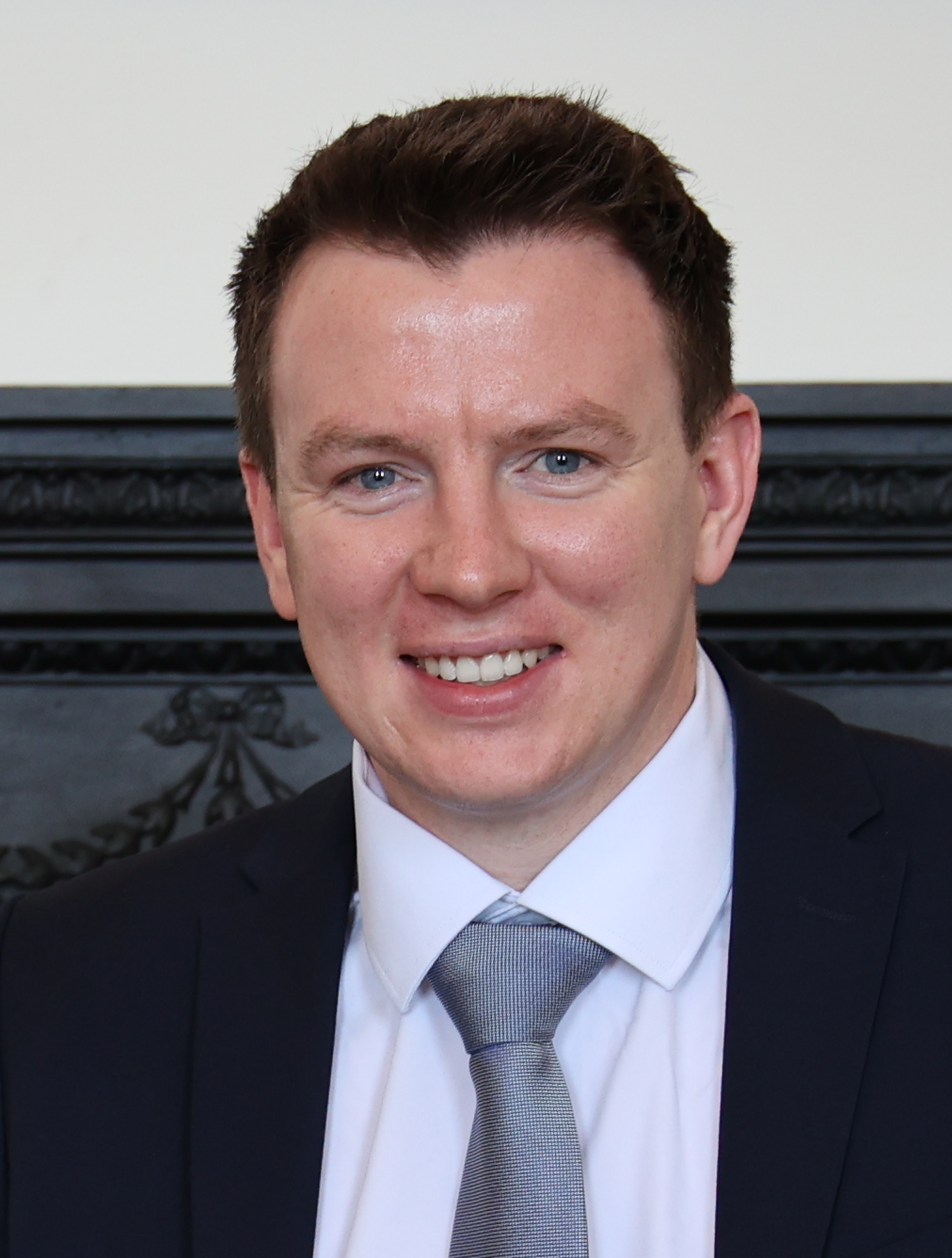
- Duffy in 2025

Senator
- Incumbent
- Assumed office January 2025
- Constituency: Labour Panel

Personal details
- Born: County Mayo, Ireland
- Party: Fine Gael (since 2024)
- Other political affiliations: Independent

Mark Duffy is an Irish Fine Gael politician who has been a senator for the Labour Panel since January 2025.

He was a member of Mayo County Council for the Ballina area from May 2019 to January 2025. He was elected as an independent candidate at the 2019 Mayo County Council election, and re-elected as an independent in May 2024. He joined Fine Gael in October 2024. He was an unsuccessful candidate for the Mayo constituency at the 2024 general election.
