= 2004 Mayo County Council election =

Part of the 2004 Irish local elections

- 11 June 2004

All 31 seats on Mayo County Council
	First party	Second party	Third party
Party	Fine Gael	Fianna Fáil	Sinn Féin
Seats won	15	12	1
Seat change	+2	-4	+1
	Fourth party	Fifth party
Party	Labour	Independent
Seats won	1	2
Seat change	-	+1
- Map showing the area of Mayo County Council
Council control after election
TBD

An election to Mayo County Council took place on 11 June 2004 as part of that year's Irish local elections. 31 councillors were elected from seven local electoral areas (LEAs) for a five-year term of office on the electoral system of proportional representation by means of the single transferable vote (PR-STV).

== Results by party ==
Party	Seats	±	First Pref. votes	FPv%	±%
Fine Gael	15	+2	27,545	43.18	
Fianna Fáil	12	-4	23,615	37.02	
Sinn Féin	1	+1	2,706	4.24	
Labour	1	-	1,439	2.26	
Independent	2	+1	7,317	11.47	
Totals	31	-	63,795	100.00	—

== Results by local electoral area ==
=== Ballina ===
Ballina - 6 seats
Party	Candidate	FPv%	Count							
Party	Candidate	FPv%	1	2	3	4	5	6	7	8
Fianna Fáil	Annie Mae Reape*	15.68	1,925							
Fine Gael	Seamus Weir*	13.75	1,688	1,710	1,775					
Fine Gael	Eddie Staunton*	12.30	1,510	1,514	1,561	1,622	1,700	1,778		
Fine Gael	Michelle Mulherin	9.79	1,202	1,224	1,316	1,456	1,508	1,906		
Fianna Fáil	Stephen Molloy*	9.54	1,171	1,185	1,192	1,236	1,463	1,528	1,544	1,549
Fine Gael	Jarlath Munnelly	8.69	1,067	1,071	1,105	1,171	1,433	1,515	1,568	1,577
Fianna Fáil	Johnnie O'Malley	7.92	972	1,030	1,079	1,180	1,271	1,550	1,633	1,643
Progressive Democrats	Greg Jackson	7.18	881	895	915	1,043	1,090			
Fianna Fáil	Brian Golden*	6.33	777	786	792	869				
Independent	Raymond Collins	5.93	728	743	768					
Fine Gael	Seán Newcombe	2.87	352	361						
Electorate: 19,794 Valid: 12,273 (62.0%) Spoilt: 185 Quota: 1,754 Turnout: 12,458 (62.94%)

=== Ballinrobe ===
Ballinrobe - 3 seats
Party	Candidate	FPv%	Count			
Party	Candidate	FPv%	1	2	3	4
Fianna Fáil	Damien Ryan*	23.16	1,551	1,584	1,986	
Fine Gael	Patsy O'Brien	23.13	1,549	1,731		
Independent	Harry Walsh	18.20	1,219	1,342	1,484	1,632
Fine Gael	Michael Burke*	17.10	1,145	1,216	1,369	1,443
Fianna Fáil	Nora Conroy	11.47	768	808		
Fine Gael	Padraig Flannery	6.94	465			
Electorate: 9,957 Valid: 6,697 (67.82%) Spoilt: 85 Quota: 1,675 Turnout: 6,782 (68.11%)

=== Belmullet ===
Belmullet - 4 seats
Party	Candidate	FPv%	Count				
Party	Candidate	FPv%	1	2	3	4	5
Fianna Fáil	Tim Quinn*	17.62	1,337	1,441	1,662		
Fine Gael	Gerry Coyle*	15.79	1,198	1,277	1,399	1,437	1,711
Independent	Michael Holmes	13.74	1,043	1,138	1,263	1,278	1,520
Fine Gael	Pat Kilbane*	13.39	1,016	1,023	1,049	1,051	
Fianna Fáil	Michael McNamara	12.49	948	948	1,066	1,139	1,533
Sinn Féin	Rose Conway-Walsh	12.18	924	980	1,099	1,115	1,191
Fianna Fáil	Frank Leneghan*	9.72	738	754			
Independent	Michael Healy	5.07	385				
Electorate: 12,514 Valid: 7,589 (60.64%) Spoilt: 101 Quota: 1,518 Turnout: 7,690 (61.45%)

=== Castlebar ===
Castlebar - 6 seats
Party	Candidate	FPv%	Count							
Party	Candidate	FPv%	1	2	3	4	5	6	7	8
Fine Gael	Cyril Burke*	12.44	1,611	1,652	1,688	1,793	1,819	1,886		
Fine Gael	Henry Kenny*	12.21	1,581	1,640	1,674	1,950				
Fine Gael	Paddy McGuinness	12.16	1,575	1,655	1,780	1,853				
Fianna Fáil	Seán Bourke*	10.76	1,527	1,625	1,801	2,013				
Fianna Fáil	Al McDonnell*	10.48	1,357	1,495	1,573	1,601	1,643	1,647	1,919	
Independent	Michael Kilcoyne	9.30	1,204	1,228	1,303	1,339	1,361	1,374	1,550	1,570
Labour	Johnny Mee*	8.21	1,063	1,134	1,238	1,279	1,289	1,304	1,576	1,625
Fine Gael	John Devaney*	6.67	864	881	891					
Fianna Fáil	Iarla Duffy	6.13	794	839	937	965	981	982		
Fianna Fáil	Aidan Crowley	5.44	704	771						
Fianna Fáil	George O'Malley	5.17	669							
Electorate: 21,892 Valid: 12,949 (59.15%) Spoilt: 210 Quota: 1,850 Turnout: 13,159 (60.11%)

=== Claremorris ===
Claremorris - 4 seats
Party	Candidate	FPv%	Count			
Party	Candidate	FPv%	1	2	3	4
Fine Gael	John Cribbin*	21.42	1,693			
Fine Gael	Tom Connolly	20.37	1,610			
Fianna Fáil	Patrick McHugh*	17.43	1,378	1,390	1,415	1,556
Fianna Fáil	Michael Carty*	14.65	1,158	1,179	1,299	1,513
Independent	Richard Finn*	13.39	1,058	1,068	1,226	1,342
Independent	Stephen Finn	7.00	553	583	646	
Fine Gael	John Kelly	5.74	454	493		
Electorate: 12,295 Valid: 7,904 (64.29%) Spoilt: 144 Quota: 1,581 Turnout: 8,048 (65.46%)

=== Swinford ===
Swinford - 4 seats
Party	Candidate	FPv%	Count						
Party	Candidate	FPv%	1	2	3	4	5	6	7
Sinn Féin	Gerry Murray*	22.07	1,782						
Fine Gael	Eugene Lavin	20.25	1,635						
Fianna Fáil	Jimmy Maloney*	13.97	1,128	1,140	1,159	1,286	1,371	1,693	
Fine Gael	Joseph Mellett*	14.80	1,042	1,059	1,128	1,184	1,220	1,392	1,446
Fine Gael	John Flannery*	19.20	944	1,013	1,048	1,105	1,290	1,367	1,391
Fianna Fáil	Brendan McNulty	14.38	545	559	600	626	696		
Fianna Fáil	Seán Murphy	14.38	416	445	455	466			
Labour	Michael Griffin	14.38	376	390	403				
Independent	Martin Peyton	14.38	205	217					
Electorate: 12,630 Valid: 8,073 (63.92%) Spoilt: 156 Quota: 1,615 Turnout: 8,229 (65.15%)

=== Westport ===
Westport - 4 seats
Party	Candidate	FPv%	Count					
Party	Candidate	FPv%	1	2	3	4	5	6
Fianna Fáil	Margaret Adams*	17.38	1,444	1,488	1,600	1,816		
Fianna Fáil	Frank Chambers*	15.86	1,318	1,349	1,556	1,788		
Fine Gael	John O'Malley	15.07	1,252	1,296	1,493	1,534	1,550	1,570
Fine Gael	Peter Flynn	13.62	1,132	1,186	1,339	1,394	1,424	1,442
Fianna Fáil	Peter Sweeney*	17.21	990	1,005	1,051			
Fine Gael	Austin O'Malley	11.55	960	982	1,056	1,498	1,549	1,617
Independent	Christy Loftus	9.86	819	936				
Green	Dr. Lucille Ryan-O'Shea	3.51	292					
Independent	Tom King	1.24	103					
Electorate: 12,390 Valid: 8,310 (67.07%) Spoilt: 130 Quota: 1,663 Turnout: 8,440 (68.12%)
