= Castlebar Courthouse =

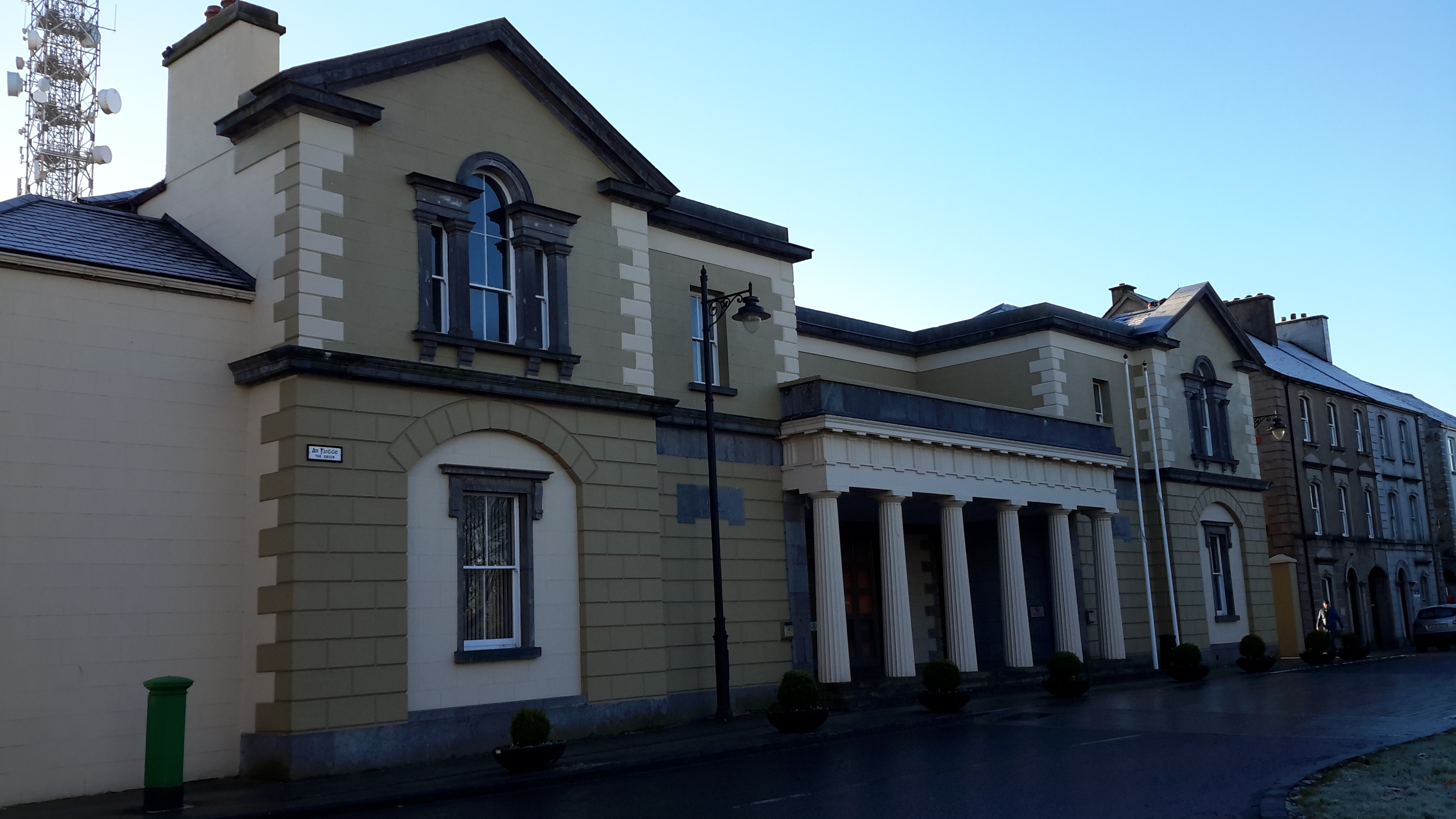
- Castlebar Courthouse

- Location within Ireland

General information
- Architectural style: Neoclassical style
- Location: Castlebar, County Mayo, Ireland
- Coordinates: 53.8541°N 9.2970°W
- Completed: 1822

Design and construction
- Architect: George Papworth

Castlebar Courthouse is a judicial facility on The Mall in Castlebar, County Mayo, Ireland.

== History ==
The courthouse, which was designed by George Papworth in the neoclassical style and built in ashlar stone, was completed in 1822. It was rebuilt to a design by George Wilkinson in 1860. The design involved a symmetrical main frontage facing The Mall; there was a short flight of steps leading up to a large hexastyle portico with Doric order columns supporting a modillioned cornice and an entablature; the portico was flanked by two bays on each side with the end bays, which were projected forward as pavilions, featuring Venetian windows on the first floor.

The building was originally used as a facility for dispensing justice but, following the implementation of the Local Government (Ireland) Act 1898, which established county councils in every county, it also became the meeting place for Mayo County Council. The county council moved to County Hall in 1989. By then the courthouse had fallen into a state of disrepair and, after an extensive programme of refurbishment works, it was re-opened in 2004.
