= 2024 Mayo County Council election =

Part of the 2024 Irish local elections

- 7 June 2024

All 30 seats on Mayo County Council 16 seats needed for a majority
Party	Fine Gael	Fianna Fáil	Sinn Féin
Last election	12	11	1
Current seats	11	11	1
Party	Independent
Last election	6
Current seats	7
- Area of Mayo County Council
Incumbent Council control
- Fine Gael
- Independent

An election to all 30 seats on Mayo County Council was held on 7 June 2024 as part of the 2024 Irish local elections. County Mayo is divided into 6 local electoral areas (LEAs) to elect councillors for a five-year term of office on the electoral system of proportional representation by means of the single transferable vote (PR-STV).

== Incumbents retiring ==
The following councillors were not seeking re-election:

Constitutency	Councillor	Party
Claremorris	John Cribbin	Independent
Ballina	Séamus Weir	Independent

== Results by party ==
Party	Candidates	Seats	±	1st pref	FPv%	±%
Fine Gael	15	10	▼2	19,608	29.48	▼7.77
Fianna Fáil	13	10	▼1	17,278	25.98	▼3.95
Sinn Féin	9	1	Steady	6,248	9.40	▲2.03
Independent Ireland	3	1	New	2,911	4.38	New
Aontú	2	1	▲1	1,797	2.70	▲0.60
Green	2	0	Steady	410	0.62	▼0.38
The Irish People	3	0	New	325	0.49	New
People Before Profit	1	0	Steady	246	0.37	▼0.32
Labour	1	0	Steady	228	0.34	▲0.11
Irish Freedom	1	0	New	160	0.24	New
Social Democrats	1	0	Steady	154	0.23	▼0.06
Independent	22	7	▲1	17,137	25.77	▲5.13
Total	73	30	Steady	66,502	100.00	

== Results by local electoral area ==
*: Outgoing councillor elected in 2019.
†: Outgoing councillor coopted subsequent to the 2019 election.

=== Ballina ===
Ballina: 6 seats
Party	Candidate	FPv%	Count										
Party	Candidate	FPv%	1	2	3	4	5	6	7	8	9	10	11
Fine Gael	John O'Hara	19.24%	2,391										
Independent	Mark Duffy	18.73%	2,328										
Fianna Fáil	Michael Loftus	10.47%	1,301	1,346	1,389	1,391	1,396	1,409	1,435	1,466	1,517	1,560	1,612
Fianna Fáil	Annie May Reape	9.47%	1,177	1,409	1,537	1,548	1,561	1,579	1,710	1,749	1,956		
Independent	Joe Faughan	9.09%	1,130	1,185	1,239	1,262	1,285	1,300	1,360	1,553	1,613	1,631	1,725
Fianna Fáil	David Alexander	8.04%	999	1,038	1,065	1,070	1,078	1,088	1,104	1,123	1,173	1,183	1,296
Fine Gael	Jarlath Munnelly	7.51%	933	1,022	1,073	1,079	1,083	1,094	1,121	1,132	1,269	1,305	1,402
Sinn Féin	Úna Morris	3.81%	474	487	516	523	529	698	719	765	787	795	
Fine Gael	Hugh Rouse	3.11%	386	465	557	563	567	577	640	671			
Independent	Joe Doocey	3.08%	383	395	408	438	546	560	601				
Independent	Willie Nolan	2.67%	332	355	409	425	451	465					
Sinn Féin	Antonio Cafolla	2.06%	256	272	299	305	320						
Independent	Garie Beattie	1.52%	189	194	213	253							
Independent	Jo Mullen	0.65%	81	86	97								
Independent	Keith Howley	0.56%	69	71	75								
Electorate: 21,509 Valid: 12,429 Spoilt: 119 Quota: 1,776 Turnout: 12,548 (58.34%)

=== Belmullet ===
Belmullet: 3 Seats
Party	Candidate	FPv%	Count				
Party	Candidate	FPv%	1	2	3	4	5
Fianna Fáil	Paul McNamara	23.75%	1,745	1,756	1,765	2,228	
Fine Gael	Gerry Coyle	20.68%	1,519	1,542	1,614	1,867	
Fianna Fáil	Sean Carey	19.81%	1,455	1,478	1,543	1,643	1,771
Sinn Féin	Rosaleen Lally	14.69%	1,079	1,127	1,215	1,389	1,498
Fine Gael	Pat Chambers	14.32%	1,052	1,057	1,084		
Independent	John Paul Carey	4.51%	331	368			
Green	Micheál O’Conaill	1.59%	117				
Independent	Jay Heneghan	0.65%	48				
Electorate: 12,131 Valid: 7,346 Spoilt: 80 Quota: 1,837 Turnout: 7,426 (61.22%)

=== Castlebar ===
Castlebar: 7 Seats
Party	Candidate	FPv%	Count													
Party	Candidate	FPv%	1	2	3	4	5	6	7	8	9	10	11	12	13	14
Independent	Michael Kilcoyne	16.00%	2,403													
Fine Gael	Ger Deere	13.04%	1,958													
Fianna Fáil	Al McDonnell	10.86%	1,631	1,703	1,709	1,710	1,717	1,722	1,734	1,751	1,766	1,795	1,834	1,839	1,918	
Fianna Fáil	Blackie Gavin	10.16%	1,526	1,648	1,664	1,664	1,666	1,694	1,699	1,716	1,740	1,830	1,960			
Fine Gael	Cyril Burke	9.04%	1,358	1,396	1,411	1,413	1,416	1,421	1,425	1,443	1,453	1,494	1,539	1,546	1,608	1,779
Fine Gael	Donna Sheridan	6.63%	996	1,037	1,051	1,055	1,062	1,079	1,088	1,100	1,118	1,156	1,217	1,230	1,357	1,533
Independent	Stephen Kerr	5.99%	899	935	936	961	965	976	980	986	996	1,057	1,082	1,102	1,183	1,226
Fianna Fáil	Martin McLoughlin	5.56%	835	867	875	875	880	892	899	904	912	928	1,052	1,068	1,113	
Independent	Harry Barrett	4.95%	743	800	809	815	832	860	868	909	993	1,084	1,150	1,167	1,381	1,575
Sinn Féin	Donna Hyland	3.99%	599	627	629	636	641	647	789	812	903	953	1,007	1,012		
Independent	Gerry Loftus	3.61%	542	565	566	568	612	647	653	658	669	696				
Independent Ireland	Donal Geraghty	2.94%	442	477	480	486	488	501	505	518	533					
People Before Profit	Joe Daly	1.64%	246	257	258	261	286	293	304	332						
Labour	Kamal Uddin	1.52%	228	234	237	244	259	261	265							
Sinn Féin	Maura O’Sullivan	1.37%	206	216	217	220	222	226								
Independent	Brendan Lavelle	1.15%	172	181	182	185	195									
Social Democrats	Aidan Browne	1.03%	154	156	156	157										
The Irish People	Tom Moran	0.28%	42	45	45											
Independent	Maksym Shalomon	0.23%	35	36	36											
Electorate: 25,979 Valid: 15,016 Spoilt: 121 Quota: 1,878 Turnout: 15,137 (58.27%)

=== Claremorris ===
Claremorris: 6 Seats
Party	Candidate	FPv%	Count						
Party	Candidate	FPv%	1	2	3	4	5	6	7
Independent	Patsy O'Brien	20.02%	2,738						
Independent	Richard Finn	13.39%	1,831	1,926	2,047				
Fianna Fáil	Damien Ryan	11.82%	1,616	1,828	1,901	1,907	1,943	2,116	
Fine Gael	Alma Gallagher	10.76%	1,471	1,500	1,536	1,545	1,677	2,041	
Fine Gael	Michael Burke	10.65%	1,456	1,650	1,726	1,732	1,759	1,770	1,777
Fine Gael	Tom Connolly	8.89%	1,216	1,300	1,319	1,342	1,482	1,536	1,568
Aontú	Paul Lawless	8.61%	1,177	1,218	1,325	1,334	1,605	1,770	1,803
Fianna Fáil	Stephen Nolan	6.43%	880	889	901	906	945		
Independent Ireland	Mark Devane	4.94%	676	727	795	820			
Sinn Féin	Eamon Phelan	2.27%	311	329					
Independent	Geraldine Kelly	1.14%	156	191					
The Irish People	Árón Ceallaigh	0.67%	92	101					
Independent	Sandra Sweetman	0.46%	56	63					
Electorate: 23,184 Valid: 13,676 Spoilt: 137 Quota: 1,954 Turnout: 13,813 (59.58%)

=== Swinford ===
Swinford: 4 Seats
Party	Candidate	FPv%	Count				
Party	Candidate	FPv%	1	2	3	4	5
Sinn Féin	Gerry Murray	18.21%	1,587	1,615	1,820		
Fianna Fáil	Adrian Forkan	16.74%	1,459	1,476	1,525	1,663	1,667
Fianna Fáil	John Caulfield	15.21%	1,326	1,339	1,476	1,601	1,643
Sinn Féin	John Sheahan	14.96%	1,304	1,316	1,359	1,610	1,636
Fine Gael	Neil Cruise	14.35%	1,251	1,282	1,308	1,633	1,637
Fine Gael	Antoinette Peyton	10.07%	878	890	953		
Aontú	Tommy Horan	7.11%	620	704			
The Irish People	Marion Gordon	2.19%	191				
Independent	Seán Forkin	1.15%	100				
Electorate: 15,477 Valid: 8,716 Spoilt: 111 Quota: 1,744 Turnout: 8,827 (57.03%)

=== Westport ===
Westport: 4 seats
Party	Candidate	FPv%	Count				
Party	Candidate	FPv%	1	2	3	4	5
Independent Ireland	Chris Maxwell	19.24%	1,793	1,939			
Fine Gael	Peter Flynn	16.73%	1,559	1,694	1,700	2,256	
Independent	John O'Malley	14.48%	1,350	1,495	1,525	1,715	1,797
Fianna Fáil	Brendan Mulroy	14.25%	1,328	1,410	1,420	1,637	1,792
Independent	Christy Hyland	13.10%	1,221	1,343	1,363	1,588	1,742
Fine Gael	Keira Keogh	12.71%	1,184	1,282	1,290		
Sinn Féin	Karen Gallagher	4.64%	432				
Green	Peter Nolan	3.14%	293				
Irish Freedom	Niall McCormack	1.72%	160				
Electorate: 15,148 Valid: 9,320 Spoilt: 63 Quota: 1,865 Turnout: 9,383 (61.94%)
