= Local Appointments Commission =

Within the politics of Ireland, the Local Appointments Commission was created by the Local Authorities (Officers and Employees) Act 1926, as enacted by the government of W. T. Cosgrave, to counter allegations of favouritism at local levels in government in Ireland.
