= Rose Conway-Walsh =

Irish politician (born 1964/1965)

Rose Conway-Walsh TD
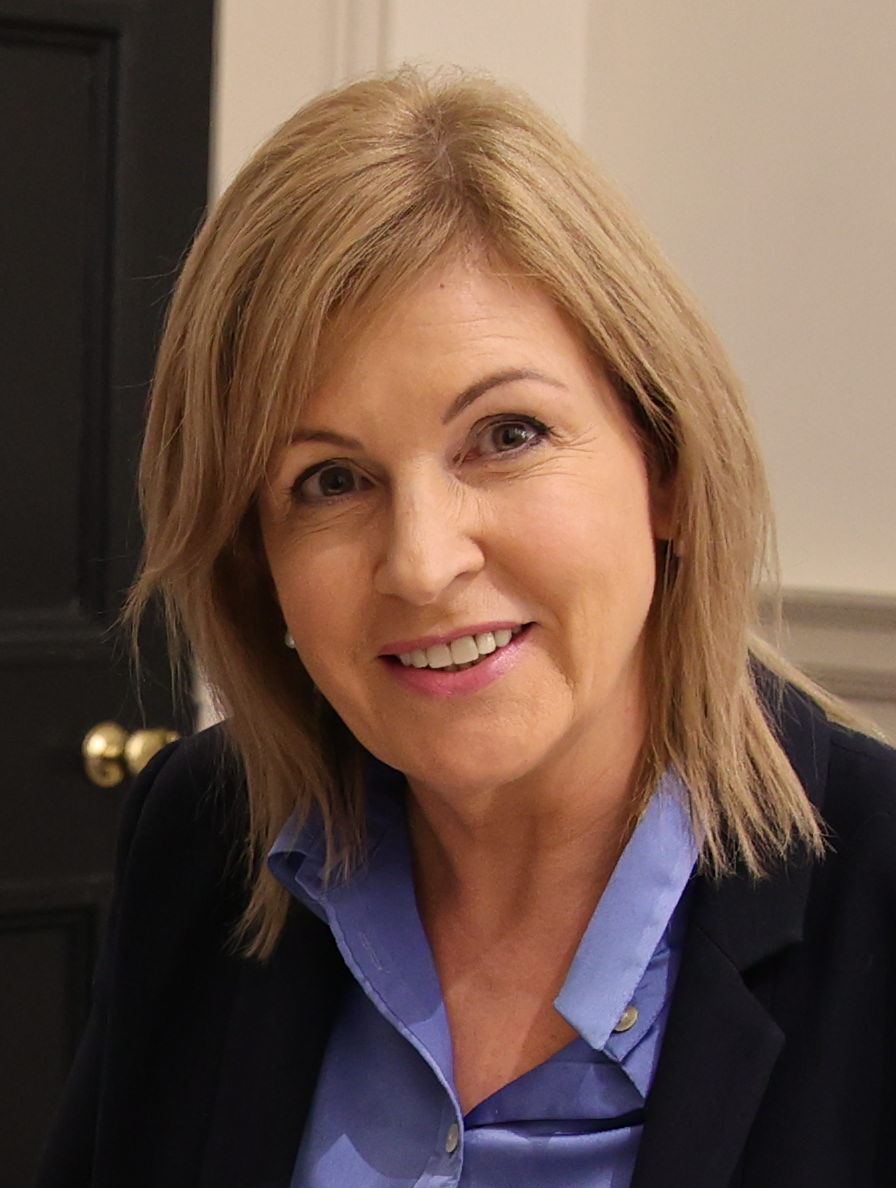
- Conway-Walsh in 2024

Teachta Dála
- Incumbent
- Assumed office February 2020
- Constituency: Mayo

Leader of Sinn Féin in the Seanad
- In office 8 June 2016 – 9 February 2020
- Leader: Gerry Adams; Mary Lou McDonald
- Preceded by: David Cullinane
- Succeeded by: Niall Ó Donnghaile

Senator
- In office 8 June 2016 – 8 February 2020
- Constituency: Agricultural Panel

Personal details
- Born: Rose Conway; 1969/1970 (age 56–57) Ballycroy, County Mayo, Ireland
- Party: Sinn Féin
- Spouse: Noel Walsh (m. 2000)
- Children: 2
- Education: NUI Galway
- Website: roseconwaywalsh.ie

Rose Conway-Walsh (née Conway; born 1969/1970) is an Irish Sinn Féin politician who has been a Teachta Dála (TD) for the Mayo constituency since the 2020 general election. She previously served as a Leader of Sinn Féin in the Seanad and a Senator for the Agricultural Panel from 2016 to 2020.

== Early life ==
Conway-Walsh grew up in Ballycroy, County Mayo and is one of nine children. She attended primary school in Ballycroy before attending Our Lady's Secondary School in Belmullet. She moved to London when she was 19. On returning to Ireland, she obtained a bachelor's degree in public management and a master's degree in local government from NUI Galway. Prior to entering politics, she worked in community development.

== Political career ==
Conway-Walsh has been a member of Sinn Féin's Ard Comhairle since 1990. She founded the Sinn Féin Mayo Women's Movement in response to the lack of women in politics.

At the 2009 Mayo County Council election, she was elected for the local electoral area of Belmullet, becoming the first female councillor ever elected in Belmullet. She was re-elected in 2014, topping the poll and being elected on the first count.

She was an unsuccessful candidate for the Mayo constituency at the 2011 and 2016 general elections, She was elected to the Seanad in 2016, topping the poll in the Agricultural Panel and was elected on the first count.

At the 2020 Irish general election, she was elected to the 33rd Dáil, the first Sinn Féin TD to be elected in Mayo since John Madden in June 1927. She was the party's spokesperson on Higher Education, Innovation, and Science. In July 2021 she attracted criticism for comparing segregated reopening after the COVID-19 pandemic to the segregation of the American South and the struggle of Rosa Parks, for which she later apologised.

At the 2024 general election, Conway-Walsh was re-elected to the Dáil. She was subsequently appointed Cathaoirleach of the Committee on Defence and National Security.

== Personal life ==
Conway married Noel Walsh in 2000. They live in Belmullet with their two sons.

Dáil	Election	Deputy (Party)	Deputy (Party)	Deputy (Party)	Deputy (Party)	Deputy (Party)
28th	1997	Beverley Flynn (FF)	Tom Moffatt (FF)	Enda Kenny (FG)	Michael Ring (FG)	Jim Higgins (FG)
29th	2002	Beverley Flynn (FF)	John Carty (FF)	Enda Kenny (FG)	Michael Ring (FG)	Jerry Cowley (Ind.)
30th	2007	Beverley Flynn (Ind.)	Dara Calleary (FF)	Enda Kenny (FG)	Michael Ring (FG)	John O'Mahony (FG)
31st	2011	Michelle Mulherin (FG)	Dara Calleary (FF)	Enda Kenny (FG)	Michael Ring (FG)	John O'Mahony (FG)
32nd	2016	Lisa Chambers (FF)	Dara Calleary (FF)	Enda Kenny (FG)	Michael Ring (FG)	4 seats 2016–2024
33rd	2020	Rose Conway-Walsh (SF)	Dara Calleary (FF)	Alan Dillon (FG)	Michael Ring (FG)	4 seats 2016–2024
34th	2024	Rose Conway-Walsh (SF)	Dara Calleary (FF)	Alan Dillon (FG)	Keira Keogh (FG)	Paul Lawless (Aon)
