= Ernie Caffrey =

Irish politician (1936–2026)

Senator
- In office 17 September 1997 – 12 September 2002
- Constituency: Industrial and Commercial Panel

Personal details
- Born: 1 October 1936 County Mayo, Ireland
- Died: 7 June 2026 (aged 89) County Mayo, Ireland
- Party: Fine Gael
- Spouse: Phyllis Caffrey
- Children: 4

Ernest Caffrey (1 October 1936 – 7 June 2026) was an Irish Fine Gael politician and publican. He was elected to Seanad Éireann on his third attempt, on the Industrial and Commercial Panel in 1997.

Caffrey was elected to Mayo County Council and Ballina Urban District Council at the 1999 local elections. He lost his seat at the 2002 Seanad election. He was also an unsuccessful candidate at the 1989, 1992, 1997 and 2002 general elections.

Caffrey died on 7 June 2026, at the age of 89.
