= Frank Chambers =

Irish politician (born 1949)

Senator
- In office 17 September 1997 – 12 September 2002
- Constituency: Nominated by the Taoiseach

Personal details
- Born: 3 March 1949 (age 77) County Mayo, Ireland
- Party: Fianna Fáil
- Children: 4

Frank Chambers (born 3 March 1949) is an Irish former Fianna Fáil politician from Newport, County Mayo.

== Personal life and family ==
He is married with four children, and is an auctioneer and farmer. His daughter Lisa was involved in establishing Renua in 2015; she is not to be confused with Fianna Fáil politician Lisa Chambers, who is not related to them.

== Political career ==
Chambers was a member of Mayo County Council from 1976. He was first elected in 1979 and stood down at the 2009 election.

At the 1997 election to Seanad Éireann he stood for election by the Cultural and Educational Panel, but was unsuccessful. After his defeat he was nominated by the Taoiseach, Bertie Ahern, to the 21st Seanad, but was not re-appointed in 2002. He stood in the Mayo constituency at the 2002 and 2007 general elections, but did not win a seat.
