= Mayo County Council =

Local authority for County Mayo, Ireland

Mayo County Council Comhairle Contae Mhaigh Eo

Type
- Type: County council of County Mayo

History
- Founded: 1 April 1899

Leadership
- Cathaoirleach: John Caulfield, FF

Structure
- Seats: 30
- Political groups: Fine Gael (11) Fianna Fáil (10) Aontú (1) Independent Ireland (1) Sinn Féin (1) Independent (6)

Elections
- Last election: 7 June 2024

Motto
- Irish: Dia is Muire Linn "God and Mary be with us"

Meeting place
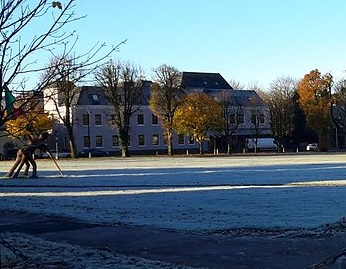
- County Hall, Castlebar

Website
- Official website

Mayo County Council (Irish: Comhairle Contae Mhaigh Eo) is the local authority of County Mayo, Ireland. As a county council, it is governed by the Local Government Act 2001. The council is responsible for housing and community, roads and transportation, urban planning and development, amenity and culture, and environment. The council has 30 elected members. Elections are held every five years and are by single transferable vote. The head of the council has the title of Cathaoirleach (chairperson). The county administration is headed by a chief executive, Kevin Kelly. The county town is Castlebar.

== History ==
Mayo County Council was established on 1 April 1899 under the Local Government (Ireland) Act 1898 for the administrative county of County Mayo, succeeding the judicial county of Mayo, except for the district electoral divisions of Ballaghaderreen and Edmondstown, which became part of County Roscommon; and with the addition of the district electoral divisions of Ballinchalla and Owenbrin, which had been part of County Galway; and the district electoral divisions of Ardnaree North, Ardnaree South Urban, and Ardnaree South Rural, which had been part of County Sligo.

Originally meetings of Mayo County Council took place in Castlebar Courthouse. The county council moved to modern facilities at County Hall further west on The Mall in Castlebar in 1989.

In the early 1930s, the County Council was dissolved for a time and replaced with a Commissioner because of the Mayo librarian controversy.

== Regional Assembly ==
Mayo County Council has two representatives on the Northern and Western Regional Assembly who are part of the West Strategic Planning Area Committee.

== Elections ==
The Local Government (Ireland) Act 1919 introduced the electoral system of proportional representation by means of the single transferable vote (PR-STV) for the 1920 Irish local elections. County Mayo was divided into 6 county electoral areas to elect the 24 members of the council. This electoral system has been retained, with the 30 members of Mayo County Council elected for a five-year term of office from multi-member local electoral areas (LEAs).

Year	FG	FF	SF	Aon	II	Lab	CnaP	CnaT	IFF	FP	CnaG	Rep	SF (pre-1922)	U	IrishNat	UIL	Ind.	Total
2024	10	10	1	1	1	0	—N/a	—N/a	0	—N/a	—N/a	—N/a	—N/a	0	—N/a	—N/a	7	30
2019	12	11	1	—N/a	—N/a	0	—N/a	—N/a	0	—N/a	—N/a	—N/a	—N/a	0	—N/a	—N/a	6	30
2014	10	10	3	—N/a	—N/a	0	—N/a	—N/a	0	—N/a	—N/a	—N/a	—N/a	0	—N/a	—N/a	7	30
2009	17	7	2	—N/a	—N/a	0	—N/a	—N/a	0	—N/a	—N/a	—N/a	—N/a	0	—N/a	—N/a	5	31
2004	15	12	1	—N/a	—N/a	1	—N/a	—N/a	0	—N/a	—N/a	—N/a	—N/a	0	—N/a	—N/a	2	31
1999	13	16	0	—N/a	—N/a	1	—N/a	—N/a	0	—N/a	—N/a	—N/a	—N/a	0	—N/a	—N/a	1	31
1991	13	15	0	—N/a	—N/a	1	—N/a	—N/a	0	—N/a	—N/a	—N/a	—N/a	0	—N/a	—N/a	2	31
1985	14	15	0	—N/a	—N/a	0	—N/a	—N/a	0	—N/a	—N/a	—N/a	—N/a	0	—N/a	—N/a	2	31
1979	16	15	0	—N/a	—N/a	0	—N/a	—N/a	0	—N/a	—N/a	—N/a	—N/a	0	—N/a	—N/a	0	31
1974	13	15	0	—N/a	—N/a	0	—N/a	—N/a	0	—N/a	—N/a	—N/a	—N/a	0	—N/a	—N/a	3	31
1967	13	16	0	—N/a	—N/a	0	—N/a	—N/a	0	—N/a	—N/a	—N/a	—N/a	0	—N/a	—N/a	2	31
1960	9	12	0	—N/a	—N/a	0	1	5	0	—N/a	—N/a	—N/a	—N/a	0	—N/a	—N/a	3	30
1955	8	13	0	—N/a	—N/a	0	1	7	0	—N/a	—N/a	—N/a	—N/a	0	—N/a	—N/a	2	31
1950	8	12	0	—N/a	—N/a	0	2	7	0	—N/a	—N/a	—N/a	—N/a	0	—N/a	—N/a	2	31
1945	4	16	0	—N/a	—N/a	0	—N/a	8	0	—N/a	—N/a	—N/a	—N/a	0	—N/a	—N/a	3 (Note: Includes 1 Independent Republican.)	31
1942	10	14	0	—N/a	—N/a	0	—N/a	0	1	3	—N/a	—N/a	—N/a	0	—N/a	—N/a	3 (Note: Includes 1 Independent Republican.)	31
1934	18	19	0	—N/a	—N/a	0	—N/a	—N/a	—N/a	0	—N/a	—N/a	—N/a	0	—N/a	—N/a	1	38
1928	—N/a	16	0	—N/a	—N/a	1	—N/a	—N/a	—N/a	0	17	—N/a	—N/a	0	—N/a	—N/a	4	38
1925	—N/a	—N/a	—N/a	—N/a	—N/a	0	—N/a	—N/a	—N/a	0	22	11	—N/a	0	—N/a	—N/a	5	38
1920	—N/a	—N/a	—N/a	—N/a	—N/a	0	—N/a	—N/a	—N/a	—N/a	—N/a	—N/a	24	0	0	—N/a	0	24
1914	—N/a	—N/a	—N/a	—N/a	—N/a	0	—N/a	—N/a	—N/a	—N/a	—N/a	—N/a				—N/a	0	24
1911	—N/a	—N/a	—N/a	—N/a	—N/a	0	—N/a	—N/a	—N/a	—N/a	—N/a	—N/a				—N/a	0	24
1908	—N/a	—N/a	—N/a	—N/a	—N/a	0	—N/a	—N/a	—N/a	—N/a	—N/a	—N/a				—N/a	0	24
1905	—N/a	—N/a	—N/a	—N/a	—N/a	0	—N/a	—N/a	—N/a	—N/a	—N/a	—N/a				—N/a	0	24
1902	—N/a	—N/a	—N/a	—N/a	—N/a	0	—N/a	—N/a	—N/a	—N/a	—N/a	—N/a	—N/a			—N/a	0	24
1899	—N/a	—N/a	—N/a	—N/a	—N/a	0	—N/a	—N/a	—N/a	—N/a	—N/a	—N/a	—N/a	1	4	19	0	24 (Note: 24 elected but note an additional 8 members were appointed by the rural district councils, 3 members nominated by the Grand Jury and 2 co-opted by the directly elected councillors giving a total of 37 councillors.)

== Local electoral areas and municipal districts ==
The area governed by the council

County Mayo is divided into LEAs and municipal districts, defined by electoral divisions.

Municipal District	LEA	Definition	Seats
Ballina		Ardagh, Ardnaree North, Ardnaree South Rural, Ardnaree South Urban, Attymass East, Attymass West, Ballina Rural, Ballina Urban, Ballycastle, Ballysakeery, Carrowmore, Crossmolina North, Crossmolina South, Deel, Derry, Fortland, Kilfian East, Kilfian South, Kilfian West, Kilgarvan, Killala, Lackan North, Lackan South, Mount Falcon, Rathoma, and Sallymount	6
Castlebar		Abhainn Bhrain, Addergoole, An Cheapaigh Dhuibh, Baile an Chalaidh, Baile Óbha, Balla, Ballinafad, Ballyhean, Ballynagoraher, Bellavary, Breaghwy, Burren, Burriscarra, Castlebar Rural (part), Castlebar Urban, Clogher (in the former Rural District of Castlebar), Cloonkeen, Croaghmoyle, Islandeady, Killavally, Letterbrick, Manulla, Partraí, Pontoon, Roslee, Strade, Tamhnaigh na Graí, and Turlough	7
Claremorris	Claremorris	Ballindine, Ballinrobe, Ballyhaunis, Ballyhowly, Bekan, Caraun, Claremorris, Cloghermore, Cong, Coonard, Course, Crossboyne, Culnacleha, Dalgan, Garrymore, Hollymount, Houndswood, Kilcolman, Kilcommon, Kilmaine, Kilvine, Knock North, Knock South, Mayo, Murneen, Neale, Newbrook, Shrule and Tagheen	6
Claremorris	Swinford	Aghamore, Ballinamore, Bohola, Brackloon, Callow, Cloonmore, Coolnaha, Cuildoo, Doocastle, Kilbeagh, Kilkelly, Killedan, Kilmovee, Kiltamagh, Loughanboy, Meelick, Sonnagh, Sraheen, Swineford, Toocananagh, Toomore, Tumgesh and Urlaur	4
Westport–Belmullet	Westport	Aghagower North, Aghagower South, Aillemore, Bundorragha, Clare Island, Clogher (in the former Rural District of Westport), Croaghpatrick, Derryloughan, Drummin, Emlagh, Erriff, Glenhest, Kilgeever, Kilmaclasser, Kilmeena, Kilsallagh, Knappagh, Louisburgh, Newport East, Owennadornaun, Slievemahanagh, Westport Rural and Westport Urban	4
Westport–Belmullet	Belmullet	Acaill, An Corrán, An Geata Mór Theas, An Geata Mór Thuaidh, Ballycroy North, Ballycroy South, Bangor, Barr Rúscaí, Béal an Mhuirthead, Béal Deirg Mór, Bunaveela, Cnoc an Daimh, Cnoc na Lobhar, Cnoc na Ráithe, Dumha Éige, Gleann Chaisil, Gleann na Muaidhe, Glenco, Guala Mhór, Moing na Bó, Na Monga, Newport West, Sheskin, Slievemore and Srahmore	3

== Councillors ==
The following were elected at the 2024 Mayo County Council election.

=== 2024 seats summary ===
Party	Seats
Fianna Fáil	10
Fine Gael	10
Aontú	1
Independent Ireland	1
Sinn Féin	1
Independent	7

=== Councillors by electoral area ===
This list reflects the order in which councillors were elected on 7 June 2024.

Council members from 2024 election
LEA	Name	Party
Ballina	John O'Hara	Fine Gael
Ballina	Mark Duffy (Note: Changed party, see table below for details.) (Note: Replaced during term, see table below for details.)	Independent
Ballina	Annie May Reape	Fianna Fáil
Ballina	Michael Loftus	Fianna Fáil
Ballina	Joe Faughan	Independent
Ballina	Jarlath Munnelly	Fine Gael
Belmullet	Paul McNamara	Fianna Fáil
Belmullet	Gerry Coyle	Fine Gael
Belmullet	Seán Carey	Fianna Fáil
Castlebar	Michael Kilcoyne	Independent
Castlebar	Ger Deere	Fine Gael
Castlebar	Blackie Gavin	Fianna Fáil
Castlebar	Al McDonnell	Fianna Fáil
Castlebar	Cyril Burke	Fine Gael
Castlebar	Donna Sheridan	Fine Gael
Castlebar	Harry Barrett	Independent
Claremorris	Patsy O'Brien	Independent
Claremorris	Richard Finn	Independent
Claremorris	Damien Ryan	Fianna Fáil
Claremorris	Alma Gallagher	Fine Gael
Claremorris	Michael Burke	Fine Gael
Claremorris	Paul Lawless	Aontú
Swinford	Gerry Murray	Sinn Féin
Swinford	Adrian Forkan	Fianna Fáil
Swinford	John Caulfield	Fianna Fáil
Swinford	Neil Cruise	Fine Gael
Westport	Chris Maxwell	Independent Ireland
Westport	Peter Flynn	Fine Gael
Westport	John O'Malley	Independent
Westport	Brendan Mulroy	Fianna Fáil

==== Co-options ====
Party	Outgoing	LEA	Reason	Date	Co-optee
Aontú	Paul Lawless	Claremorris	Elected to the 34th Dáil at the 2024 general election	2 January 2025	Deirdre Lawless
Fine Gael	Mark Duffy	Ballina	Elected to the 27th Seanad at the 2025 Seanad election	30 January 2025	Marie-Thérése Duffy

==== Changes in affiliation ====
Name	LEA	Elected as	New affiliation	Date
Mark Duffy	Ballina	Independent	Fine Gael	10 October 2024

== Assessment ==
Mayo County Council was identified in 2011 by An Taisce, the national trust, as among the worst county councils in Ireland's planning system during the 2000–2011 period.

County councils in Ireland were assessed by the organisation in relation to overzoning; decisions reversed by An Bord Pleanála after being passed by a local authority; percentage of vacant housing stock; and percentage of one-off houses permitted. An Taisce's report of its findings described the results as "stark and troubling".

In Mayo, many council planning decisions were overturned because the council violated its own County Development Plan. Overdevelopment in Mayo was another problem identified, with too many vacant houses in the county (not inclusive of holiday homes). A spokesman for An Taisce commented, "Mayo didn't do well on one-off houses either. What a lot of local authorities don't seem to appreciate is that it is more expensive to provide infrastructure to one-off houses in the countryside than it is to do so to estates."
